= List of Hudson River School artists =

The following is a list of the seventy-one painters in the Hudson River School, a mid-19th-century American art movement. The movement was led by a group of landscape painters whose aesthetic vision was influenced by romanticism. Some of these artists are also considered luminists, a related movement in mid-19th-century American painting that was characterized in the twentieth century. Their paintings depict the Hudson River Valley and the surrounding area, as well as the Catskill Mountains, Adirondack Mountains, and White Mountains of New Hampshire. Note that "school" in this sense refers to a group of people whose outlook, inspiration, output, or style demonstrates a common thread, rather than a learning institution.

== List ==
Artists are listed alphabetically by surname.

Artist name	Portrait	Famous work	Birth	Death	Description	Refs.
Charles Baker		More images	1838	1888	American landscape painter of the Hudson River School. He painted idyllic landscape paintings of an early American wilderness and the scenic vistas of the White Mountains in New Hampshire. He exhibited at the National Academy from 1839 to 1873 and at the American Art-Union in 1847. He was deeply influenced by the dramatic work of Thomas Cole and painted in a romantic style clearly tied to Cole's sublime aesthetic. He was one of the founders of the Art League of New York.	
William Bliss Baker		More images	27 November 1859	20 November 1886	American artist who began painting just as the Hudson River School was winding down. He studied at the National Academy of Design under Bierstadt and de Haas, and maintained studios in Clifton Park, New York, and New York City, where he painted in oils and watercolors. He completed more than 130 paintings, including several works in black and white. Baker died at age 26 at his father's house at Hoosick Falls, New York. The New York Times said that his death "deprived America of one of its most promising artists." Fallen Monarchs (left) is considered his masterpiece.	
John Dodgson Barrow		More images	24 November 1824	7 December 1906		
Susie M. Barstow		More images	9 May 1836	12 June 1923	Avid hiker and early member of the Appalachian Mountain Club, she is known for light-filled landscapes that exude serenity.	
Julie Hart Beers		More images	1835	13 August 1913	One of the few women of the Hudson River School to be commercially successful, she painted sweeping, well-balanced compositions with telling details.	
Albert Fitch Bellows		More images	20 November 1829	24 November 1883		
Albert Bierstadt		More images	7 January 1830	18 February 1902	German-American painter best known for his large, detailed landscapes of the American West. In obtaining the subject matter for these works, Bierstadt joined several journeys of the Westward Expansion. Though not the first artist to record these sites, Bierstadt was the foremost painter of these scenes for the remainder of the 19th century.	
DeWitt Clinton Boutelle		More images	6 April 1820	5 November 1884		
James Renwick Brevoort		More images	20 July 1832	15 December 1918		
Alfred Thompson Bricher		More images	10 April 1837	30 September 1908	American artist, one of the last painters in Hudson River School, known for his exploration of the effects of light and how it reflected, refracted, and absorbed on landscapes and seascapes.	
George Loring Brown		More images	2 February 1814	25 June 1889		
William Mason Brown		More images	1828	6 September 1898		
Johann Hermann Carmiencke		More images	1810	15 June 1867		
John William Casilear		More images	25 June 1811	17 August 1893	Engraver who was encouraged to take up painting by Asher Durand	
Thomas Chambers		More images	1808	1869		
Charles Henry Chapin		More images	1830	1889		
Frederic Edwin Church		More images	4 May 1826	7 April 1900	Student of Thomas Cole, he became a central figure in the Hudson River School of American landscape painters. Church is perhaps best known for painting large panoramic landscapes, often depicting dramatic natural phenomena, with emphasis on light and a romantic respect for natural detail. In his later years, Church painted classical European and Middle Eastern cityscapes. He created many of his works at Olana.	
Thomas Cole		More images	1 February 1801	11 February 1848	Commonly acknowledged as the founder of the Hudson River School, he painted scenes near his home in Catskill, New York	
Samuel Colman		More images	4 March 1832	26 March 1920	National academician whose landscapes show the influence of the Hudson River School, he is believed to have studied under Asher Durand.	
Jasper Francis Cropsey		More images	18 February 1823	23 April 1900	First-generation member of the Hudson River School, he painted autumn landscapes that startled viewers with their boldness and brilliance. As an artist, he believed landscapes were the highest art form and that nature was a direct manifestation of God. Cropsey was a founding member of the American Watercolor Society, and was one of few Hudson River School artists to paint in that medium.	
William Moore Davis		More images	22 May 1829	26 March 1920		
Lockwood de Forest		More images	8 June 1850	3 April 1932		
Victor DeGrailly		More images	25 October 1804	4 September 1887	French painter	
Thomas Doughty		More images	19 July 1793	22 July 1856	First American artist to work exclusively as a landscapist and was successful both for his skill and the fact that Americans were turning their interest to landscape.	
Robert S. Duncanson		More images	1821	21 December 1872	African American artist painting before and during the Civil War whose landscapes were influenced by the Hudson River School	
Asher Brown Durand		More images	21 August 1796	17 September 1886	Engraver who took up landscape painting, he is particularly remembered for his detailed portrayals of trees, rocks, and foliage, especially with his masterpiece, Kindred Spirits. He also mentored and encouraged many other more junior artists.	
Samuel P. Dyke		More images	1835	1870		
Alvan Fisher		More images	9 August 1792	13 February 1863		
Hermann Fuechsel		More images	8 August 1833	30 September 1915		
William Charles Anthony Frerichs		More images	2 March 1829	16 March 1905		
Charles Henry Gifford	Charles Henry Gifford	More images	13 July 1839	20 January 1904		
Sanford Robinson Gifford	Sanford R. Gifford	More images	10 July 1823	29 August 1880	One of the leading members of the Hudson River School. Gifford's landscapes are known for their emphasis on light and soft atmospheric effects, and he is regarded as a practitioner of Luminism, an offshoot style of the Hudson River School.	
Régis François Gignoux		More images	1816	1882		
Eliza Pratt Greatorex		More images	25 December 1819	9 February 1897		
Daniel Charles Grose		More images	21 March 1832	24 February 1900	English army officer who emigrated to the United States around 1867. He sketched and painted pastoral landscapes throughout the northeast, especially in Maine, Connecticut, and the Hudson River Valley.	
James McDougal Hart		More images	10 May 1828	24 October 1901	Scottish-born American landscape and cattle painter of the Hudson River School. His older brother, William Hart, was also a Hudson River School artist, and the two painted similar subjects. Sister Julie Hart Beers (Kempson) was also a landscape artist of this school.	
William Hart		More images	31 March 1823	17 June 1894	Scottish-born American landscape and cattle painter, and Hudson River School artist. His younger brother, James McDougal Hart, was also a Hudson River School artist, and the two painted similar subjects. He studied under Jules-Joseph Lefebvre.	
William Stanley Haseltine		More images	11 June 1835	3 February 1900	American painter and draftsman who was associated with the Hudson River School and Luminism. By 1859 he was installed in the Tenth Street Studio Building in New York City, then a central point for American landscape painters; also in the building were Frederic Edwin Church, Albert Bierstadt, and Worthington Whittredge, the latter two having befriended Haseltine in Europe.	
Robert Havell, Jr.		More images	25 November 1793	11 November 1878		
Martin Johnson Heade		More images	11 August 1819	4 September 1904	Prolific artist who painted many different subjects including landscapes. There are mixed views as to whether Heade is part of the Hudson River School or was only partially influenced by it. Regardless, he was friends with many of the more prominent members, including Church.	
Hermann Ottomar Herzog		More images	15 November 1831	6 February 1932	German landscape painter who moved to Pennsylvania and painted subjects across the United States. He is considered a part of the Hudson River School, but typically painted a more realistic and less dramatic scene than Bierstadt or Church.	
Thomas Hill		More images	11 September 1829	30 June 1908	English born painter, he moved to the United States at age 15. He produced many fine paintings of the California landscape, in particular of the Yosemite Valley, as well as the White Mountains of New Hampshire.	
Ransome G. Holdridge		More images	1836	1899		
George Inness		More images	1 May 1825	3 August 1894		
David Johnson		More images	10 May 1827	30 January 1908	Johnson was born in New York City and studied for two years at the antique school of the National Academy of Design. He also studied briefly with Jasper Francis Cropsey. Along with John Frederick Kensett and John William Casilear, he was best known for the development of Luminism.	
John Frederick Kensett		More images	22 March 1816	14 December 1872	Kensett is best known for his landscapes of upstate New York and New England and seascapes of coastal New Jersey, Long Island and New England.	
Charles Wilson Knapp		More images	17 March 1823	15 May 1900		
Edmund Darch Lewis		More images	17 October 1835	12 August 1910		
Homer Dodge Martin		More images	28 October 1836	12 February 1897		
George Herbert McCord		More images	1 August 1848	6 April 1909		
Jervis McEntee	Jervis McEntee	More images	14 July 1828	27 January 1891	American painter of the Hudson River School. He is a somewhat lesser-known figure of the 19th-century American art world, but was the close friend and traveling companion of several of the important Hudson River School artists.	
Mary Blood Mellen		More images	1819	1886	Mellen studied under Fitz Henry Lane and developed a luminist style for her landscapes and maritime subjects.	
Louis Rémy Mignot		More images	3 February 1831	22 September 1870		
Charles Herbert Moore		More images	10 April 1840	15 February 1930	Considered a minor member of the Hudson River School, Moore later began painting in the Pre-Raphaelite style. He later became the first art professor at Harvard University, and the first director of the university's Fogg Art Museum. Moore was one of few watercolor painters in the Hudson River School, and was an early member of the American Watercolor Society.	
Thomas Moran		More images	12 February 1837	25 August 1926	Artist of the Hudson River School. Thomas Moran's vision of the Western landscape was critical to the creation of Yellowstone National Park. His pencil and watercolor field sketches and paintings captured the grandeur and documented the extraordinary terrain and natural features of the Yellowstone region.	
William Sidney Mount		More images	26 November 1807	19 November 1868		
Arthur Parton		More images	26 March 1842	7 March 1914	Parton's paintings were also influenced by the Barbizon School.	
Harriet Cany Peale		More images	1799	12 January 1869		
William Trost Richards		More images	14 November 1833	8 November 1905		
Ferdinand Richardt		More images	10 April 1819	29 October 1895		
Thomas Prichard Rossiter		More images	20 September 1818	17 May 1871		
Francis Augustus Silva		More images	4 October 1835	31 March 1886		
William Louis Sonntag		More images	1822	1900		
James Augustus Suydam		More images	27 March 1819	25 September 1865		
Jesse Talbot		More images	1 April 1805	29 January 1879	Associate member of the National Academy of Design and a friend of the poet Walt Whitman. Talbot worked for the American Tract Society and other evangelical Christian organizations in New York City before becoming a professional artist, first exhibiting in the National Academy in 1838. His work was often favorably compared to that of Thomas Cole. The notebook in which Whitman first wrote down the ideas for Leaves of Grass is known as the “Talbot Wilson notebook” because Talbot's name and address (Wilson Street in Brooklyn, New York) are written on the inside front cover.	
William Guy Wall		More images	1792	1864		
Mary Josephine Walters		More images	1837	1883		
Paul Weber		More images	19 January 1823	12 October 1916		
Robert Walter Weir		More images	18 June 1803	1 May 1889	Elected to the National Academy of Design in 1829, Robert Weir was an American artist associated with the Hudson River School. He was an instructor at the United States Military Academy for forty-two years, 1832–1874.	
Worthington Whittredge		More images	22 May 1820	25 February 1910	American artist of the Hudson River School. He was a highly regarded artist of his time, and was friends with several leading Hudson River School artists including Albert Bierstadt and Sanford Robinson Gifford. He traveled widely and excelled at landscape painting, many examples of which are now in major museums. He served as president of the National Academy of Design from 1874 to 1875.	
John Williamson		More images	1826	28 May 1885	Scottish-American painter	
