= Paul Dougherty (artist) =

American painter (1877–1947)

- Paul Dougherty, 1931
- Born: September 6, 1877; Brooklyn, New York
- Died: January 9, 1947 (aged 69); Palm Springs, CA, United States
- Education: Henry Ward Ranger, William S. Barnett, Independent study in Europe
- Known for: Marine Paintings, Landscapes
- Movement: California Plein-Air Painting, American Impressionism

Paul Hampden Dougherty (September 6, 1877 – January 9, 1947) was an American marine painter. Dougherty (pronounced dog-er-tee) was recognized for his American Impressionism paintings of the coasts of Maine and Cornwall in the years after the turn of the 20th century. His work has been described as bold and masculine, and he was best known for his many paintings of breakers crashing against rocky coasts and mountain landscapes. Dougherty also painted still lifes, created prints and sculpted.

The son of a prominent attorney, Dougherty graduated from law school and passed the bar, but chose art over the law. His artistic training was relatively brief. An erudite man and a world traveler, Dougherty sketched and exhibited extensively on both the east and west coasts of the United States, in the British Isles, throughout Europe and in Asia. He spent the first half of his career based in the east, but he moved west in 1928 and eventually spent the summers in Carmel, California and the cooler winter months in the desert. Dougherty won almost every major award at the annual exhibitions of the National Academy of Design in New York, as well as a Gold Medal at the Panama–Pacific International Exposition in San Francisco. By 1915 many American museums had purchased his works for their permanent collections. He was elected to membership of the National Academy of Design.

== Early life ==
Paul Dougherty was born in Brooklyn, New York. He was the eldest of six children born to J. Hampden Dougherty, a prominent attorney, legal scholar and leader of the New York State Bar Association. While his father wanted to see him pursue a career in law, Dougherty was always drawn to art, and sketched and painted incessantly. He graduated from Brooklyn Polytechnic Institute in 1896 where he received some training in art. His talent in art was always apparent and by the time he was eighteen one of his works was accepted for the Annual Exhibition of the National Academy of Design. In spite of his artistic abilities, he diligently followed through on his education and graduated from New York Law School and passed the bar, but he was never to practice law. Information on his artistic training can be contradictory and sketchy. In filling out an information card for the National Academy, he stated that he studied with the noted landscape painter Henry Ward Ranger in 1897, which is the only formal training he mentioned. But there are accounts that he studied with the innovative ship designer and marine painter William S. Barnett (1854–1927) from Rockport, Maine, who had been living in Brooklyn since 1885 when he returned from his studies at the Académie Julian. Dougherty did share a studio in Brooklyn early in his career with Barnett as well as Gustave Wiegland (1870–1957), George McCord and Harry Roseland. About 1901 these artists were joined by Frederick and Joseph Boston, Charles Burlingame, Edward Rorke, and Benjamin Eggleston in forming The Brooklyn Ten which then became known as The Society of Brooklyn Painters. The first annual exhibition of the society was held at the Hooper Gallery on Fulton Street in Brooklyn in 1903.

== European travel and early career ==
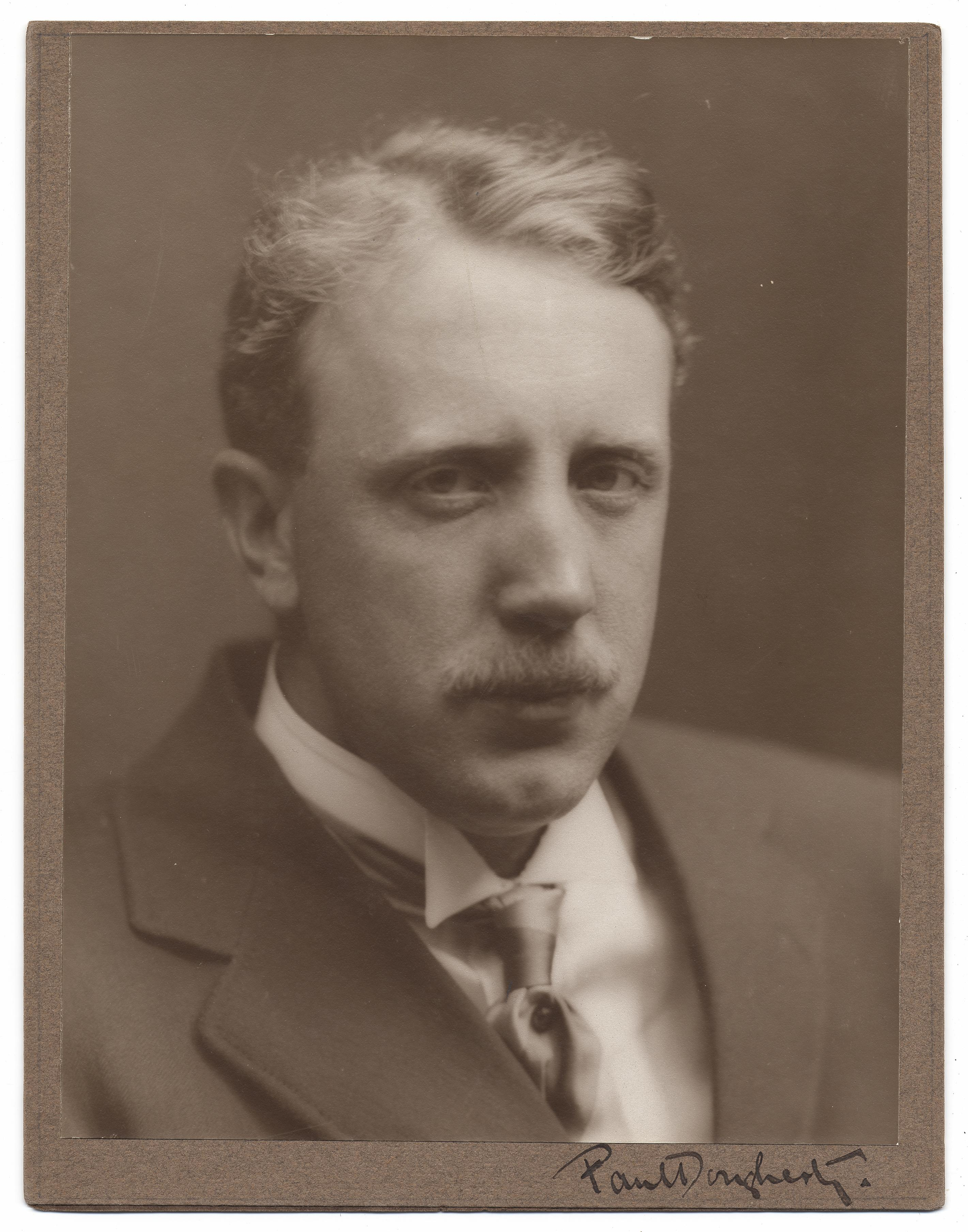
Paul Dougherty, c. 1920

To advance his studies, Dougherty and his younger brother, the stage actor Walter Hampden Dougherty (1879–1955), left on an extended trip to Europe. On this sojurn, he sketched and painted throughout the continent and studied the Old Masters in museums to educate himself. Munich, Venice, Paris and Florence were all stops on the Dougherty brother's European tour. In 1901 Dougherty sent a landscape painting home for the annual exhibit of the National Academy of Design and he showed his landscapes with the Academy for the next several years. In Paris he met a young Swedish music student named Antje Berthe Lund and they were married in 1902. The Doughertys returned to America and the artist opened a home and studio in Nutley, New Jersey, where their daughter Lisa was born. Tragically, Antje Dougherty died of appendicitis just weeks later. Soon after returning to the United States, Dougherty began to work on Monhegan Island, Maine, an area which was already a famous summer place for painters. In Maine, the young painter began to build his first significant body of the marine paintings he would become known for and the dramatic views of the Island offered him a host of subjects. He joined the Society of American Artists in 1904, a group of younger painters who had broken away from the National Academy years before because it was then dominated by the aging members of the Hudson River School. When the Society merged with the National Academy in 1905, Dougherty automatically became an Associate Member. In 1907 he had his first exhibition at the William Macbeth's Macbeth Gallery in New York City. Irish born William Macbeth (1851–1917) was the first dealer to only represent American artists and he opened his first gallery in 1892. Macbeth and Dougherty forged a lasting friendship and the young painter began a long series of successful exhibitions in the 5th Avenue Gallery.

Evening Calm, Paul Dougherty, Oil on Canvas, 26" x 36" (c. 1910) Exhibited Carnegie Art Institute, Private Collection

=== St. Ives ===
The famous art colony of St. Ives lies on the Cornish Peninsula in Southwestern England and Dougherty worked there extensively. While J. M. W. Turner (1775–1851) did a pencil sketch of St. Ives as early as 1811, it wasn't until the completion of a rail line to Penzance in 1859, that artists began to frequent the area and paint its dramatic views. After the mining industry collapsed, more artists began to visit including James Whistler and his students, who painted there in 1884. By 1886, there was a colony of painters in St. Ives, led by the American Edward Simmons and the Victorian marine painter Adrian Stokes (1854–1935). Simmons influenced the Swedish painter Anders Zorn who learned to work in oil in St. Ives. The British painter Julius Olsson was one of the most influential artists in St. Ives in the years after the turn of the 20th century and he brought many other painters to the area. Paul Dougherty came to love St. Ives and some of his most dramatic works were done of the dramatic cliffs there. Dougherty spent about six months a year there from 1908 to 1913. For many years, Dougherty lived a bi-continental existence, splitting his time between his New York studio and Europe. In the spring and summer he went on lengthy sketching trips abroad, coming back to New York for the fall and winter exhibitions. In May 1915 for example he applied for a new passport, stating that his travels would take him to England, France, Italy, Switzerland and Spain. In 1921 for yet another passport he stated he would travel to Belgium, the Netherlands, Italy, Sweden, Denmark, Norway and Spain.

== Mid-career ==
As Dougherty reached middle age, he kept up his exhibitions and travels. He spent the late spring and summer of each year abroad, usually arriving home in October or November. His New York studio changes locations almost annually. In the 1920s he exhibited his watercolors more frequently and in 1920 and 1921 alone his work in this medium was exhibited at the Cleveland Museum of Art, the Memorial Art Gallery in Rochester New York, the Brooklyn Museum and the Art Institute of Chicago. While his friend and dealer William Macbeth (1851–1917) had died in 1917, Dougherty's long relationship with Macbeth Galleries continued through his rotund son, Robert Wilson Macbeth who took over the gallery upon his father's death. Even though the modern movements were becoming more popular, especially in New York City, landscape and marine paintings still remained popular and had a dedicated constituency. Another major feature on Dougherty appeared in the pages of the International Studio, the most famous English language art publication in 1921 and again, the writer, Ameen Rihani, compared the painter to Winslow Homer: "there is no doubt that the mantle of Winslow Homer has fallen on Paul Dougherty. Does it fit? Does it trail? Does it inspire respect? I can answer the last question in the affirmative."

=== Artistic recognition ===
As he reached the heart of his career, Dougherty became more interested in light and experimented with "broken color" techniques and "optical blending." In 1913, in the museum journal Aesthetics, he was said to be "now pre-eminently a painter of light, as much an exponent of it as Claude Monet." Dougherty had a solo exhibition at the Art Institute of Chicago in the summer of 1914. In an attempt to become known for landscapes as well as marines paintings he was represented by a number of his pictures of the Swiss Alps including "Evening Calm." In the bulletin of the Art Institute the editor said that "Mr. Dougherty is now chiefly thought of as a painter of accomplished marines; but his mountain pictures, though less well known are no less important." In 1915 the Panama–Pacific International Exposition was held in San Francisco to celebrate the city's rebirth after the San Francisco earthquake and fire. The San Francisco world's fair featured a massive exhibition of paintings from the history of art as well as hundreds of works by contemporary artists from the United States and Europe. This exhibition is considered a turning point in California Art and it was also a triumph for Paul Dougherty who had four works exhibited and was awarded a Gold Medal. In his guide to the exhibition, the writer Michael Williams stated that "Another marine artist whose work is well and favorably known and which has been awarded a Gold Medal, is Paul Dougherty. Four pictures by him hang on Wall A. Paul Dougherty is a New York man, of such independence of mind that he studied without any masters in Paris, London, Florence, Venice and Munich. Examples of his work hang in all the principal galleries of the country." Dougherty was in such demand that a 1916 issue of the Bulletin for the Detroit Museum of Art mentioned him among the American artists who had "reached the zenith of their power" whose works they were seeking for their permanent collection. That December, his watercolors were the subject of an exhibition at Macbeth Gallery and in a review, the writer for the New York Times complimented Dougherty's progress by saying that "in his oil pictures has worked during the last ten years with a steadily increasing appreciation of chromatic values, is showing at the Macbeth Galleries a group of water colors that challenge comparison with the best of their kind."

== Move to California ==
By the 1920s Dougherty was beginning to suffer the debilitating effects of arthritis. Although he did not move to California for a number of years, he was painting on the Monterey Peninsula by 1925 because he entered "Evening at Monterey" in the large exhibition of American watercolors that Macbeth Gallery opened in December of that year. Searching for a better climate to ease its effects, he and his last wife, the socialite Paula Gates, moved west, first to the dry desert climate of Tucson, Arizona. Still wanting to be near the sea, In 1931 the Doughertys found a home in the art colony of Carmel, California, a picturesque spot on the rugged central coast of California, south of San Francisco.

He joined the Carmel Art Association and became active in the local art scene. He became a member of the CAA board of directors for ten years and served as president for one term. There, he sketched Carmel Bay and the coastal inlets from vantage points on the cliffs. For a number of years, Dougherty spent the cooler months in the desert and the rest of the year in Carmel where he still painted prolifically. Despite his ailments, he and his wife Paula still traveled abroad, going to Europe in 1934 and 1937. Still By the 1940s, the effects of old age began to creep up on him and he was unable to work for the last four years of his life. Finally, he was struck with cancer and died in Palm Springs, California where he was wintering, at the age of sixty-nine. Dougherty's Palm Springs home, designed by the architect John Porter Clark, was designated a Class One Historic Site by the City of Palm Springs in 2014.

== Assessment and oeuvre ==
Paul Dougherty was a prolific and successful painter. He forged a national artistic reputation early in his life and his works sold steadily until the modern movements eventually supplanted traditional art in the 1930s. In 1978 the art historian Mahonri Sharp Young wrote of him that "Everything came to him; all his pictures sold, he won all the prizes...the rich delighted to honor him, and his wives were glamorous." While he is primarily recognized for his coastal scenes, he also painted landscapes, mountain scenes and even the arid desert. His best known paintings were rugged coastal scenes of Maine, Cornwall, Brittany and the Monterey peninsula in California. His artistic production is well divided between scenes of the Maine Coast, the Cornish Coast of England, pictures from his extensive travels in Europe, Asia and the Caribbean, a bold series of Alpine paintings and hundreds of paintings done in Carmel, where he had his last studio. Most of these works were in oil, with many smaller works on board and larger works on canvas, but he also worked extensively in watercolor. In her summary of Dougherty's work for the National Arts Club's collection, art historian Carol Lowrey wrote that "The drama and realism of Dougherty's marines also prompted comparisons to Winslow Homer and indeed, the master's later seascapes served as an aesthetic and thematic model for Dougherty and a number of artists of his generation, such as Frederick Waugh. Like Homer, Dougherty liked to depict churning, turbulent waters, exemplified in canvasses such as Grey Sea, a work that demonstrates his favorite compositional scheme – an outcropping of rocks pounded by the rough surf in the foreground, a high horizon line, and an expansive of cloud streaked sky. As in the majority of his coastal scenes, Dougherty avoids allusions to man, architecture or boats, preferring to concentrate on the tumultuous motion of the sea and the glimmer of light on the wave crests and the rocky shore – denoted here by means of an energetic brushwork and a palette of blues, mauves, greens and browns with a pale yellow, gray and white. While his approach is grounded in the Realist tradition, Dougherty's painterly touch and iridescent hues indicate a debt to Impressionism as well."

=== Galleries ===
Paul Dougherty's works were exhibited in a number of leading commercial galleries in his lifetime, but then primarily on the east coast of the United States. New York's Macbeth Gallery was always his primary dealer. Today his work is primarily sold by galleries in California, where he spent the last fifteen years of his life.

== See also ==
- California Plein-Air Painting
- American Impressionism
- French Impressionism
- National Academy of Design
- California Art Club

== Memberships and affiliations ==
- National Academy of Design, New York City
- National Institute of Arts and Letters, New York City
- National Arts Club, New York City
- Society of American Artists, New York
- American Watercolor Society, New York
- Bohemian Club, San Francisco, California
- Lotos Club, New York City
- Salmugundi Club, New York City

== Awards and honors ==
- Gold Medal, Panama–Pacific International Exposition (1915)
- Altman Prize, National Academy of Design, 93rd Annual Exhibition (1918) (Won with "Bottalac Cove")
- Inness Gold Medal, National Academy of Design (1913)
- Carnegie Prize, National Academy of Design (1915)
- Palmer Memorial Prize, National Academy of Design (1941)
- Silver Medal, 18th Annual Carnegie International Exhibition (1914)

== Studio locations ==
- Sebasco, Maine,
- Carmel-by-the-Sea, California
- Paris, France
- St. Ives, Cornwall, England
- New York City
- Tucson, Arizona

== Public collections with works by Paul Dougherty ==
- Metropolitan Museum of Art, New York City ("October Seas" purchased by the museum in 1911)
- Art Institute of Chicago, Chicago Illinois ("Blue Gale" was a museum purchase in 1910)
- Monterey Museum of Art, Monterey,
- Allen Memorial Art Museum, Oberlin, College
- Addison Museum of American Art, Andover, Massachusetts
- Corcoran Museum of Art, Washington, D.C.
- Hunter Museum of American Art, Chattanooga, Tennessee
- Munson-Williams-Proctor Art Institute, Utica, New York
- National Gallery of Art, Washington, D.C.
- Birmingham Museum of Art, Birmingham, Alabama
- Albright-Knox Museum of Art, Buffalo, New York
- Ball State Museum of Art, Muncie, Indiana
- Arizona State Museum of Art, Tempe, Arizona
- Museum of Modern Art, New York City
- Lyman Allyn Museum, New London, Connecticut
- Museum of Fine Arts, Boston, Massachusetts
- Oakland Museum of California, Oakland, California
- Museum of Art at Brigham Young University, Provo, Utah
- The Irvine Museum, Irvine, California
- Georgia Museum of Art, Athens, Georgia
- The Carnegie Institute, Pittsburgh, Pennsylvania
- Hackley Museum of Art, Muskegon, Michigan ("A Golden Light" was a museum purchase in 1913 soon after the museum was founded)
- National Museum of American Art, Washington D.C.
- National Gallery of Art, Canada, Ottawa, Canada
- St. Louis Museum of Fine Arts, St. Louis, Missouri ("After the Gale" was purchased in 1916)
- Toledo Museum of Art, Toledo, Ohio
- Memorial Art Gallery, Rochester, New York ("Coast of Cornwall" presented by George Eastman of Eastman-Kodak)
- Brooklyn Museum, New York City
- Gibbes Museum of Art, Charleston, South Carolina
- Jack S. Blanton Museum of Art, Austin, Texas
- Colby College Museum of Art, Waterville, Maine
- High Museum of Art, Atlanta, Georgia
- Heckscher Museum of Art, Huntington, Long Island, New York
- The Joslyn Art Museum, Omaha, Nebraska
- Wright Museum of Art, Beloit, Wisconsin
- The Washington County Museum of Fine Arts, Hagerstown, Maryland
- Montclair Art Gallery, Montclair, New Jersey
- Norton Museum of Art, West Palm Beach, Florida,
- Springville Museum of Art, Springville, Utah
- Whitney Museum of American Art, New York City
- The Phillips Collection, Washington, D.C. ("Storm Voices" was one of Duncan Phillip's first purchases, the Phillips also has "Round the Bay")
- The Columbus Museum of Art, Columbus, Ohio
- Mabee-Gerrer Museum of Art, Shawnee, Oklahoma
- The Newark Museum, Newark, New Jersey
- The Arkell Museum at Canajoharie, Canajoharie, New York
- Telfair Museum of Art, Savannah, Georgia
- Portland Art Museum, Portland, Oregon
- The Parish Art Museum, Southampton, New York
- The Hickory Museum of Art, Hickory, North Carolina (A "Freshening Gale" and "No Man's Bay" were a museum purchase and "California Sunset" was a gift from the artist's daughter Lisa Dougherty Coons in 1988)
