= Charles Chapin (disambiguation) =

Charles Chapin (1858–1930) was an American newspaper editor and convicted murderer.

Charles Chapin may also refer to:

- Charles Chapin (U.S. Marshal) (1803–1878), American physician, public official and politician
- Charles Henry Chapin (1830–1889), American painter
- Charles S. Chapin (1859–1924), American educator
- Charles V. Chapin (1856–1941), American public health worker

== See also ==
- Charles Chaplin
