= Victor DeGrailly =

French painter

- Born: 25 October 1804; Paris, France
- Died: 4 September 1887 (aged 82); Paris, France
- Occupation: Landscape painter

Victor DeGrailly (25 October 1804 – 4 September 1887) was a French landscape painter. He is considered a member of the Hudson River School of painters.

== Biography ==
DeGrailly was born on 25 October 1804 in Paris, France. His teacher was Jean-Victor Bertin. DeGrailly exhibited at the Salon from 1830 to 1880. He painted landscapes in the style of, or directly copied, 17th-century Dutch painters such as Jacob van Ruisdael and Meindert Hobbema.

DeGrailly's paintings of U.S. landscapes are believed to be copies of engravings, that were in turn based on William Henry Bartlett's drawings. It is not believed that DeGrailly had ever been to the United States himself. DeGrailly died on 4 September 1887 in Paris.

In 1975, the only monographic exhibition of DeGrailly's paintings took place at the Washburn Gallery in New York City.
