= Paul Weber (artist) =

German painter (1823–1916)

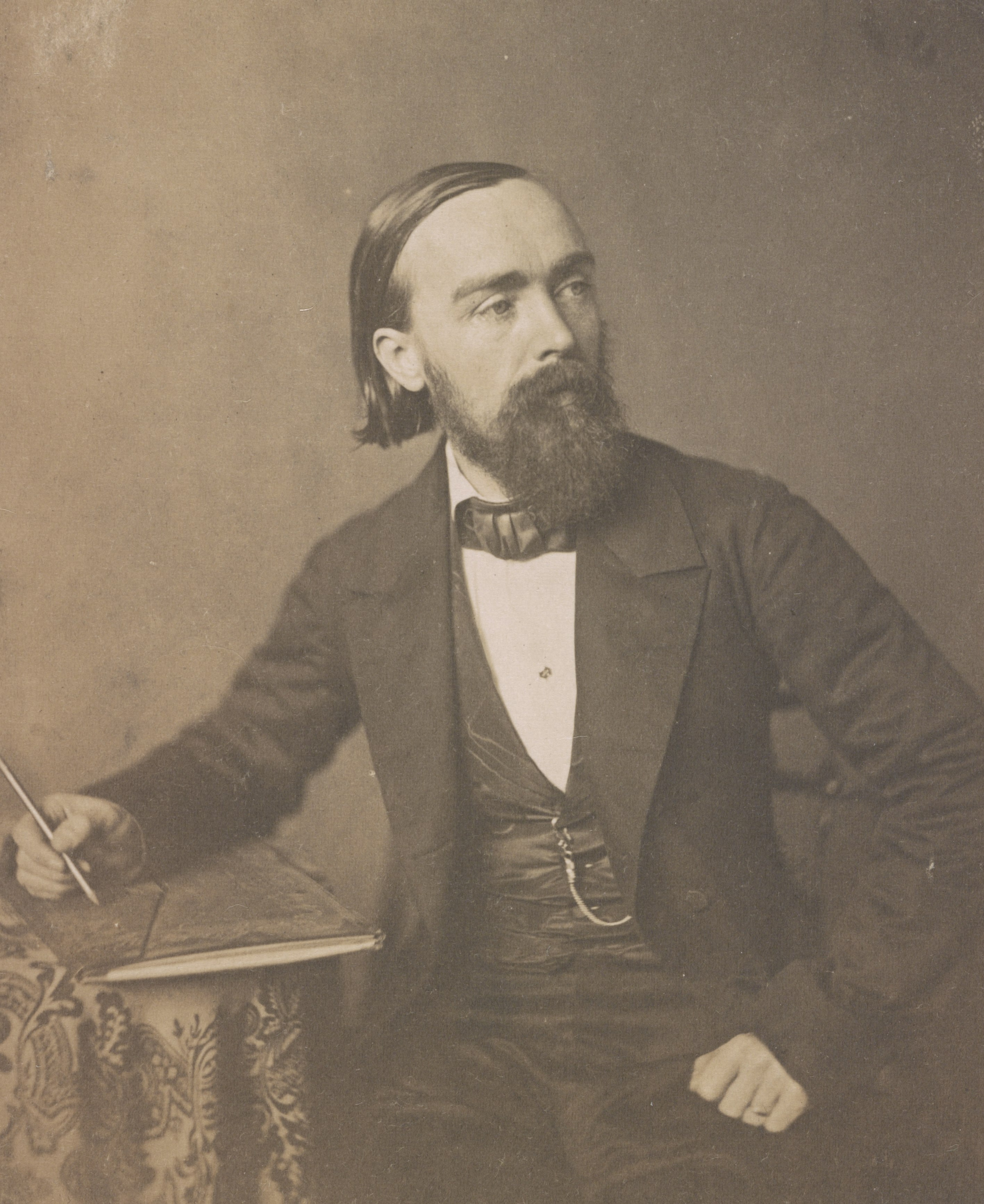
- Born: 19 January 1823; Darmstadt
- Died: 12 October 1916 (aged 93); Munich

Gottlieb Daniel Paul Weber (19 January 1823 – 12 October 1916) was a German artist. Weber is known for his ethereal and timeless landscape paintings of early northeast America. He emigrated to the U.S. in 1848 and though he returned to Germany around 1860 his influence on American landscape painting was still felt for years.

== Early life ==
Weber was born in Darmstadt, Germany the son of the composer Johann Daniel Weber (1784–1848). He studied art at the Städelschen Kunstinstitut in Frankfurt before, two years later, moving to Munich to study at the Academy in Munich which became his home base except when he lived in America. Trained at the Akademie der Bildenden Künste, Weber specialized in Alpine landscape painting.

== Career ==
In 1848, soon after the collapse of the German Republic, at the age of 25, he moved to the United States, settling in Philadelphia, where he was a frequent exhibitor at the Pennsylvania Academy of the Fine Arts from 1849 onward. He also exhibited at the National Academy of Design and the Boston Athaeneum.

Already an accomplished landscape painter by the time he was thirty years old, Weber refashioned himself as a teacher. Among his students in the class of landscape painting were William Trost Richards, William Stanley Haseltine, Edward Moran, and Harriet Cany Peale.

In 1860 he returned to Germany settling back in Munich where he would spend the rest of his life. Weber kept on painting American landscape scenes for European audiences relying on memory and artistic reconstruction. Even after his return, Weber still showed his paintings in America including at the Centennial Exposition in Philadelphia in 1876.

== Personal life ==
In 1850 his son Carl Weber was born in Philadelphia, who followed in his father's footsteps to become an artist and went on to paint landscapes like his father. Paul had a nephew named Carl Philipp Weber who also became a painter.

== Selection of works ==
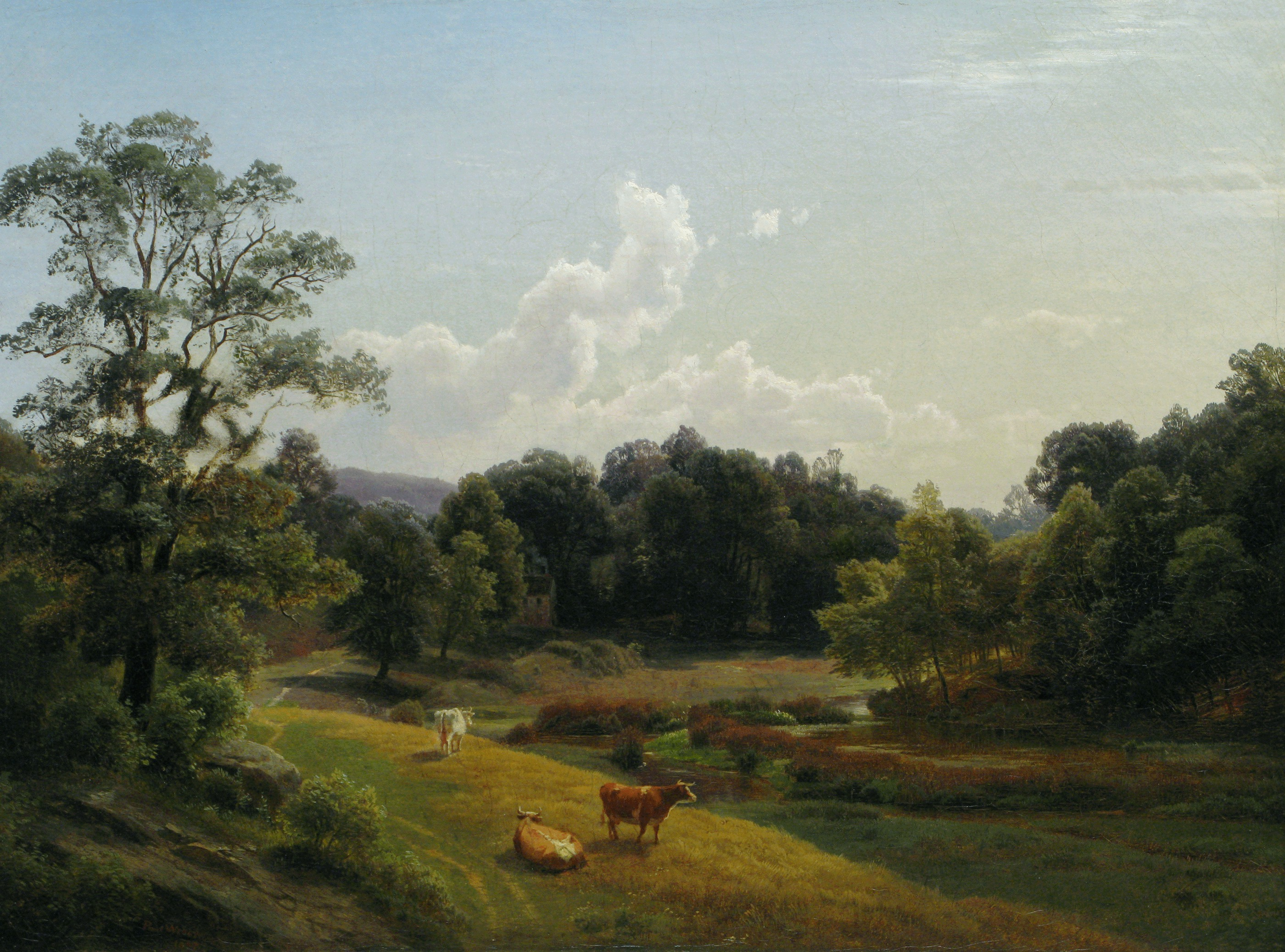
Pastoral Landscape in Summer, 1857

- Wooded Landscape with Lake and Mountains, 1854, Metropolitan Museum of Art, New York
- Hudson River Landscape, 1854, Arnot Art Museum, Elmira, NY
- View on the Ohio River, 1855, Milwaukee Art Museum, Milwaukee, WI
- Landscape: Evening, 1856, Pennsylvania Academy of Fine Arts, Philadelphia, PA
- A Scene in the Catskills, 1858, National Gallery of Art, Washington, D.C.
- Chestnut Hill Near Philadelphia, 1863 and Landscape with Two Cows, Woodmere Art Museum, Philadelphia, PA
- Swiss Landscape, 1859, Museum of Fine Arts, Boston, Boston, MA
- Forest scene, mid-1800s, The Walters Art Museum, Baltimore, MD
- Summer Landscape, 1861 and Haying Scene, 1863, Samuel Dorsky Museum, New Paltz, NY
- Pennsylvania Landscape, 1862, High Museum of Art, Atlanta, GA
- Crater Lake in Scottish Highlands, 1861 and Steep Coast (Mediterranean Landscape),1863, Neue Pinakothek, Munich, Germany
- Braddock's Field, 1854; Braddock's Grave and Fort Necessity, 1855, Fort Ligonier

== Awards ==
- 1858: Silver medal at the Pennsylvania Academy of Fine Arts, Philadelphia
- 1865: Golden medal at the exhibition at the London Crystal Palace

== Exhibitions (selection) ==
- 1901: VIII. International art exhibition in the glass palace, Munich
- 1902 Great Berlin Art Exhibition
- 1912: Munich annual exhibition in the glass palace
- 1917: Paul Weber Memorial at the Heinemann Gallery, Munich
- 1918: Paul Weber Darmstädter Kunstverein
