= David Johnson (American artist) =

American painter

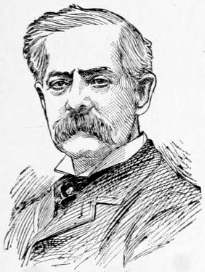
- Born: May 10, 1827; New York City, New York
- Died: January 30, 1908 (aged 80); Walden, New York
- Education: National Academy of Design

David Johnson (May 10, 1827 – January 30, 1908) was an American painter, a member of the second generation of Hudson River School painters.

== Biography ==
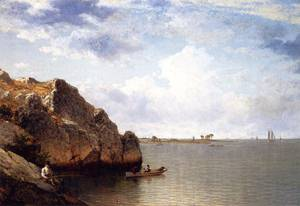
Near Noroton Connecticut (1875)

Johnson was born in New York City, New York. He studied for two years at the antique school of the National Academy of Design and also studied briefly with the Hudson River artist Jasper Francis Cropsey. Along with John Frederick Kensett and John William Casilear, he was best known for the development of Luminism.

On the back of a painting made at Haines Falls, Kauterskill Clove, in 1849, Johnson wrote "My first study from nature. Made in company with J.F. Kensett, and J.W. Casilear,". By 1850, Johnson was exhibiting regularly at the National Academy of Design in New York, where he became an associate in 1859; in 1861 he was elected a full Academician.

Johnson's signature works are usually small in format, tightly painted, delicately handled and richly colored. Based on copious preliminary drawings and studies of specific trees in their natural environment, his paintings are accurate and inviting representations of Northeastern scenery and 'exquisite examples of the style that is now called Luminism.' Johnson painted numerous Lake George scenes between the late 1860s and early 1870s, including View of Dresden, Lake George (below).

Johnson's greatest success was achieved during the mid-1870s, when he exhibited paintings of such popular landscape locales as the Catskills, Lake George and the White Mountains, as well as pastoral scenes of central New York state, an area which he was the only important artist of the era to frequent. He exhibited extensively in major American art centers, including Chicago, Boston and Philadelphia, and at the Paris Salon of 1877. Subsequently his work changed to reflect the influence of the French Barbizon school, a stylistic transition that met with harsh critical reception from his colleagues, but which paralleled the dilemma faced by Hudson River school painters seeking to stay relevant as aesthetic tastes changed. Bayside, New Rochelle, New York (below) is an example of Johnson's later work, when the Barbizon influence eclipsed his earlier debt to the Hudson River school.

Johnson died at his home in Walden, New York on January 30, 1908.

== Gallery ==
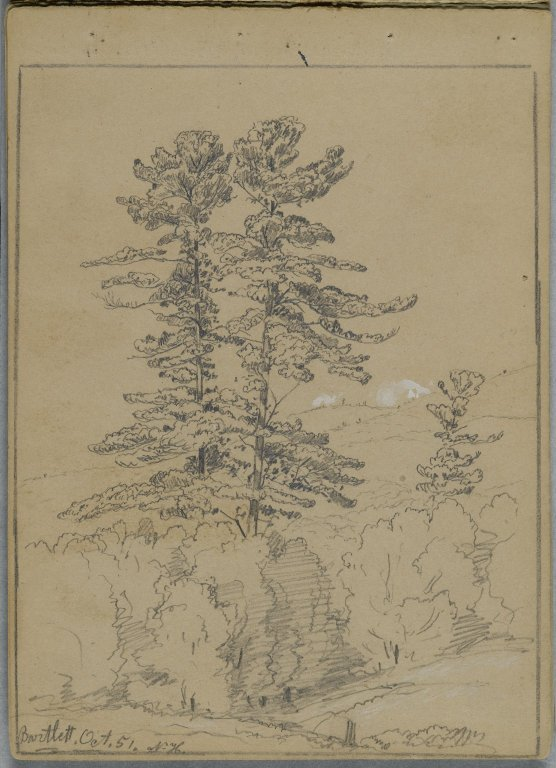
Sketchbook Conway New Hampshire - Brooklyn Museum

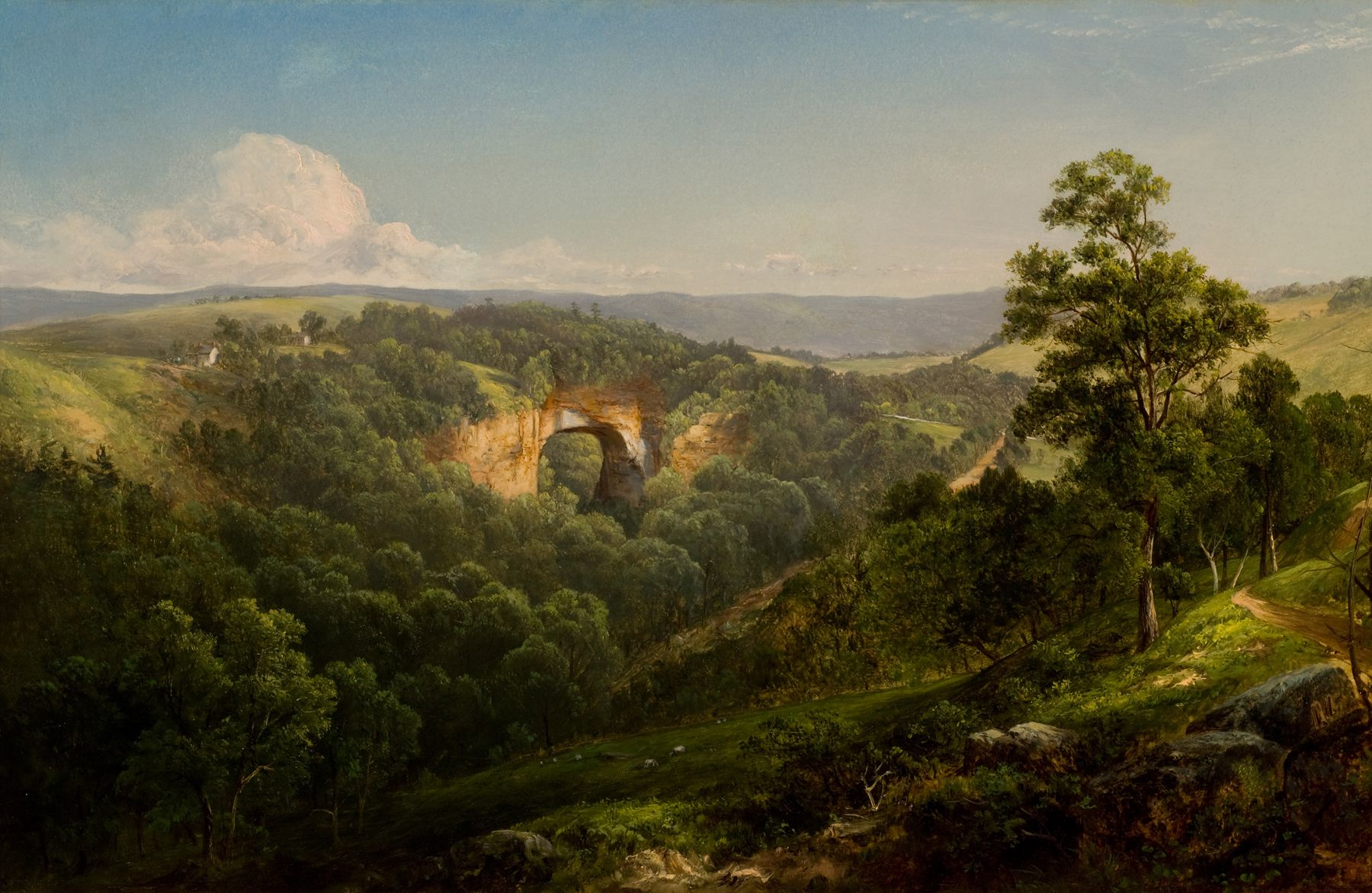
Natural Bridge, Virginia, 1860 - Reynolda House Museum of American Art

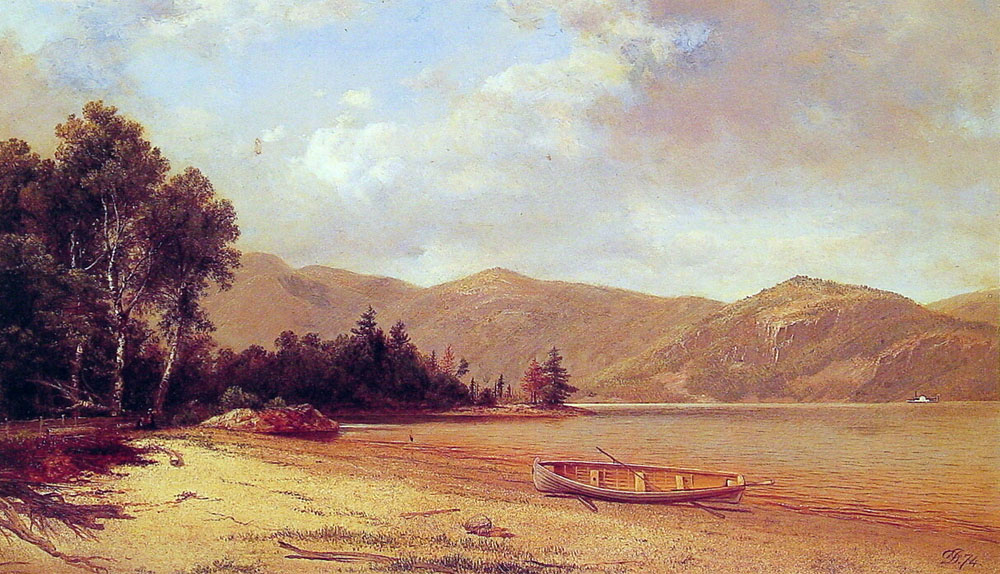
View of Dresden, Lake George, 1874

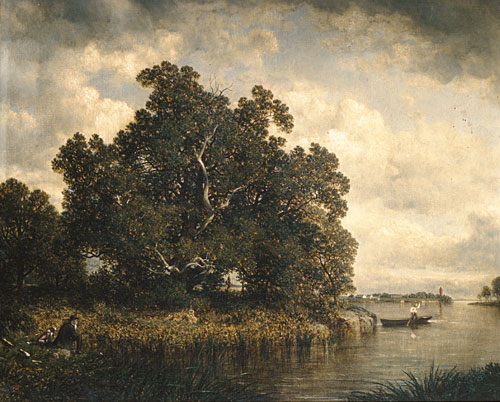
Bayside, New Rochelle, New York, 1886 - Metropolitan Museum of Art

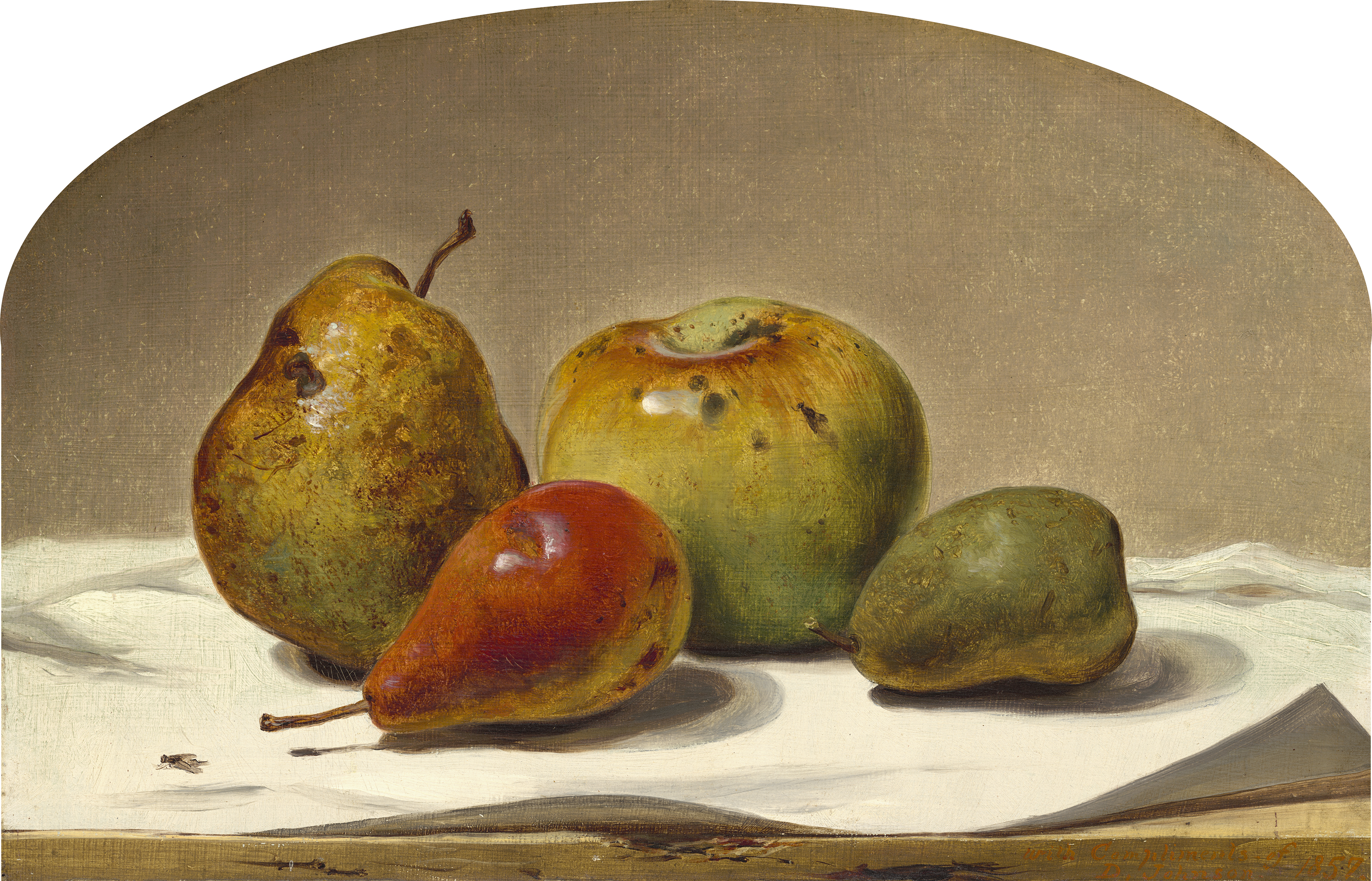
Three Pears and an Apple, 1857 - National Gallery of Art

== See also ==
- List of Hudson River School artists
