= Johann Hermann Carmiencke =

German painter

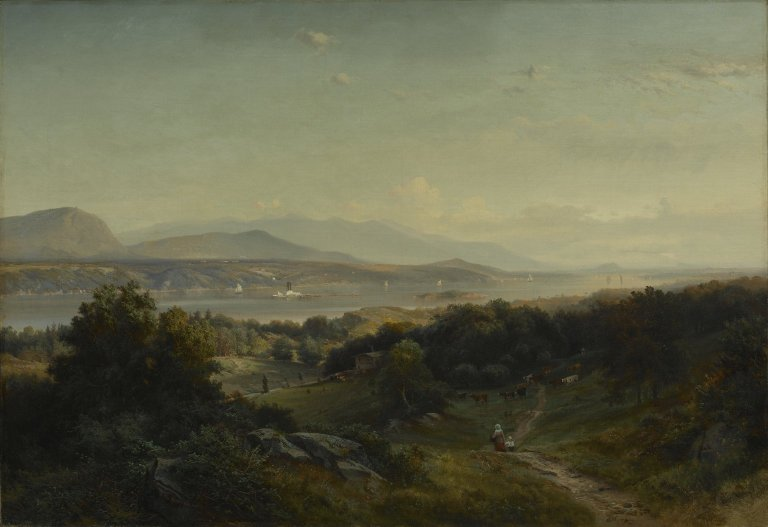
Landscape, Hyde Park, New York, ca. 1859, Brooklyn Museum

Johann Hermann Carmiencke or John Hermann Carmiencke (1810 – 15 June 1867) was a German landscape painter and etcher.

== Biography ==
He was born in Hamburg. He went to Dresden in 1831 as a journeyman painter, and while there studied in Dahl's school. Thence he went to Copenhagen in 1834, where he studied in the Academy, and, after moving to Leipzig, received instruction there from Sohonberg. Returning to Copenhagen in 1838, he proceeded to travel as an artist in Sweden, Bavaria, and the Tyrol, visiting Italy from 1845 to 1846. He was then appointed court painter to Christian VIII, for whom he executed many works.

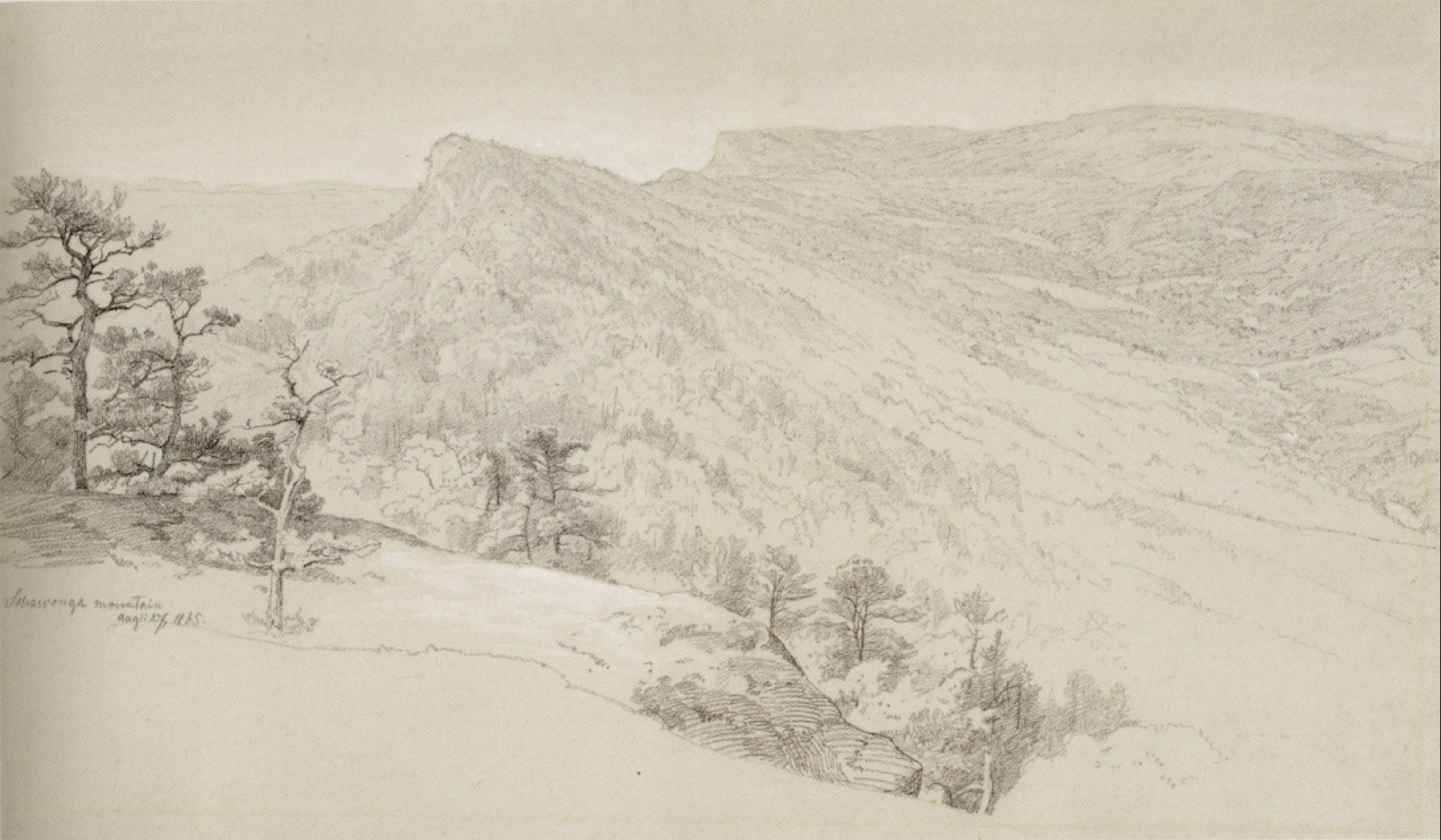
View of the Shawangunke Mountains, 1865, Honolulu Museum of Art

In consequence of the First Schleswig War, he went in 1851 to New York, where he was well received, and admitted into the Academy of Brooklyn, and the Artists' Fund Society, in which he was very active. He was a successful teacher. He died in 1867 in Brooklyn, New York.

== Works ==
His works were mainly groups of mountain ranges, which were very effectively rendered, and possessed an excellent tone — the execution being simple and true to nature. The Mountain Tarn and the View on the Zillerthal may be particularly noticed. There are thirty-five careful etchings of landscapes by him, some of which were published by the Art Association of Copenhagen in 1850 and 1851.

== Selected works ==
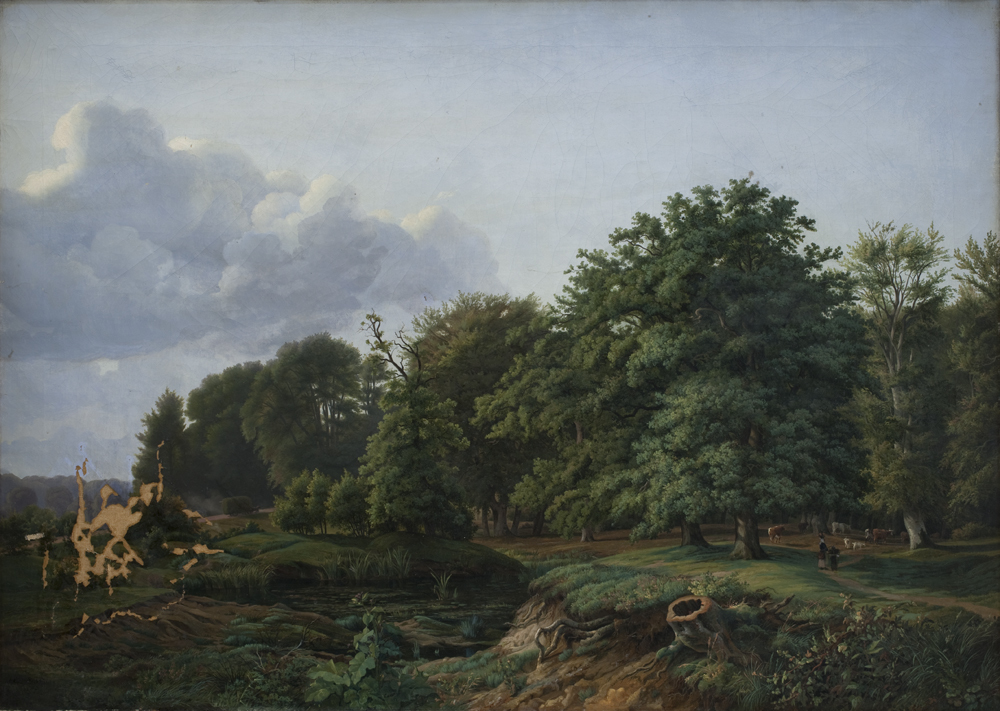
A Forrest near Hellebæk in the North of Zealand. Afternoon (1835)

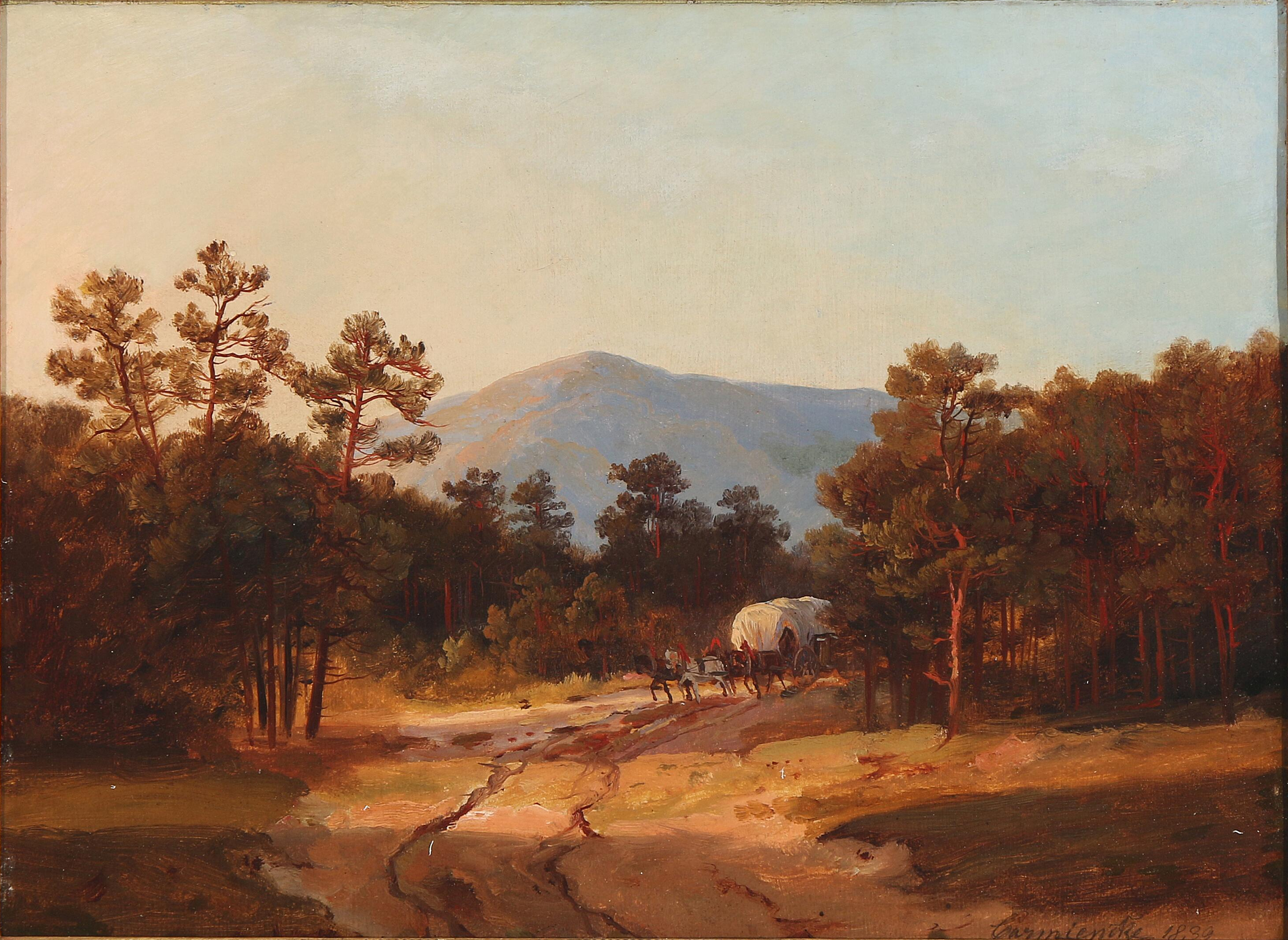
Horse-drawn Coach in the Forest (1839)

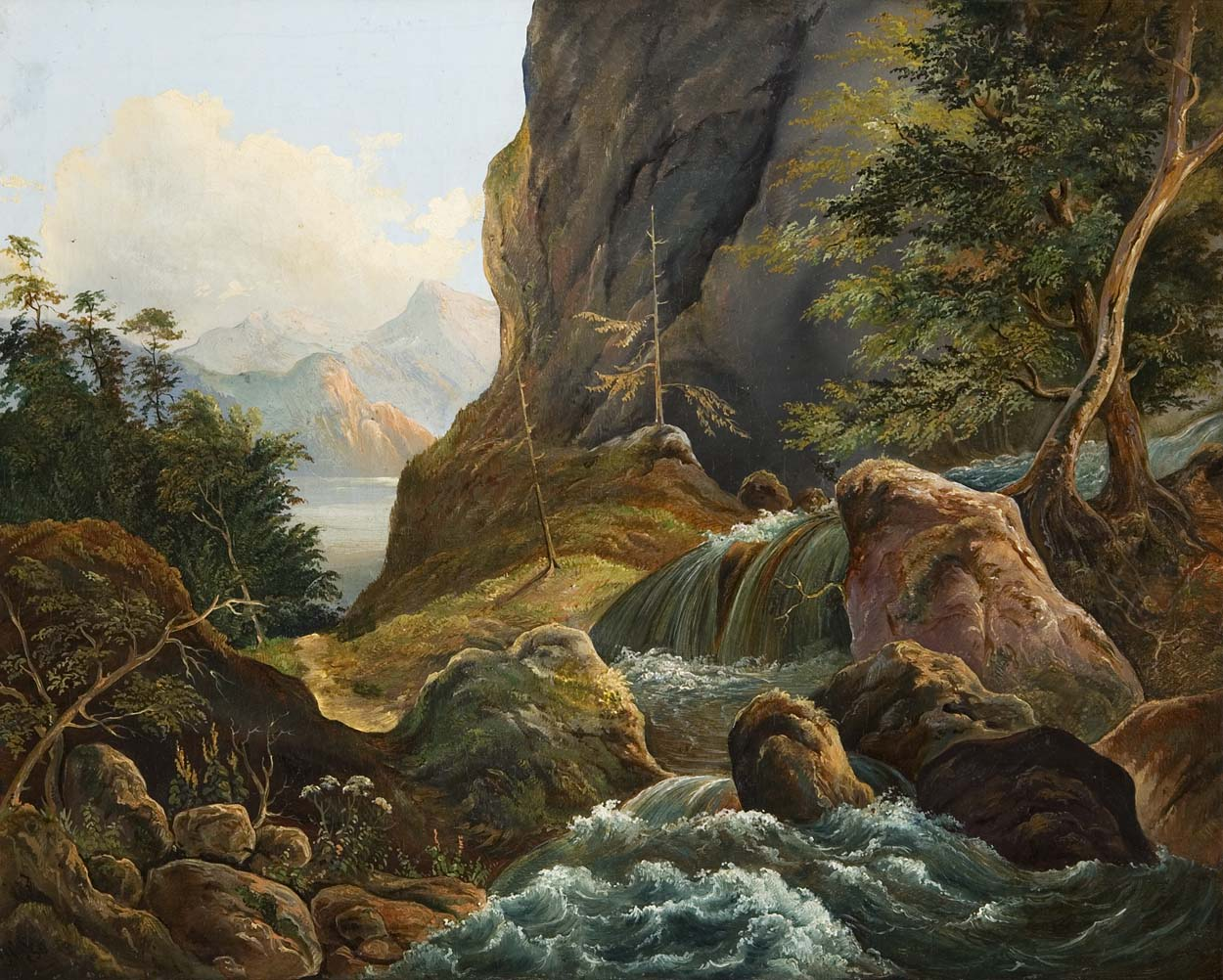
Mountain Stream (1850)

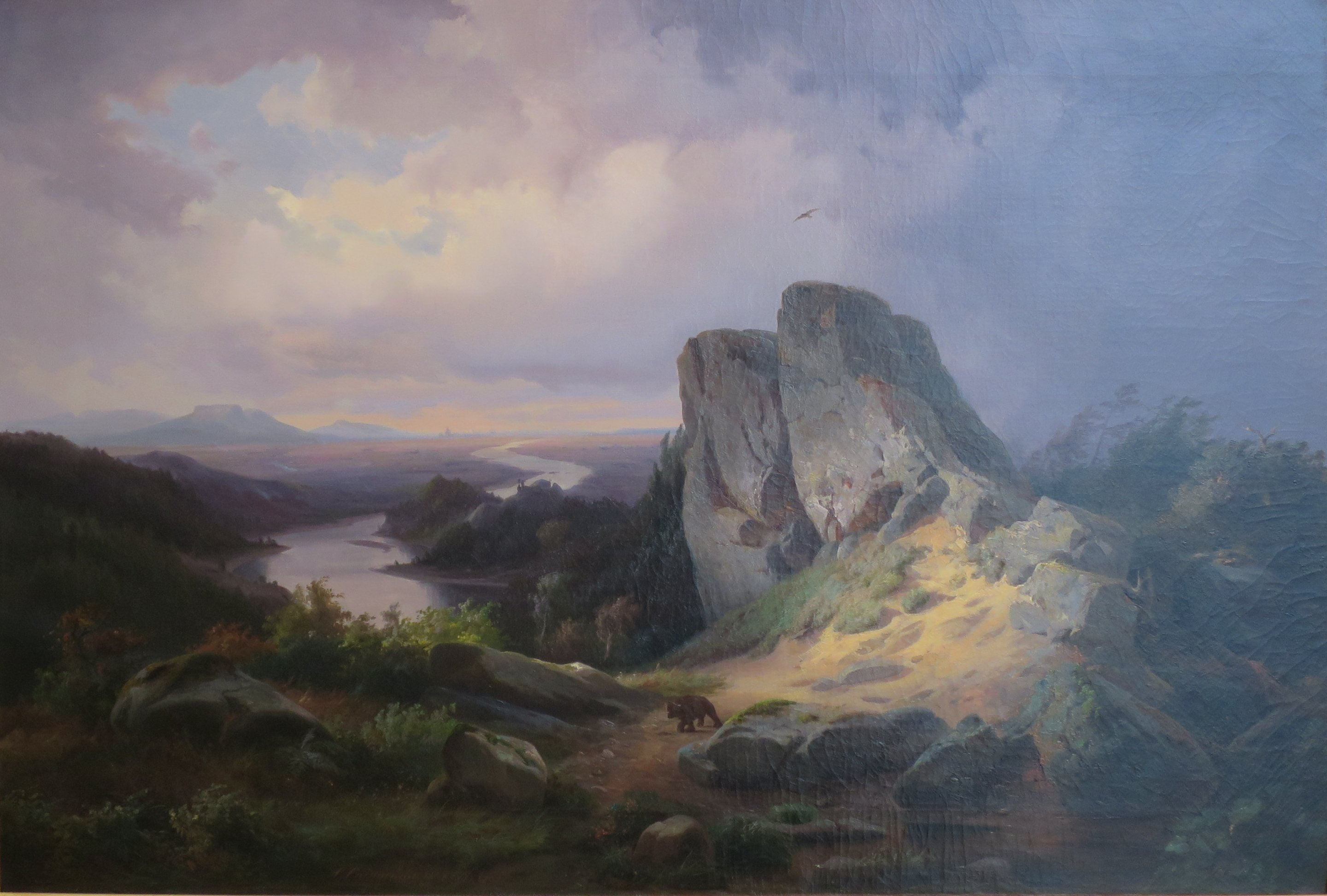
Western Landscape (1853)

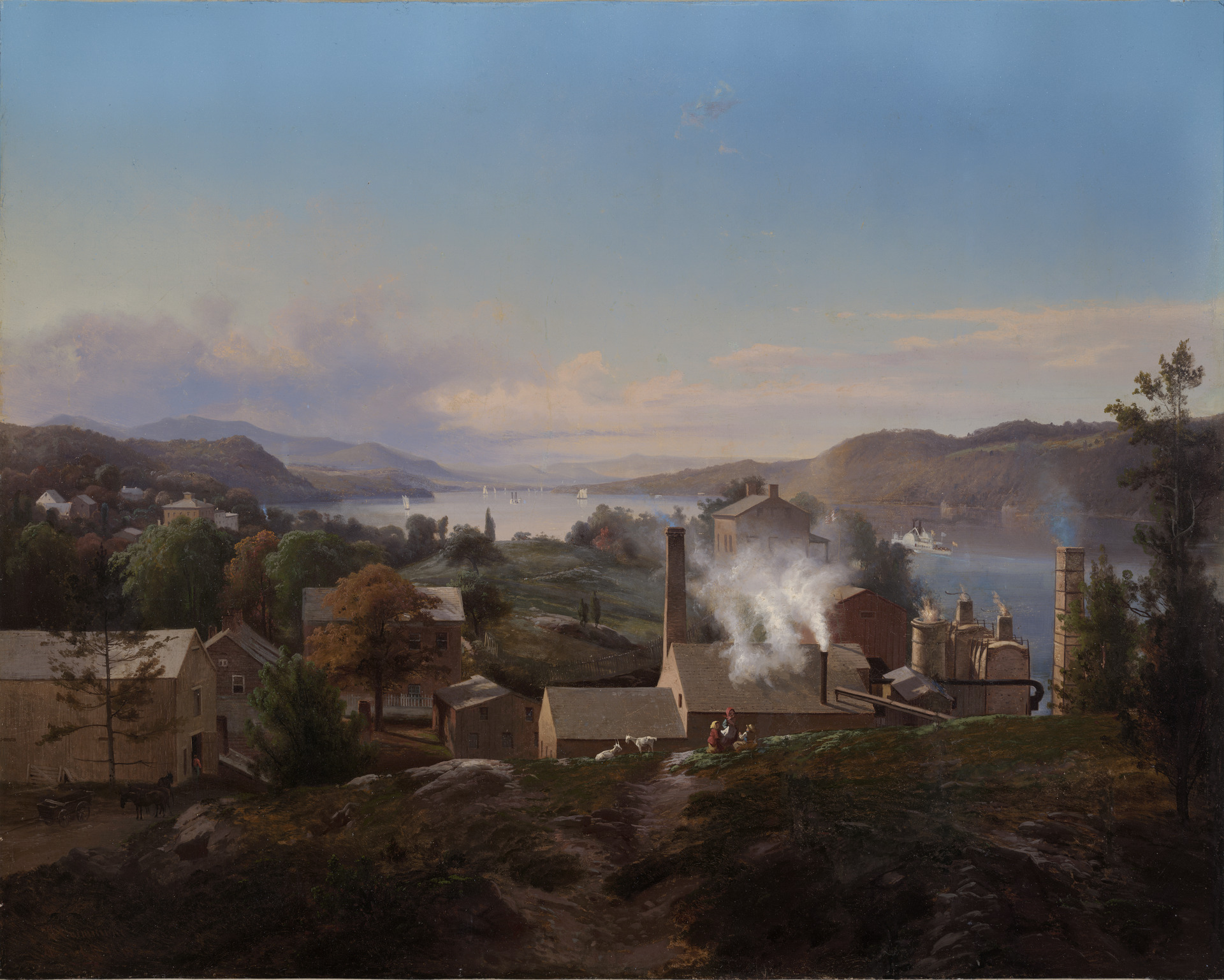
Poughkeepsie Iron Works (Bech’s Furnace) (1856)

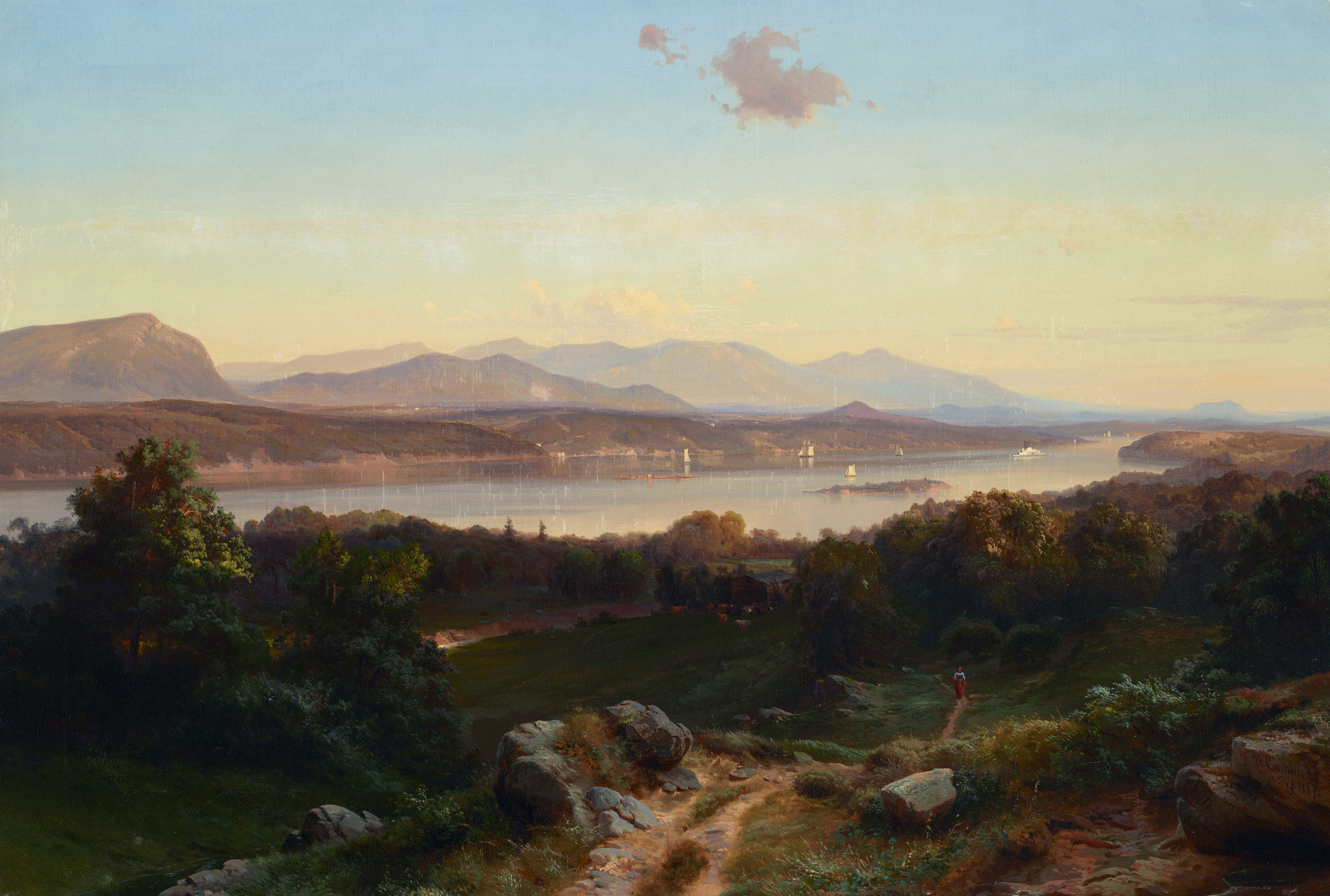
Hyde Park on the Hudson River (1857)

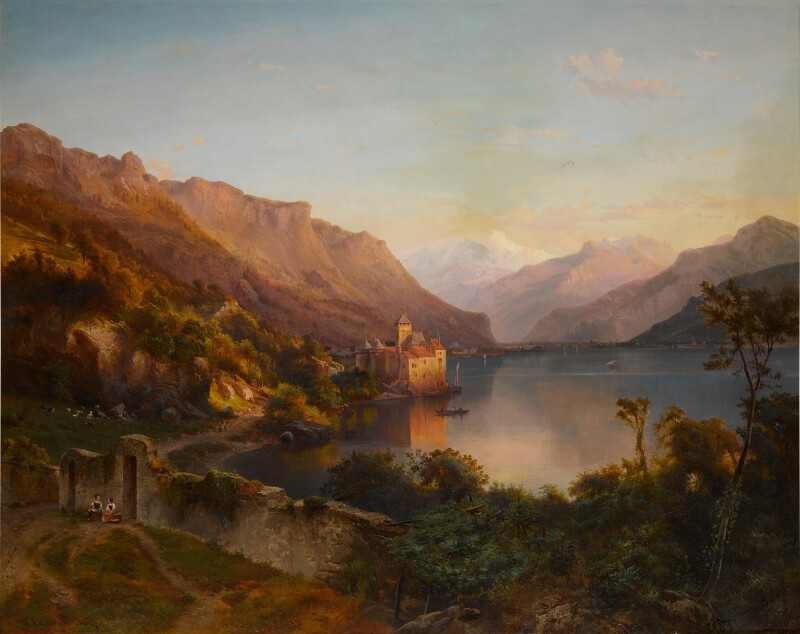
View of the Castle of Chillon (1858)

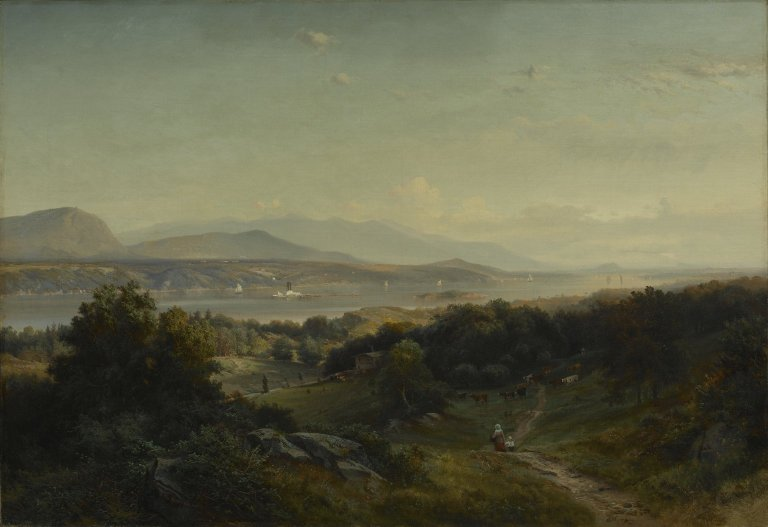
Landscape, Hyde Park, New York (c. 1859)

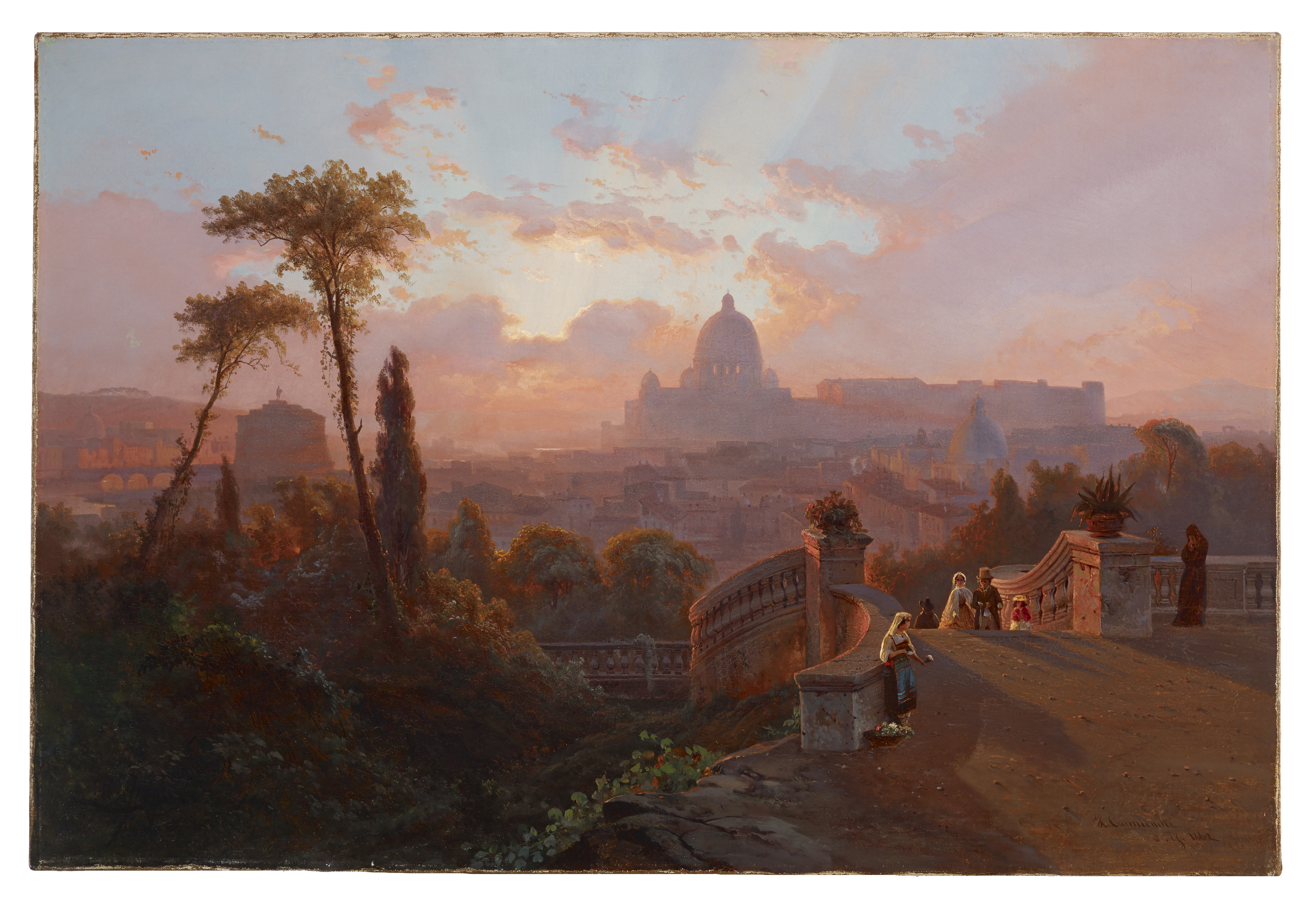
View of Rome (1862)
