= William Mason Brown =

American artist

William Mason Brown (c. 1828–1898) was an American artist.

== Early life ==
Born in Troy, New York.

== Education ==
Brown began his career as a portraitist, studying under Abel Buell Moore, Troy’s preferred portraitist.

== Career ==
Brown painted portraits, landscapes, and trompe-l'œil still lifes.

One of the better known of the Hudson River School’s second generation, he was renowned for romantic landscapes and still lifes.

He was influenced by Thomas Cole and others of the first generation of the Hudson River’s School, Brown was also heavily influenced by the Pre-Raphaelite's.

In 1850, he moved to Newark, New Jersey, and began specializing in landscape painting.

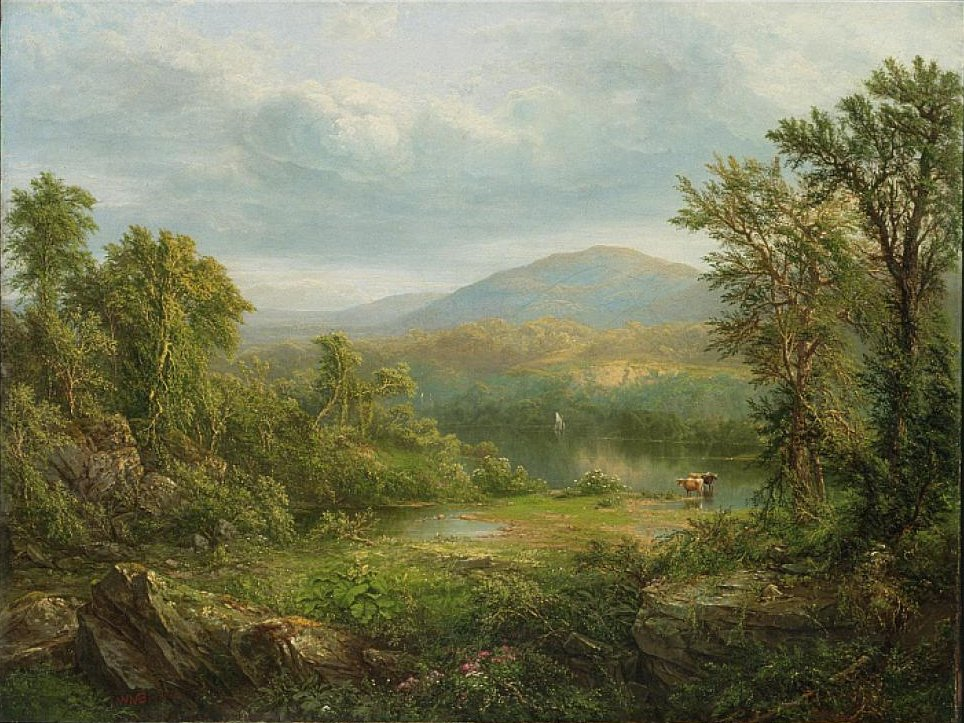
Lake Losepe by William Mason Brown (c. 1855).

In 1858, he moved to Brooklyn, New York, and switched to painting still lifes.

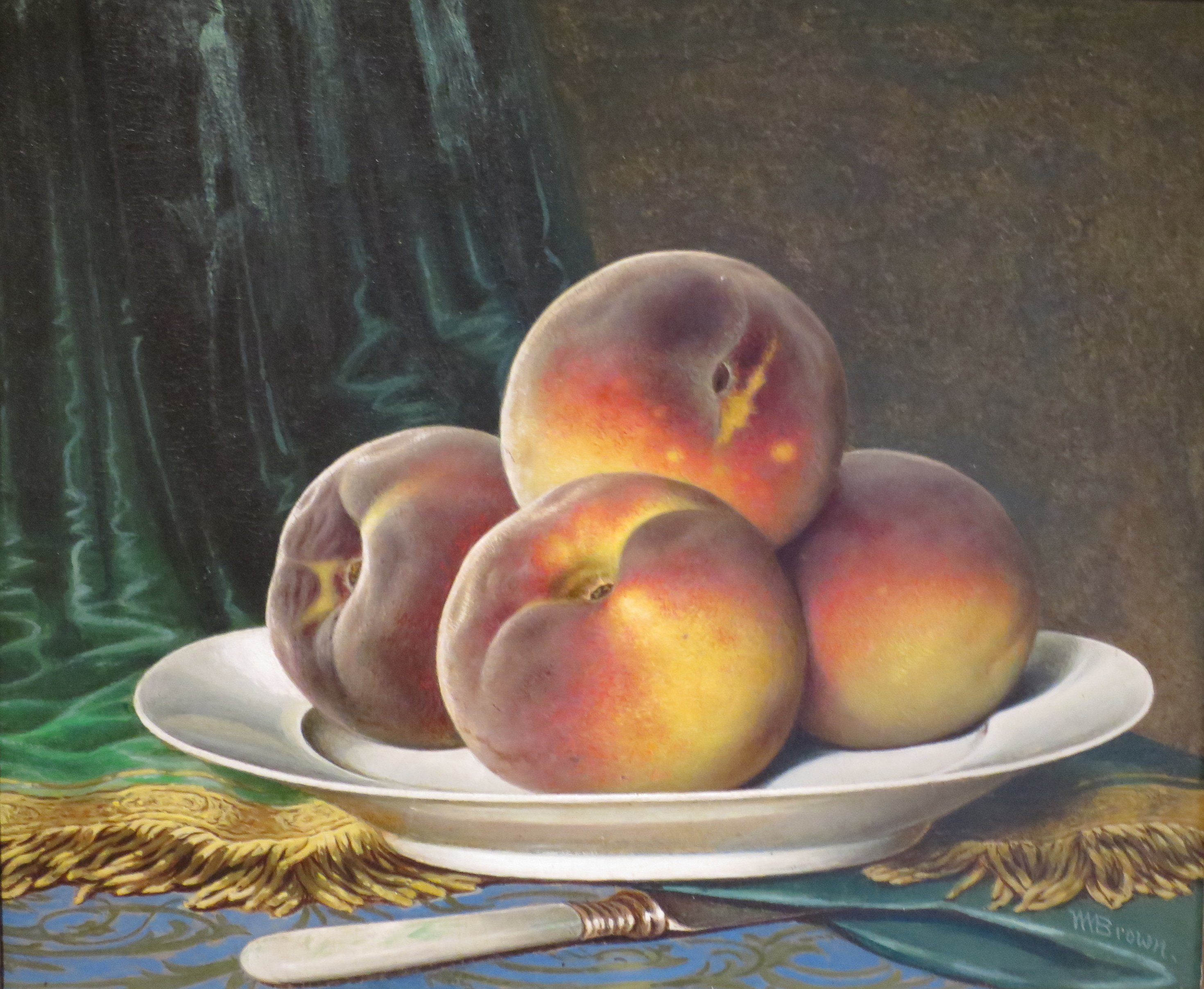
William Mason Brown - Peaches on a White Plate, c. 1880, High Museum

He exhibited at the National Academy of Design for thirty-one years.

His paintings are to be found at the Brooklyn Museum of Art, the Cleveland Museum of Art, the Corcoran Gallery of Art, and the Pennsylvania Academy of the Fine Arts.

He usually signed his work as Wm M Brown.

== Death ==
In 1898 Brown came down with heatstroke on August 26, and died at his home in Brooklyn, New York on September 2.

== Collections ==
His works are in the following collections:

- Brooklyn Museum of Art
