= William Charles Anthony Frerichs =

American painter

- Born: 1829; Ghent, United Kingdom of the Netherlands (now Belgium)
- Died: March 16, 1905 (aged 75–76); Tottenville, New York, U.S.
- Occupation: Painter

William Charles Anthony Frerichs (1829 – March 16, 1905) was an American landscape painter. Born in Ghent, he emigrated to the United States, taught at Greensboro Female College, and served in the Confederate States Army during the American Civil War of 1861–1865. After the war, he settled in Staten Island, New York state. His work is in the collections of the Asheville Art Museum, North Carolina Museum of Art, and the Samuel Dorsky Museum of Art at the State University of New York at New Paltz.

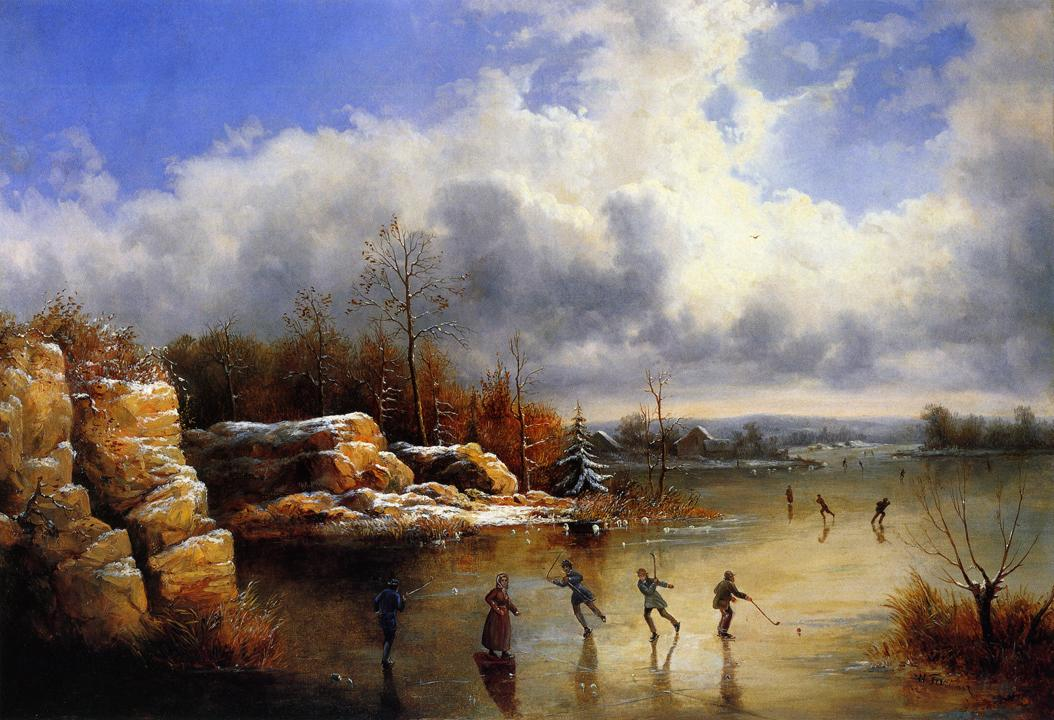
Ice Skating.
