= George Herbert McCord =

American painter

George McCord
- Born: New York City, New York, U.S.
- Known for: Painting
- Movement: Hudson River School

George McCord (August 1, 1848– April 6, 1909) was an American painter, known for atmospheric marine and landscape paintings in oil, pastel, and watercolor and for black and white drawings. McCord was born in New York City and remained primarily a resident in Brooklyn although he traveled widely and from 1883 also had a studio in Morristown, New Jersey. He was part of the second generation of Hudson River School painters.

He studied at the Hudson River Institute, the Claverack Academy in Claverack, New York.
