= William Stanley Haseltine =

American painter (1835–1900)

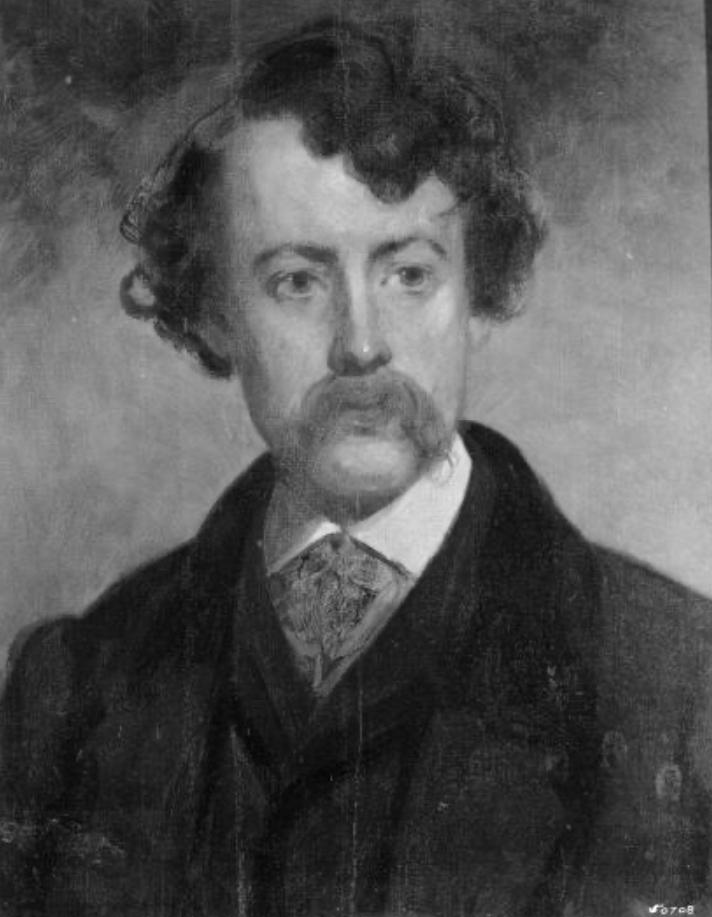
- Portrait of Haseltine by William Oliver Stone
- Born: June 11, 1835; Philadelphia, Pennsylvania, US
- Died: February 3, 1900 (aged 64); Rome, Italy
- Education: University of Pennsylvania, Harvard University
- Known for: Painting, drawing
- Movement: Luminism

William Stanley Haseltine (June 11, 1835 – February 3, 1900) was an American painter and draftsman who was associated with the Düsseldorf school of painting, the Hudson River School and Luminism.

== Early life and education ==
Born on June 11, 1835, in Philadelphia, to businessman John Haseltine and Elizabeth Shinn Haseltine, an amateur landscape painter, Haseltine studied at the University of Pennsylvania and then at Harvard University, where he received a degree in 1854.

== Career ==
He first exhibited his paintings the following year at the Pennsylvania Academy of Fine Arts, after which he sailed to Europe, first joining a colony of American painters who were studying in Düsseldorf, then traveling up the Rhine into Switzerland and Italy. In late 1857, he settled in Rome, and in the following months made numerous excursions to draw the landscape around Rome and on Capri.

In 1858, Haseltine returned to Philadelphia, and by late 1859 was installed in the Tenth Street Studio Building in New York City, then a central point for American landscape painters; also in the building were Frederic Edwin Church, Albert Bierstadt, and Worthington Whittredge, the latter two having befriended Haseltine in Europe. Though many of his paintings from this time derived from his European sketches, Haseltine also began to paint the oceanside of New England, especially favoring the rockbound coasts of Narragansett, Rhode Island, Nahant, Massachusetts, and Mount Desert Island, Maine. The precision with which he painted these landscapes won critical praise, and Haseltine was elected an Associate of the National Academy of Design in 1860, and a full Academician in 1861. A study of 'The rocks at Nahant' is in Chapter 6 of Rebecca Bedell's 'The Anatomy of Nature'.

In 1864, Haseltine's wife died in childbirth. He spent some time training his nephew, Howard Russell Butler, until he married Helen Marshall in 1866 and relocated to Europe. Initially the family considered settling in Paris, but in 1867 they moved to Rome, which would for most of Haseltine's subsequent years serve as his home and point of departure from which to produce views of the European landscape. While his paintings of Capri and Sicily would prove popular with visiting American tourists, Haseltine also traveled and drew in France, Belgium, and the Netherlands, summering in Bavaria and the Tyrol in the 1880s and 1890s. In his later years, he also returned periodically to the United States, making a final trip to the west in 1899.

Haseltine died of pneumonia in Rome, on February 3, 1900, aged 64, and was buried at the Protestant cemetery in Rome on Via Caio Cestio, about 5 km from the Episcopal Church of Saint Paul's Within The Walls, of which he was one of the founding members. His son Herbert Chevalier Haseltine became one of the most celebrated sculptors of animals, especially horses. Some of his most famous works were done for clients such as Barbara Hutton and Guy de Rothschild.

== Gallery ==
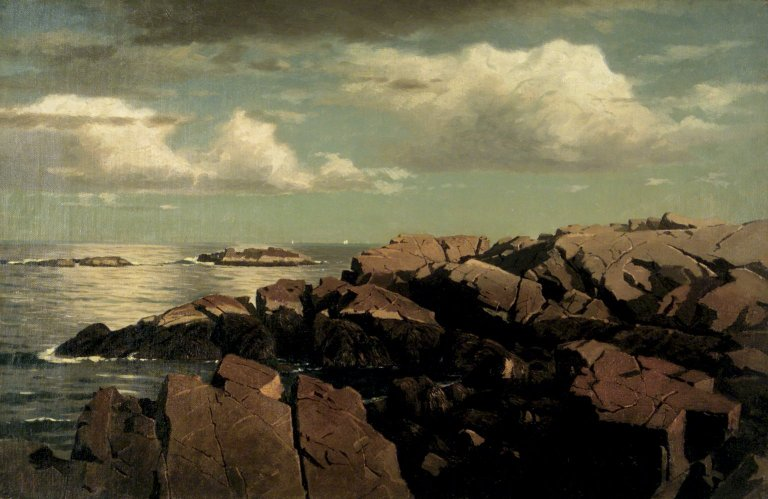
After a Shower -- Nahant, Massachusetts (1864) - Brooklyn Museum

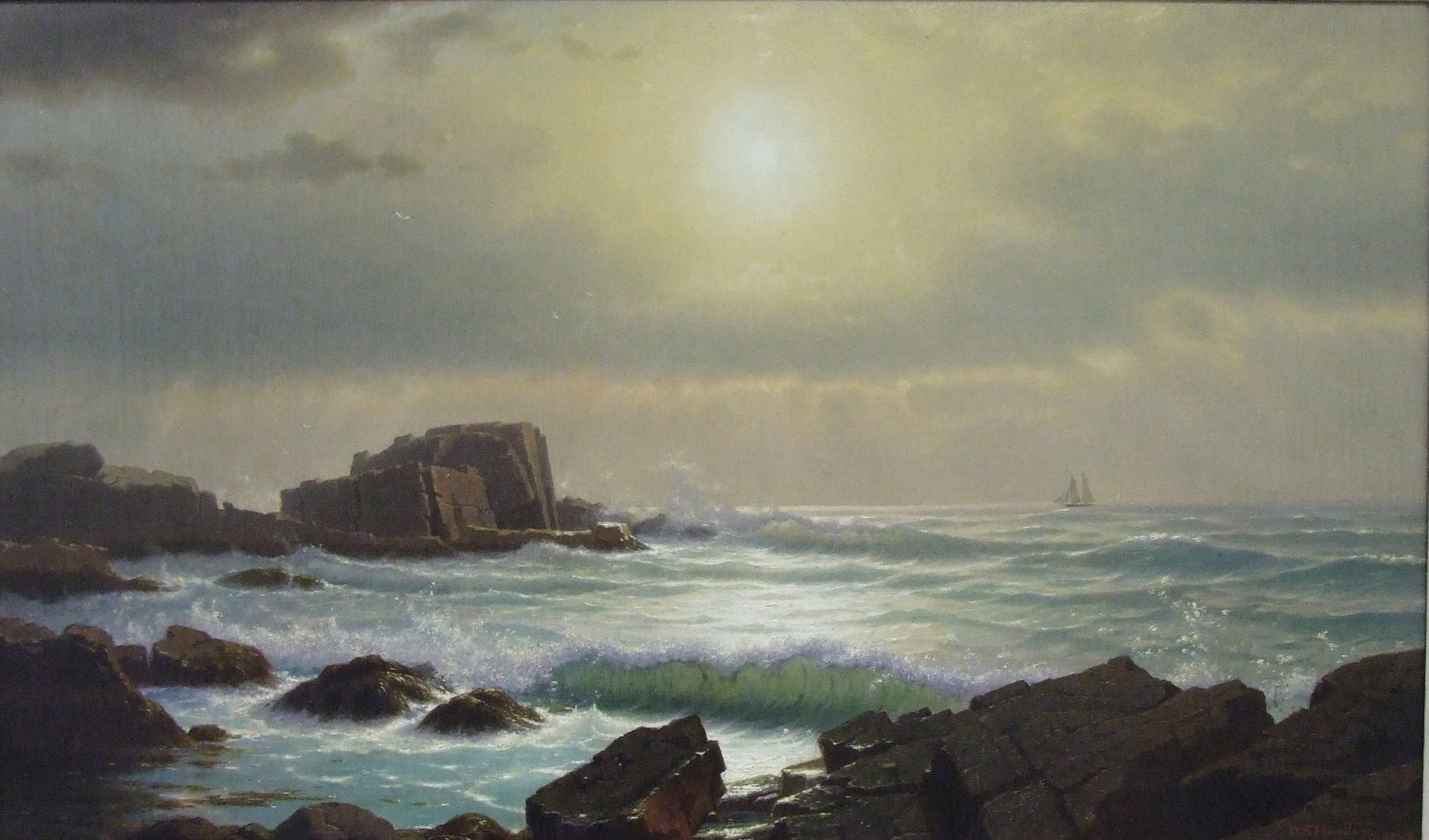
Castle Rocks at Nahant, Massachusetts (1865) in the collection at The Mariners' Museum

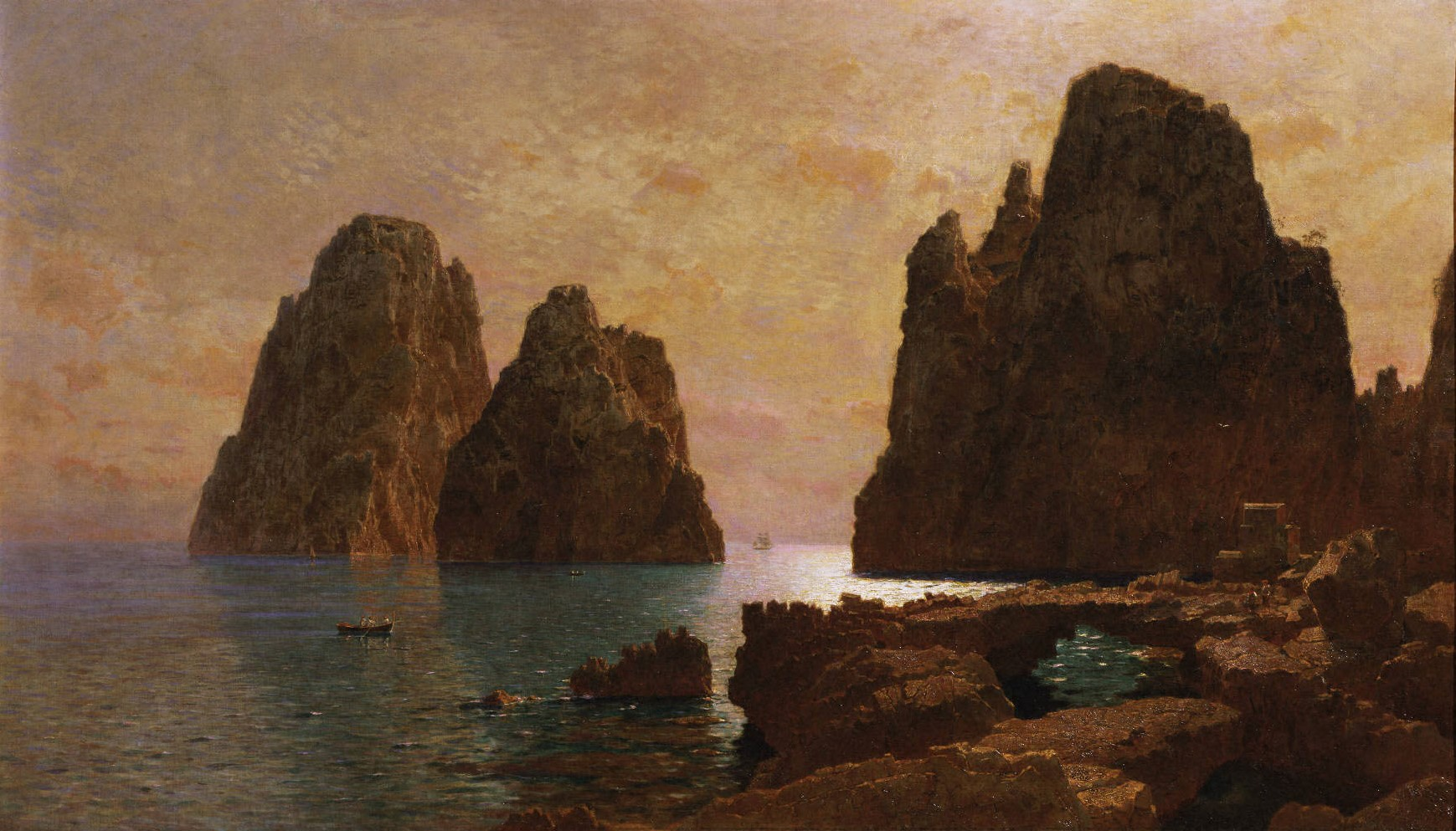
Isle of Capri: The Faraglioni, 1870s, Princeton University Art Museum

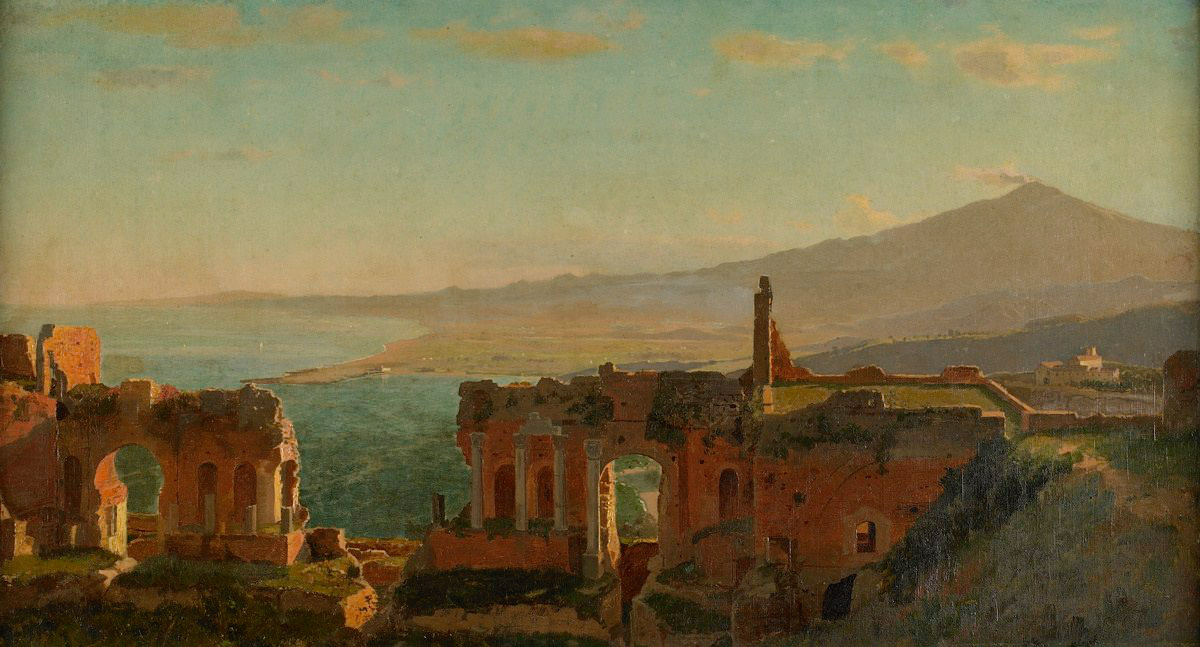
Mt. Aetna from Taormina (1871) held at the Birmingham Museum of Art

== See also ==
- List of Hudson River School artists
