= Harriet Cany Peale =

American painter

Harriet Christina Cany Peale
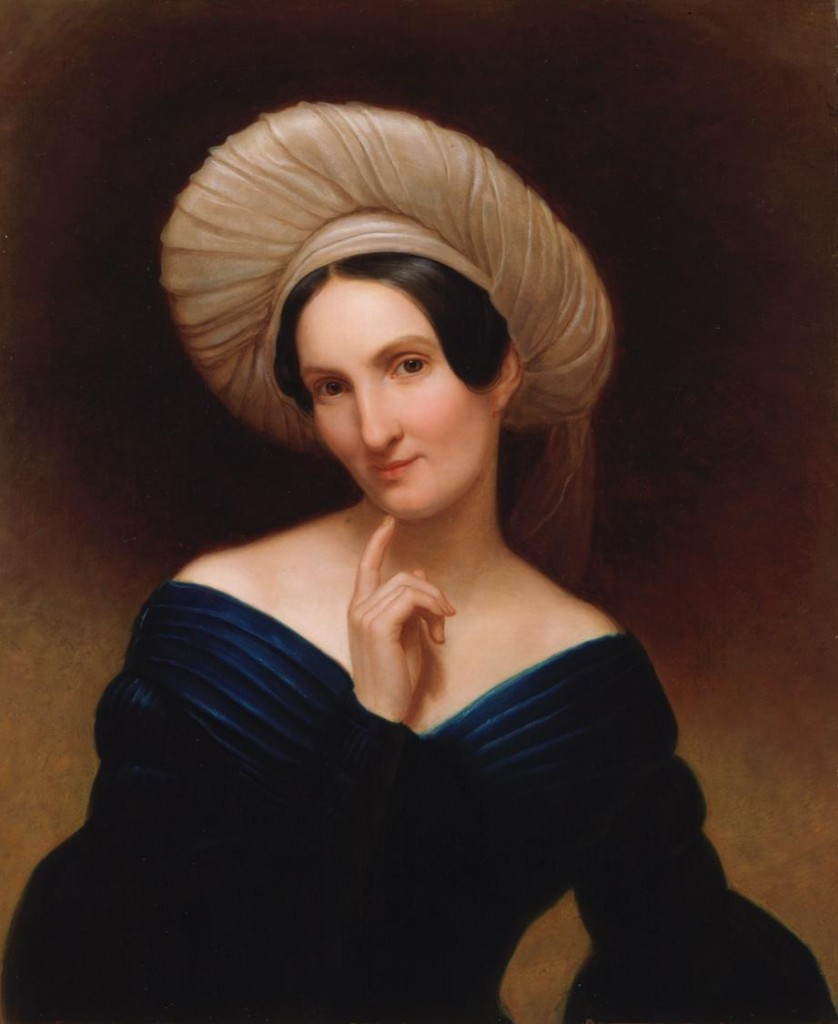
- Rembrandt Peale. Portrait of a Lady (Harriet Cany Peale), ca. 1840. In the collection of the Chrysler Museum, Norfolk, Virginia.
- Born: 1799
- Died: January 12, 1869 (aged 69–70)
- Resting place: Saint Mary's Catholic Churchyard, Philadelphia, PA
- Notable work: Her Mistress's Clothes, 1845; Kaaterskill Clove, 1858
- Style: Hudson River School
- Spouse: Rembrandt Peale (m. 1840; died 1860)

Harriet Christina Cany Peale (1799 – January 12, 1869) was an American landscape, portrait, and genre painter of the mid-nineteenth century. Although sometimes described as a copyist, a greater share of her oeuvre has been made public in recent years, allowing Cany Peale to earn recognition for her genre and landscape paintings. She has been located in contemporary scholarship as an artist of the Hudson River School.

== Family ==
Harriet Christina Cany was born in 1799, the daughter of Charles and Mary Cany, in Philadelphia. She was widowed sometime before 1840, and worked in her family's "fancy goods business." She studied with the artist Rembrandt Peale, whom she married in 1840, becoming his second wife. Her association with the more famous Peale usually places her within the famous Peale family of painters, overshadowing her individual achievements as an artist in her own right.

== Career ==
Harriet Cany Peale first exhibited in 1840 at the Pennsylvania Academy of Fine Arts, where she continued to exhibit for the rest of her life, as well as at the Artists' Fund Society. She and her husband shared a studio in Philadelphia.

Her 1848 painting, Her Mistress's Clothes (private collection) has gained notoriety for its exploration of power differentiation in a scene of an African American woman dressed—presumably by her employer—in a bourgeois white woman's clothes and jewelry. Cany Peale depicts the "mistress" as an ideal, serene, light-skinned figure clasping the neck of the African American servant, whose features appear cruder in contrast. Together, they peer into a mirror to examine the effect of the clothes (relics of an earlier generation) and jewelry on the servant.

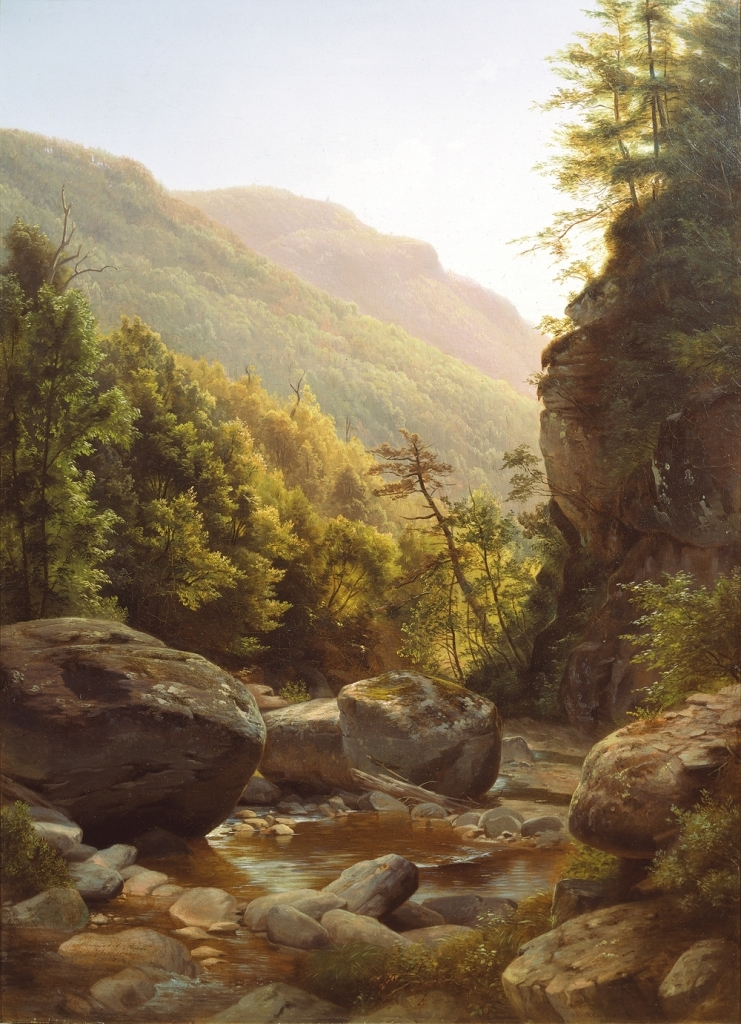
Harriet Cany Peale. Kaaterskill Clove, 1858. Hudson River School landscape (private collection).

Her landscape, Kaaterskill Clove (also in a private collection), was the key landscape image of the 2010 traveling exhibition, "Remember the Ladies: Women Artists of the Hudson River School," organized by the Thomas Cole Historic Site.

Harriet Cany Peale died in 1869.

== Collections ==
- Charles S. and Isabella V. McMullen Museum, Boston College, Boston, MA
- Chrysler Museum of Art, Norfolk, VA
- Pennsylvania Academy of the Fine Arts, Philadelphia, PA
- The Newark Museum, Newark, NJ
- The Washington County Museum of Fine Arts, Hagerstown, MD
