= Charles Henry Chapin =

American painter (1830–1889)

Charles Henry Chapin (1830–1889) was an American landscape and portrait painter. One of his paintings is at the Samuel Dorsky Museum of Art at the State University of New York at New Paltz.

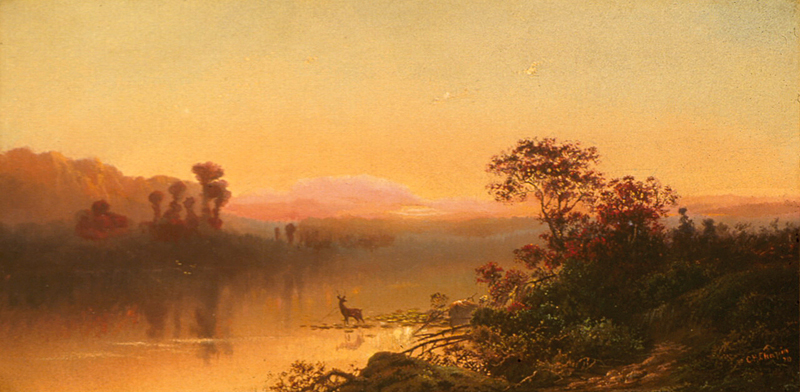
Deer.
