= Thomas Prichard Rossiter =

American artist (1818–1871)

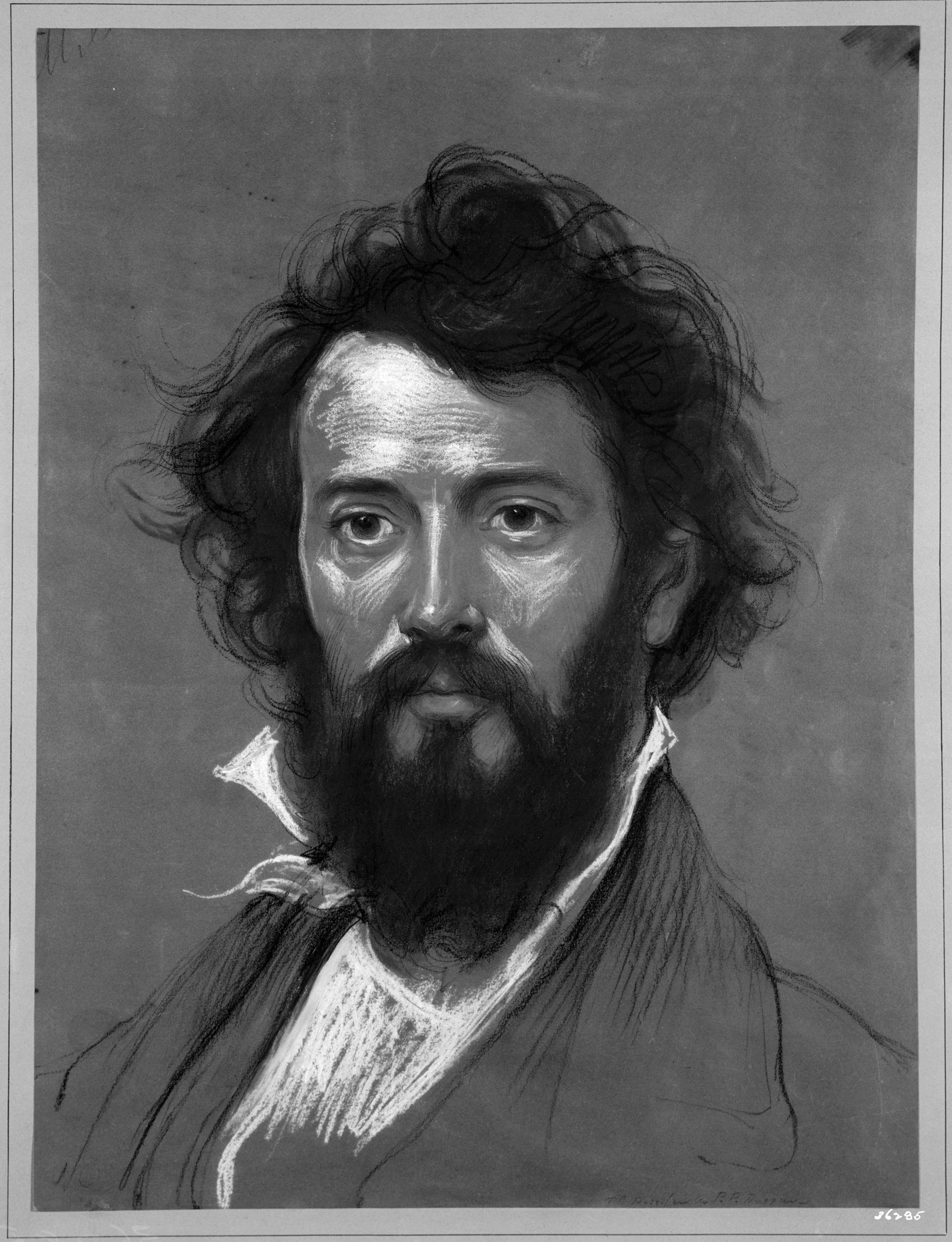
- Peter Paul Duggan, Portrait of Thomas Pritchard Rossiter, black crayon on brown paper, 19 1/8 x 14 3/8 in., The Century Association, New York
- Born: 1818; New Haven, Connecticut
- Died: 1871 (aged 52–53); Cold Spring, New York
- Known for: Artist

Thomas Prichard Rossiter (1818–1871) was an American artist born in New Haven, Connecticut. Known for his portraits and paintings of historical scenes, he later came to be associated with the Hudson River School of artists.

== Life and career ==
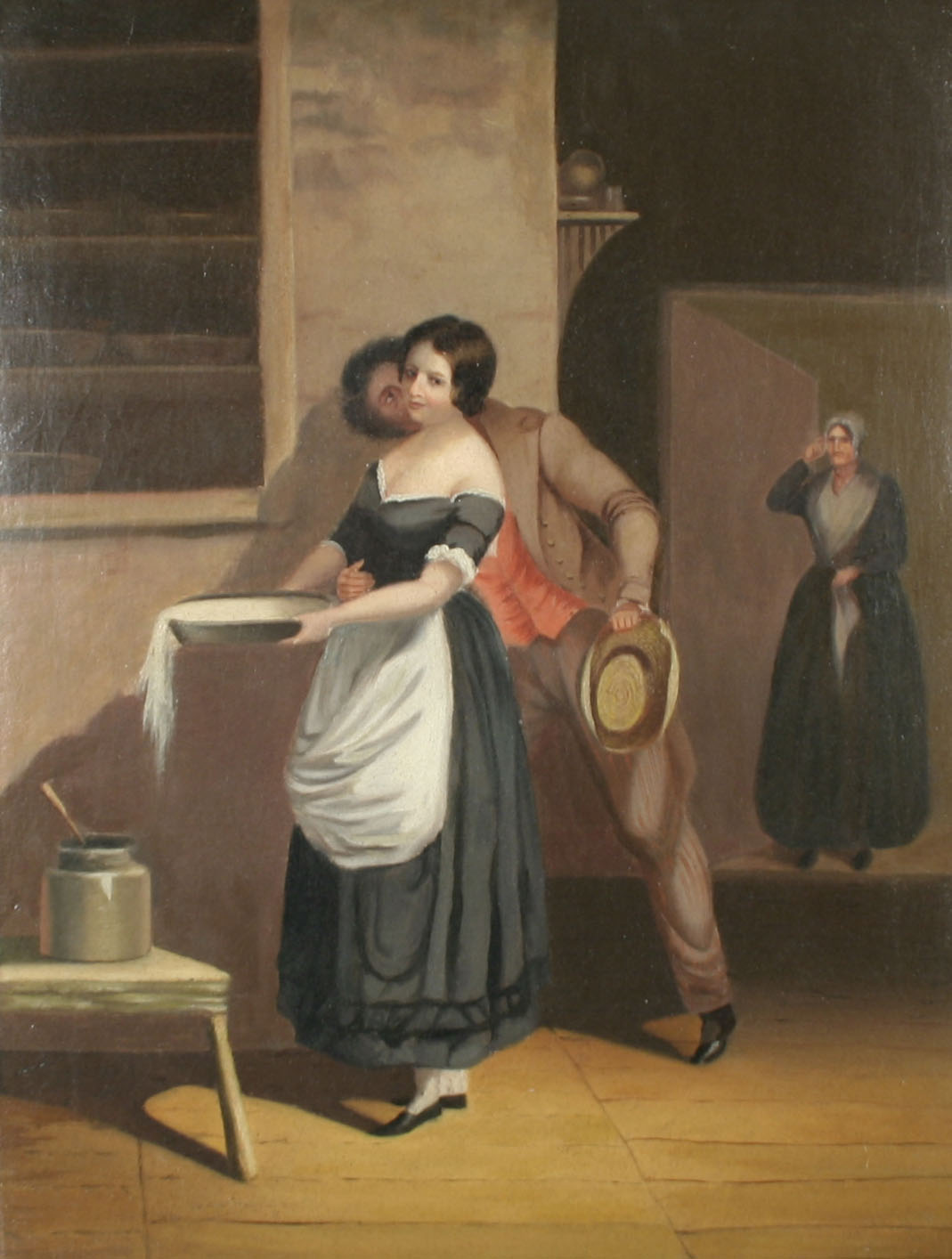
Spilt Milk, by Thomas Prichard Rossiter, undated

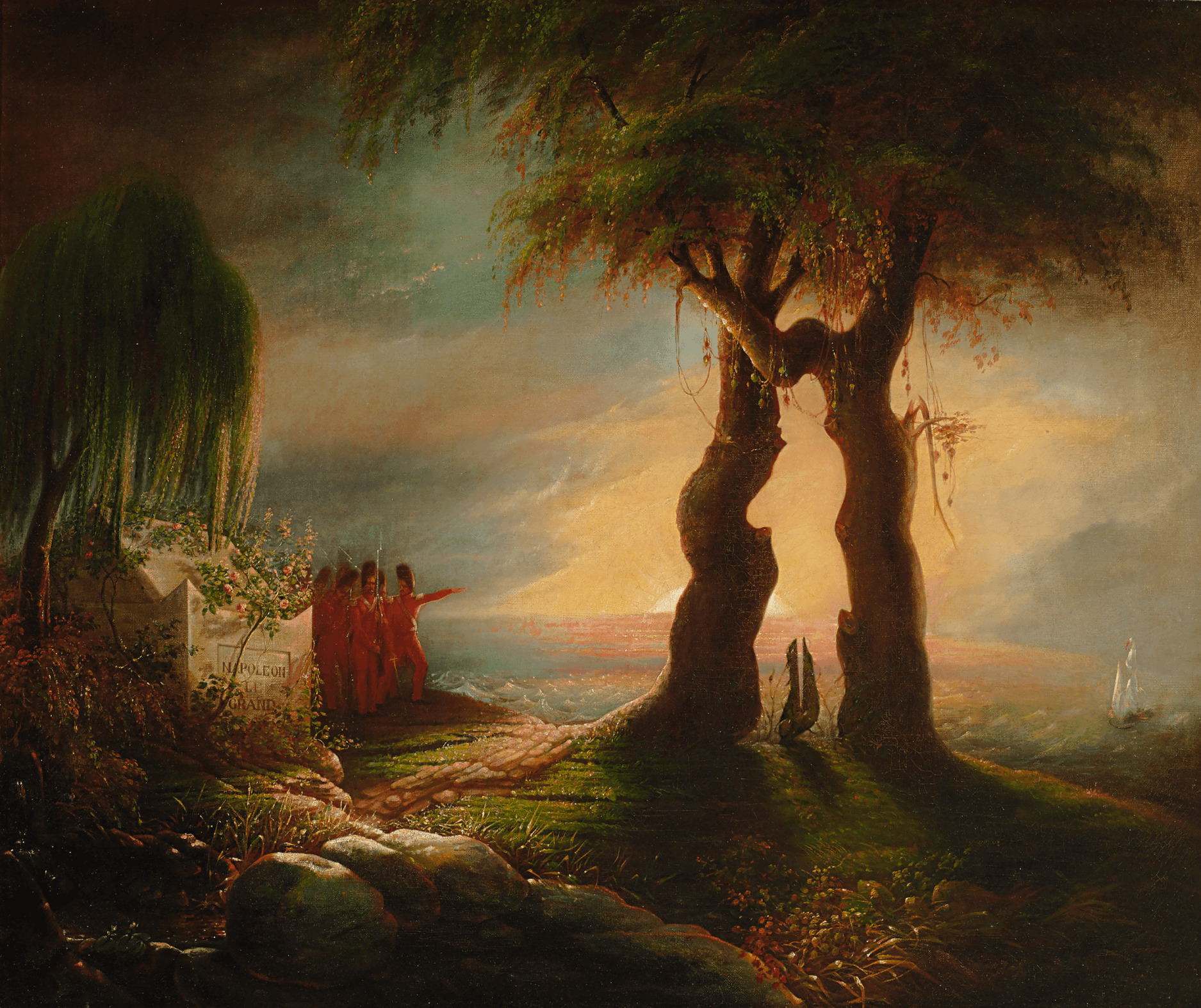
Napoleon's Tomb by Thomas Rossiter, c. 1860

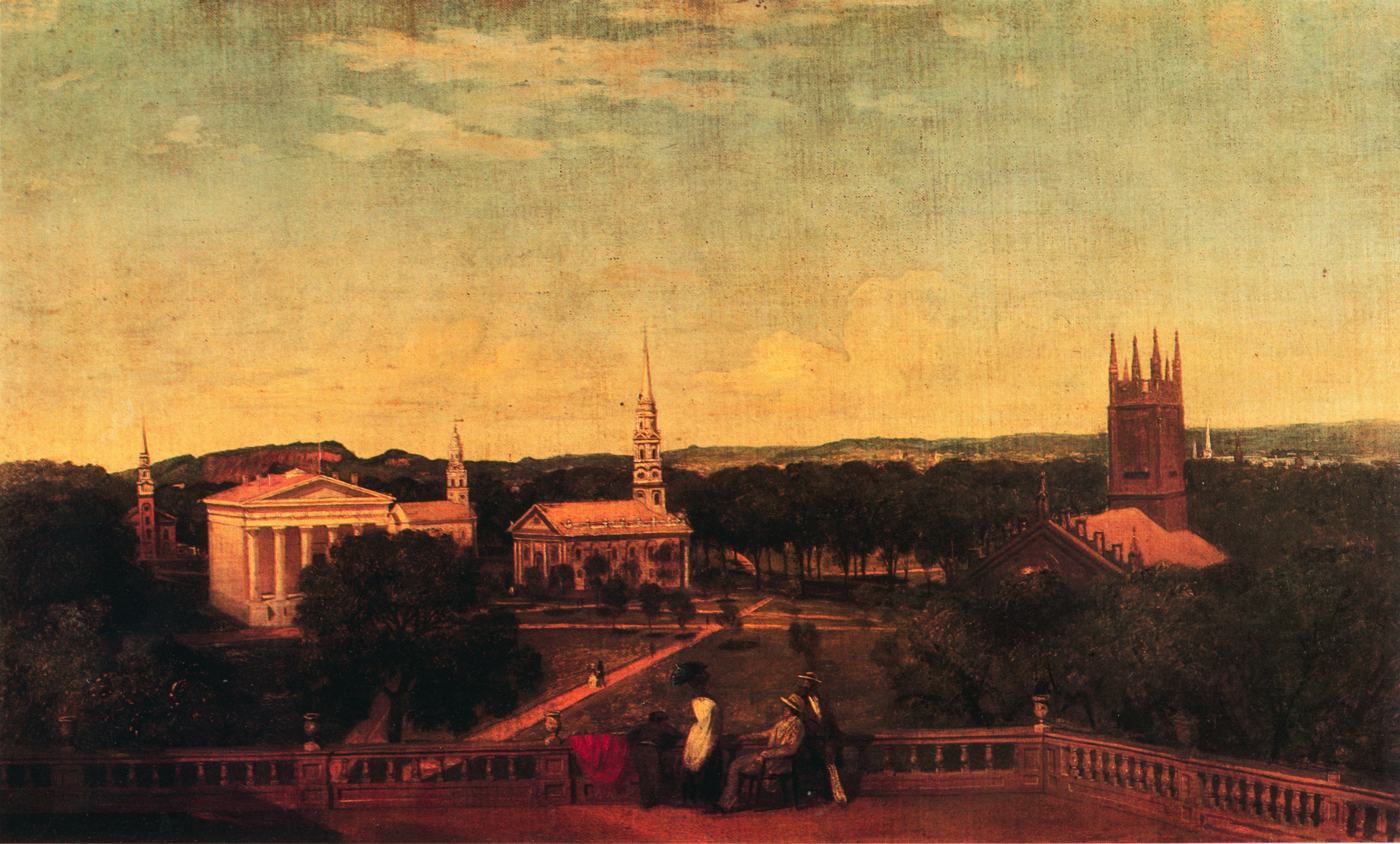
New Haven Green, by Rossiter, c.1850-1853

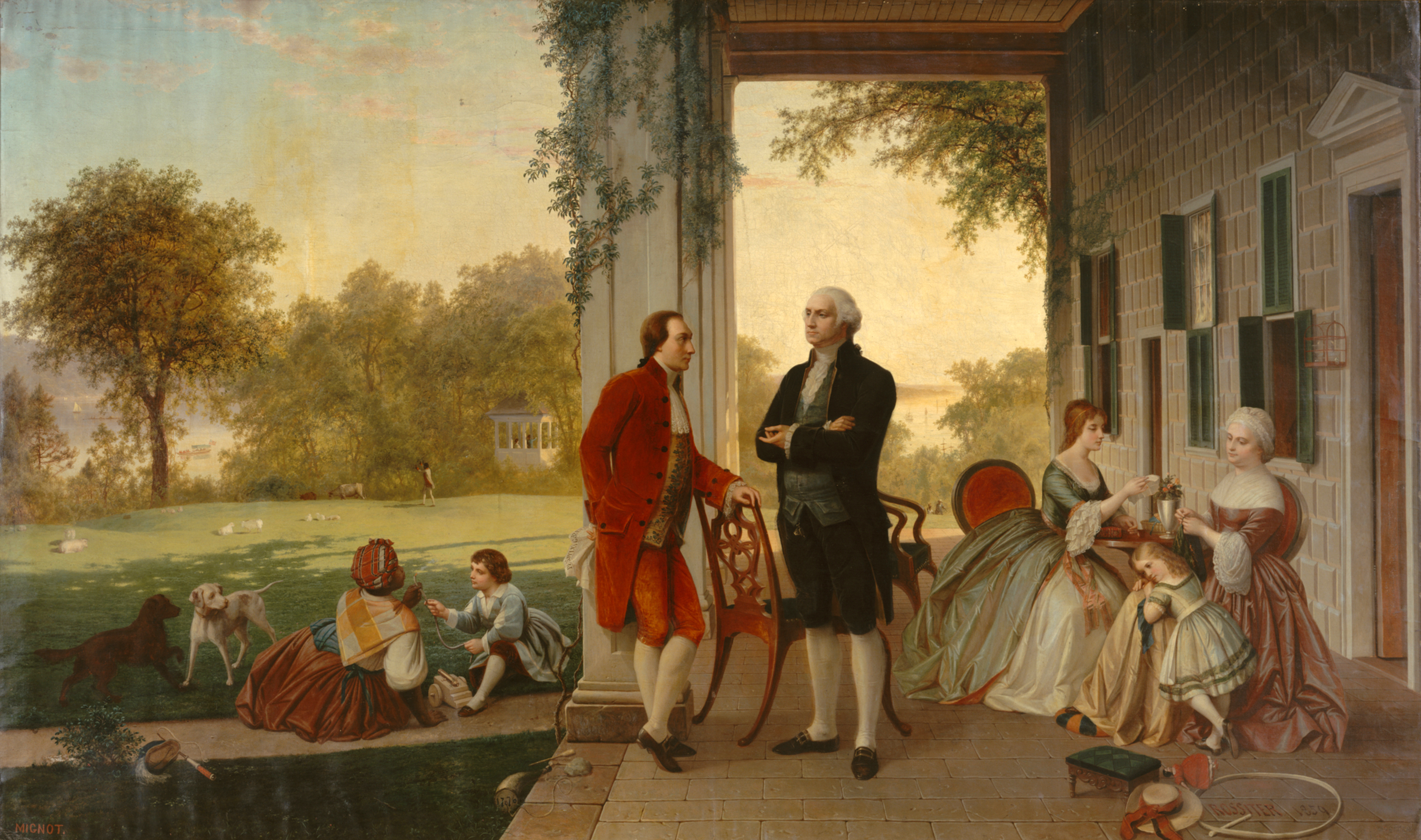
Washington and Lafayette at Mount Vernon, 1784 by Rossiter and Mignot, 1859

Rossiter was born in New Haven, Connecticut in 1818, where he later attended Hopkins School. He first studied painting with John Boyd, and later with Nathaniel Jocelyn.

In 1838, he exhibited two paintings at the National Academy of Design; the following year he moved to New York City and opened a studio. In 1840 he traveled in Europe with Asher B. Durand, John Kensett, and John William Casilear. While there, he visited Rome with Thomas Cole, and decided to stay in Italy. In 1846, he returned to New York City and shared a studio with Kensett and Louis Lang.

In 1849, Rossiter was elected to the National Academy. In 1851, he married Anna Ehrick Parmly. They toured Europe in 1853, settling in Paris where Anna gave birth to twins Ehrick Kensett and Charlotte. Rossiter kept a studio in Paris from 1853 to 1856, winning a gold medal at the Universal Exposition of 1855 for his Venice in the Fifteenth Century. Anna died shortly after the birth of their daughter Anna, and the family moved back to New York. For a brief period of time Rossiter had an art gallery, exhibiting his work and the work of his friends.

In 1857, he began several large compositions depicting scenes from early American history, including Washington and Lafayette at Mount Vernon, Washington and His First Cabinet, and George Washington and Family. As part of his research for the works, Rossiter visited Mount Vernon in June 1858, and soon afterward published an article on Washington's life and the state of his Mount Vernon estate. He wrote of his sadness to see the deteriorated state of the buildings and grounds, and urged the restoration of the mansion and furniture to the condition that Washington left them.

In 1860, Rossiter married Mary (Mollie) Sterling and moved his family to Cold Spring, New York on the Hudson River. He designed a house, Fair Lawn, overlooking the Hudson River. It is listed on the National Register of Historic Places. He continued to paint portraits, historical, and religious paintings, and exhibited at the National Academy of Design and the Pennsylvania Academy of the Fine Arts, until his death in 1871.

== Works ==
Among his best-known paintings are:

- Muses and Graces (1859), New Britain Museum of American Art
- Signing of the Constitution (ca 1860-1870), hosted at Independence National Historical Park
- Jews in Captivity
- The Wise and Foolish Virgins
- The Home of Washington (1858), painted together with Mignot.
- Washington's First Cabinet
- The Last Hours of Tasso
- Spilt Milk
