= Contentment Island =

Island in Tokeneke, Connecticut, USA

Coordinates: 41.057°N 73.455°W

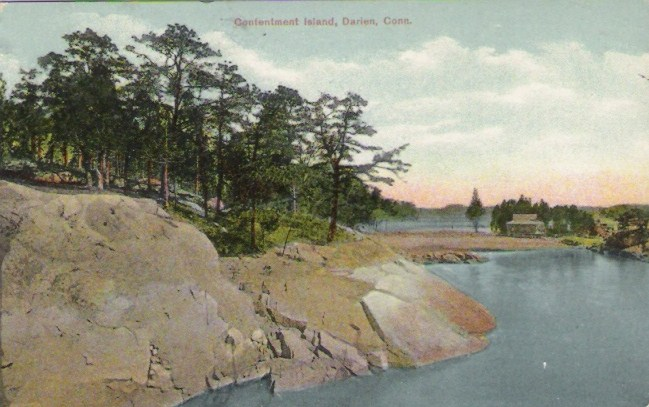
Postcard c. 1914, of Contentment Island. By the early 1870s Kensett was spending considerable time at his home on Contentment Island, on Long Island Sound.

Contentment Island is a small island in the Long Island Sound, off the coast of Tokeneke, Connecticut, United States. It is primarily residential, and is also home of the private Tokeneke Club. It contains some of the country's most expensive real estate; many homes sell for over $10M. The community serves as a weekend getaway for some of New York City's most elite businessmen. The island is accessible via either car or boat. It is off-limits to anyone not a resident of Tokeneke.

John Frederick Kensett, a famous painter and engraver, focused much of his artwork on his time spent living on the island in the late 1800s.

== See also ==
- Fisher Island, Florida
- Star Island, Florida
