= Luminism (American art style) =

American landscape painting style of the 1850s – 1870s

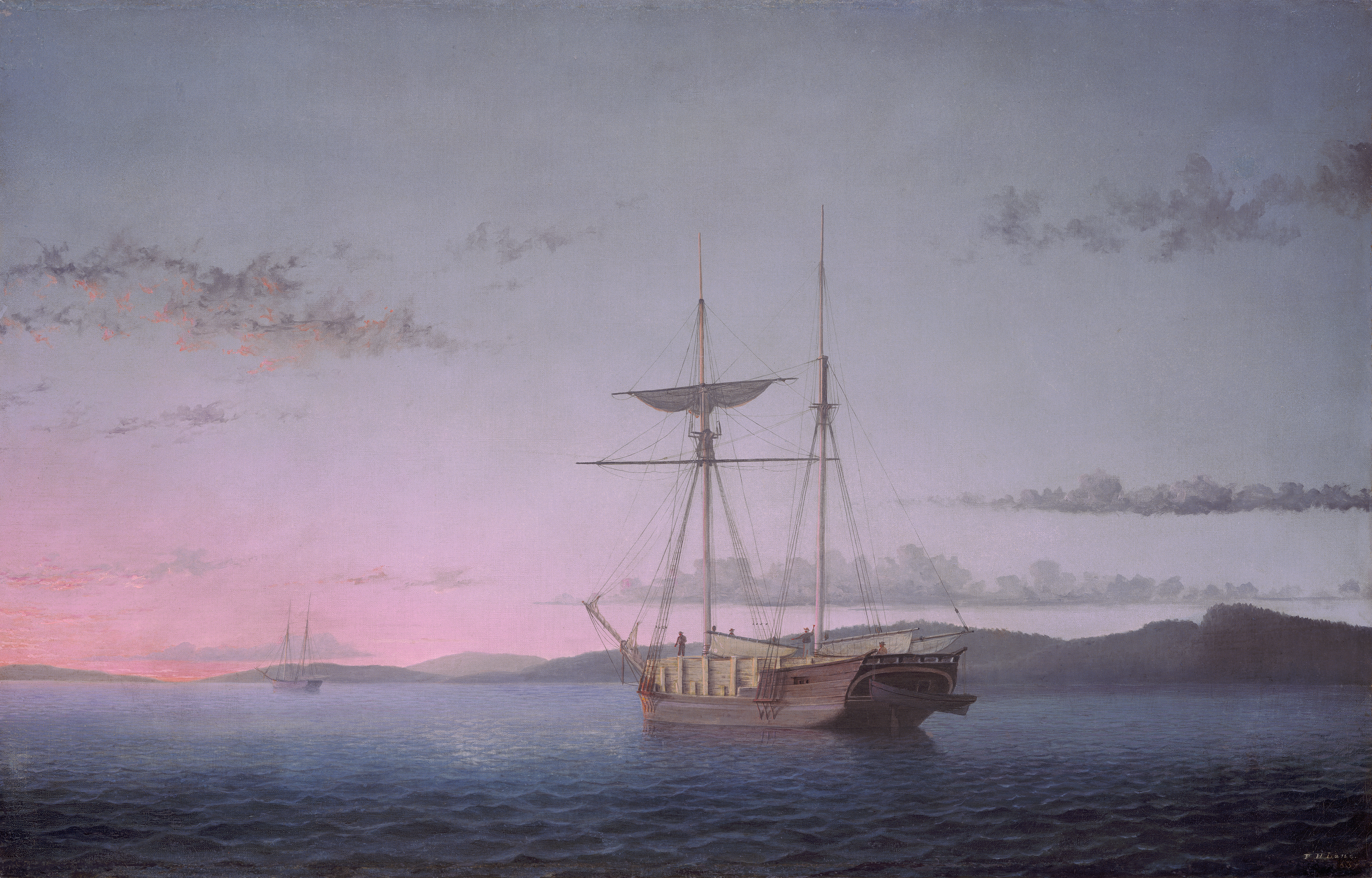
Fitz Henry Lane, Lumber Schooners at Evening on Penobscot Bay, 1863, National Gallery of Art

Luminism is a style of American landscape painting from the 1850s to 1870s, characterized by effects of light in a landscape, through the use of aerial perspective and the concealing of visible brushstrokes. Luminist landscapes emphasize tranquility, often depicting calm, reflective water and a soft, hazy sky. Artists most central to the development of the luminist style include Fitz Henry Lane, Martin Johnson Heade, Sanford Gifford, and John F. Kensett.

Painters with a less clear affiliation include Frederic Edwin Church, Jasper Cropsey, Albert Bierstadt, Worthington Whittredge, Raymond Dabb Yelland, Alfred Thompson Bricher, James Augustus Suydam, and David Johnson. Some precursor artists are George Harvey and Robert Salmon. Joseph Rusling Meeker also worked in the style.

== History ==
The term luminism was introduced by mid-20th-century art historians to describe a 19th-century American style of painting that developed as an offshoot of the Hudson River School. Historian John I. H. Baur identified the style in the late 1940s, calling it "luminism" in a 1954 article. The National Gallery of Art's landmark 1980 exhibition American Light: The Luminist Movement, 1825-1875 included many artists now primarily associated with the Hudson River School, such as Frederic Edwin Church.

As defined by art historian Barbara Novak, luminist art tends to stress the horizontal, and demonstrates the artist's close control of structure, tone, and light. The light is generally cool, hard, and non-diffuse; "soft, atmospheric, painterly light is not luminist light." Brushstrokes are concealed to minimize recognition that the painting is an artifact. Luminist paintings tend not to be large to suggest a sense of timeless intimacy. The picture surface or plane is emphasized, recalling primitivism. These qualities are present in different degrees depending on the artist’s work. Novak suggests that luminism is most closely associated with transcendentalism. The difficulty of precisely defining luminism has contributed to overuse of the term.

Luminism shares an emphasis on the effects of light with Impressionism. However, the two styles are markedly different. Luminism is characterized by attention to detail and the hiding of brushstrokes, while impressionism is characterized by lack of detail and an emphasis on brushstrokes. Luminism preceded impressionism, and the artists who painted in a luminist style were in no way influenced by Impressionism.

Luminism may also represent a contemplative perception of nature. According to Earl E. Powell, this is particularly visible in paintings by John Frederick Kensett, who shifted the visual concern for landscape to an interest in quietism, making pictures of mood that depict a poetic experience of nature. Furthermore, his painting Shrewsbury River “reduces nature to cryptographic essentials of composition . . . while rarified veils of light, color, and atmosphere reflected in water offer an experience of silence", a description akin to the sublime. Similarly, Martin Johnson Heade's painting Thunder Storm on Narragansett Bay represents the greatness of nature and the sublime arising from an intimate engagement with nature.

The artists who painted in this style did not refer to their own work as "luminism", nor did they articulate any common aesthetic philosophy beyond the principles of the Hudson River School. Many art historians find the term "luminism" problematic. J. Gray Sweeney argues that "the origins of luminism as an art-historical term were deeply entwined with the interests of elite collectors, prominent art dealers, influential curators, art historians, and constructions of national identity during the Cold War." Alan Wallach has called for a wholesale rethinking of "luminism" as a historical phenomenon.

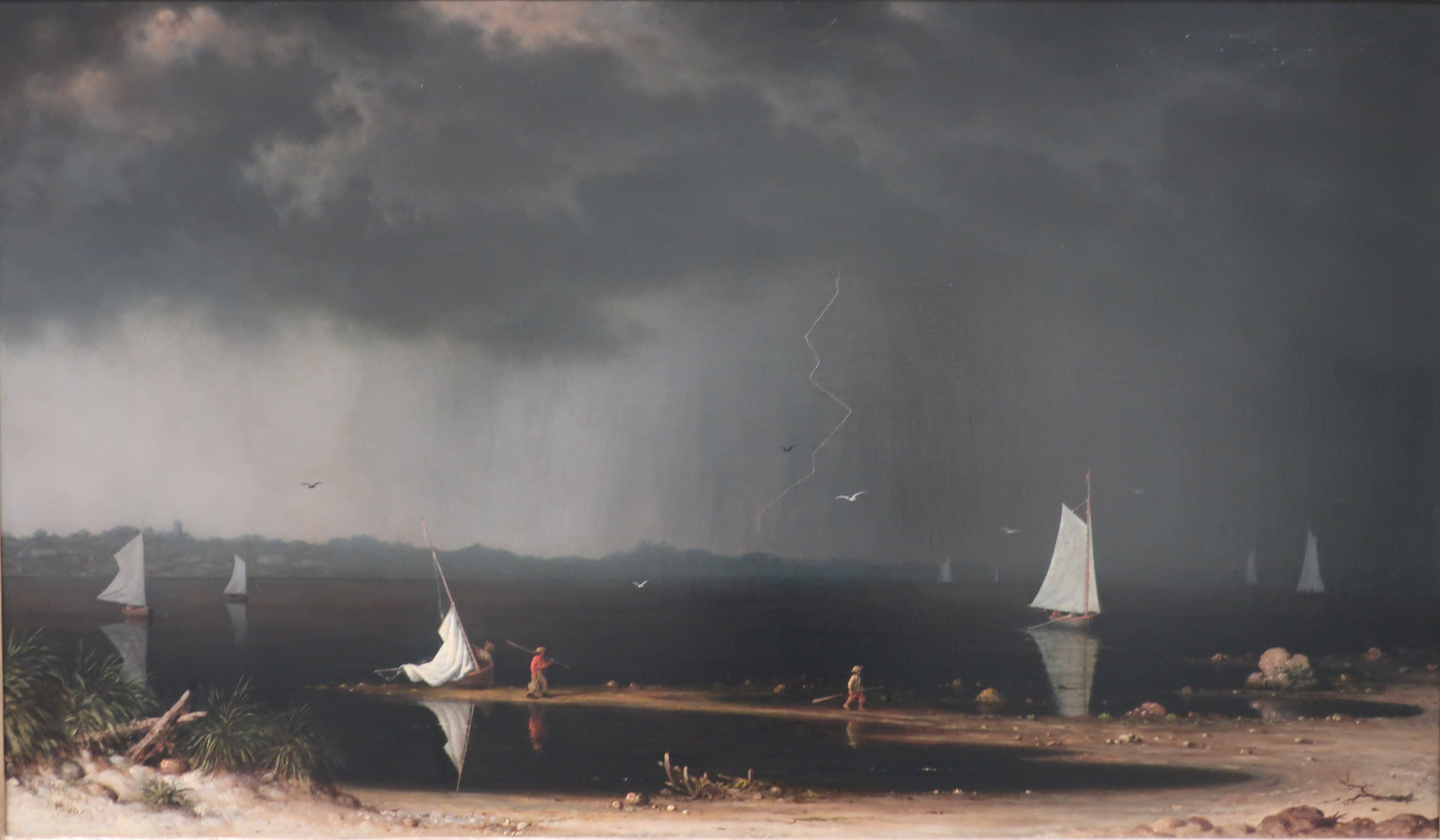
Martin Johnson Heade, Thunder Storm on Narragansett Bay, 1868

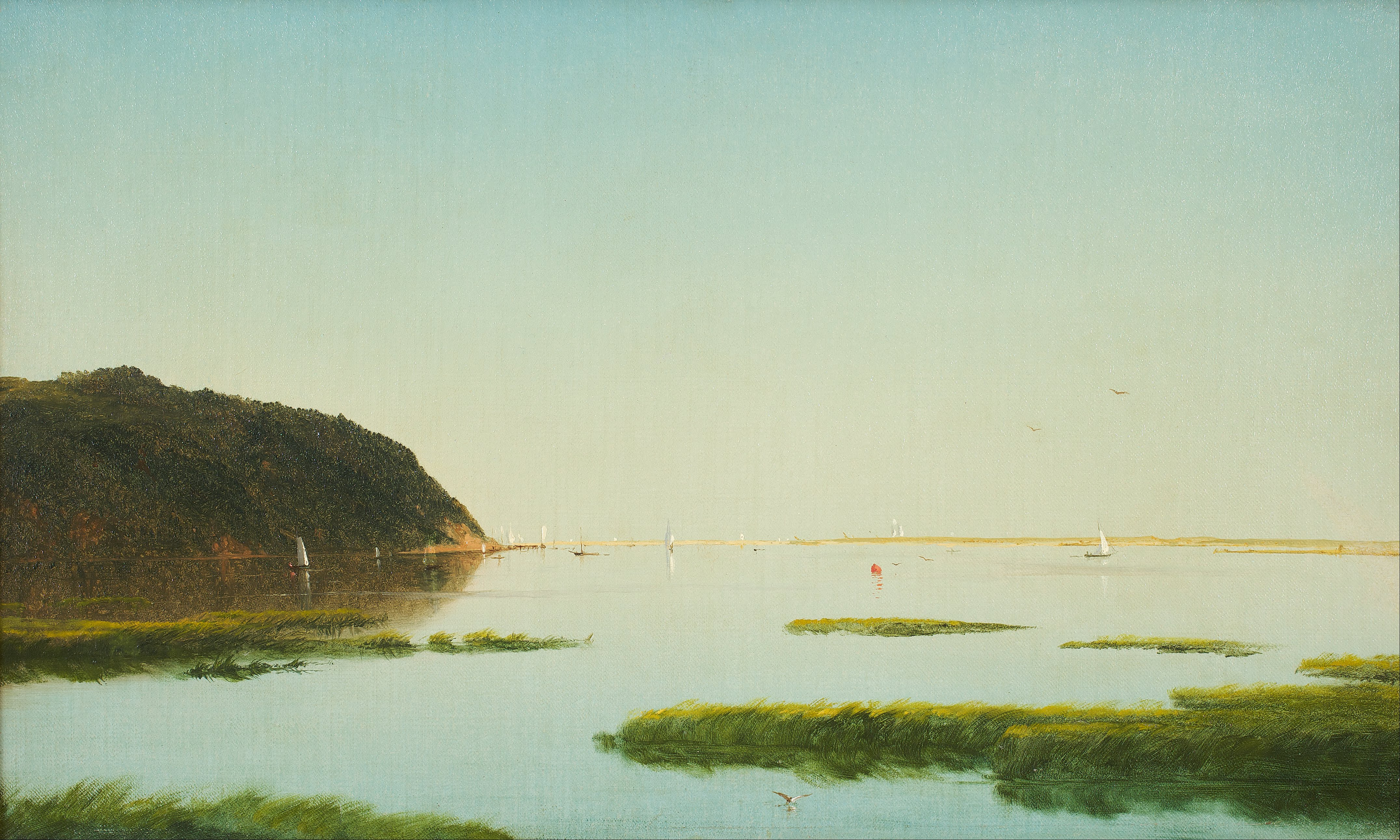
View of the Shrewsbury River, an 1859 luminist painting by John Frederick Kensett

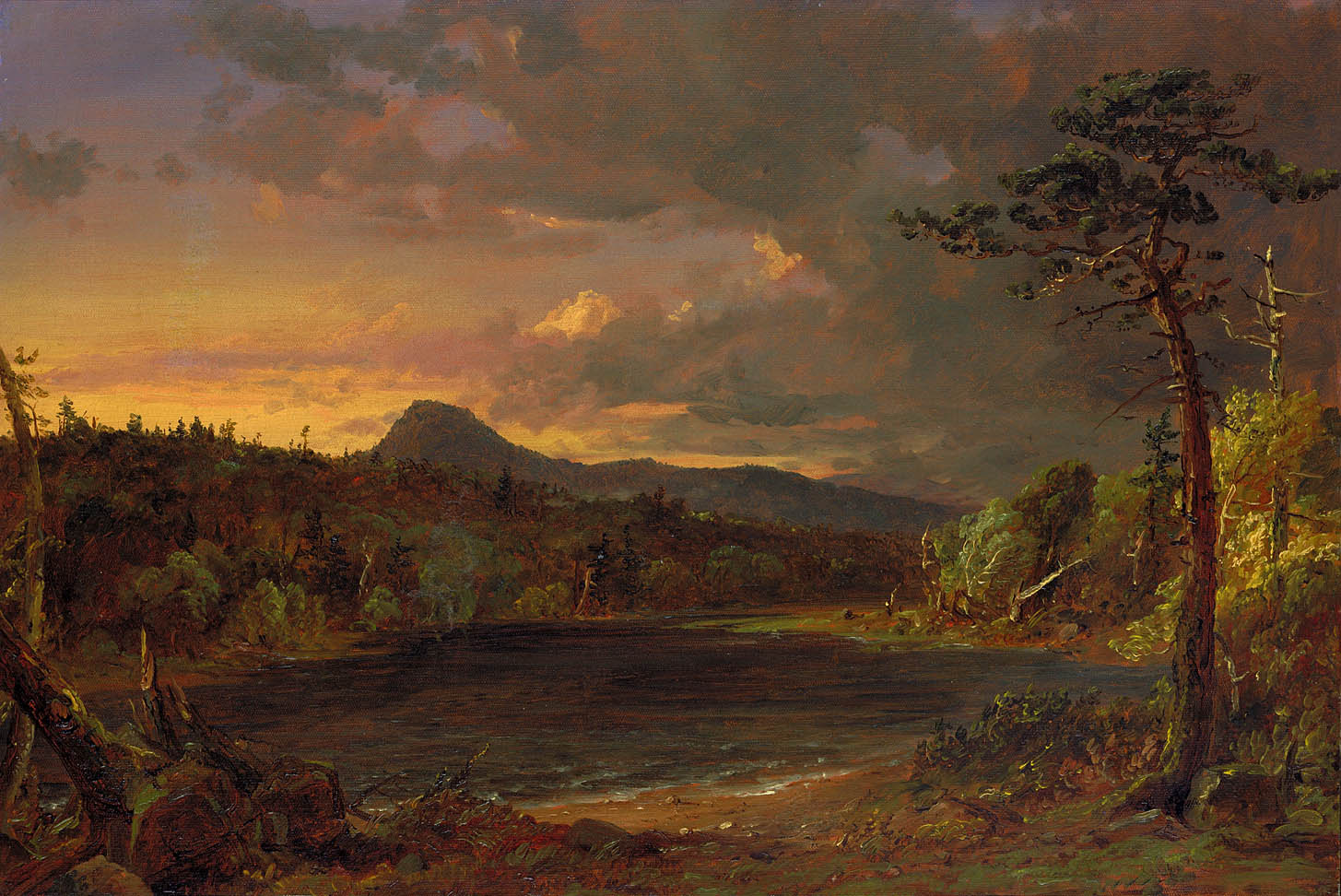
Jasper Francis Cropsey: Catskill Creek, 1850

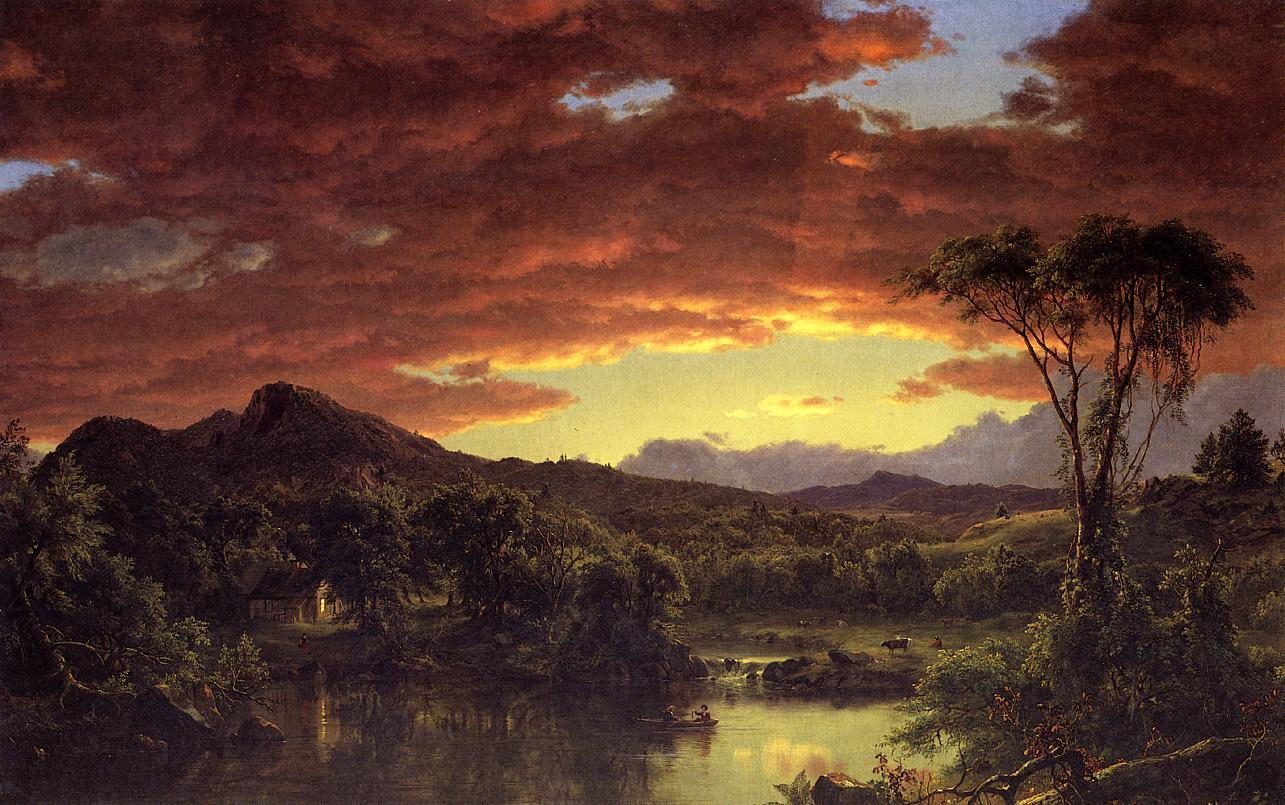
Frederic Edwin Church: A Country Home, 1854

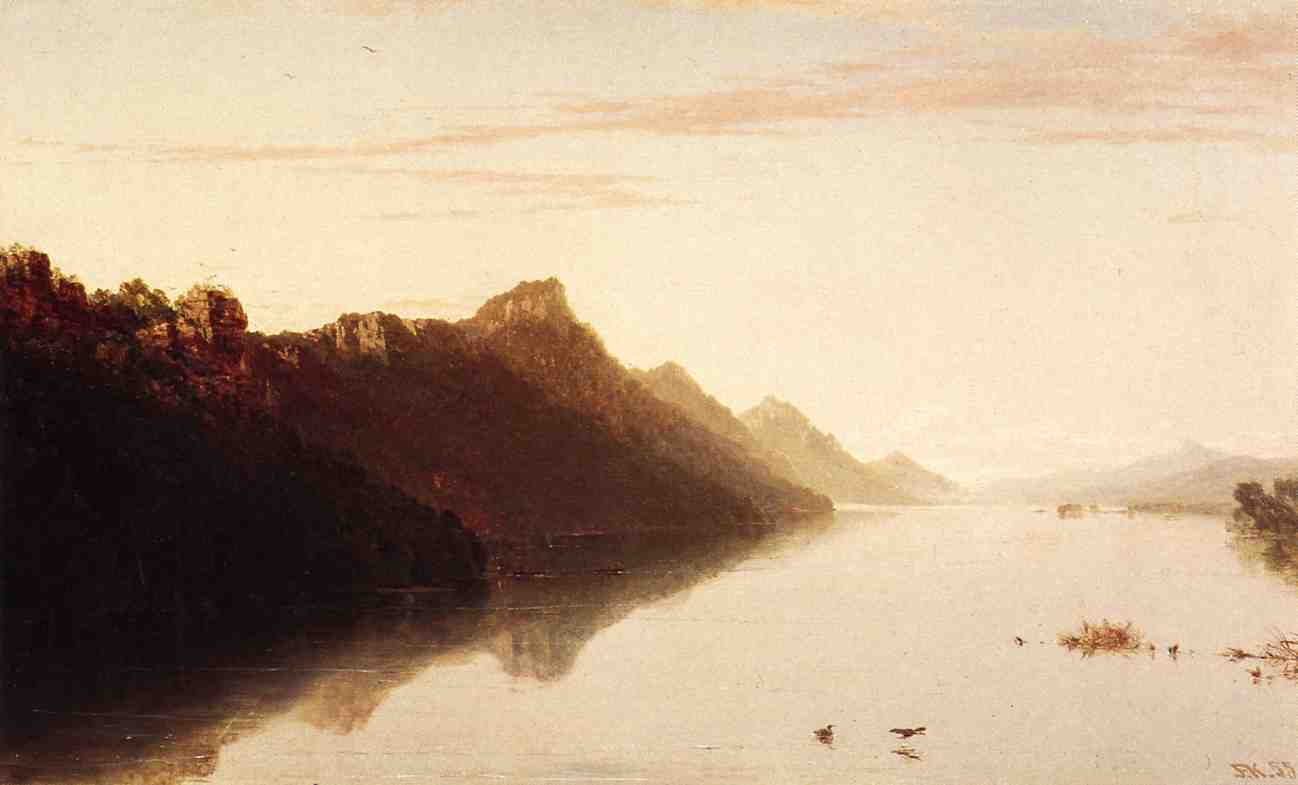
John Frederick Kensett: Upper Mississippi, 1855

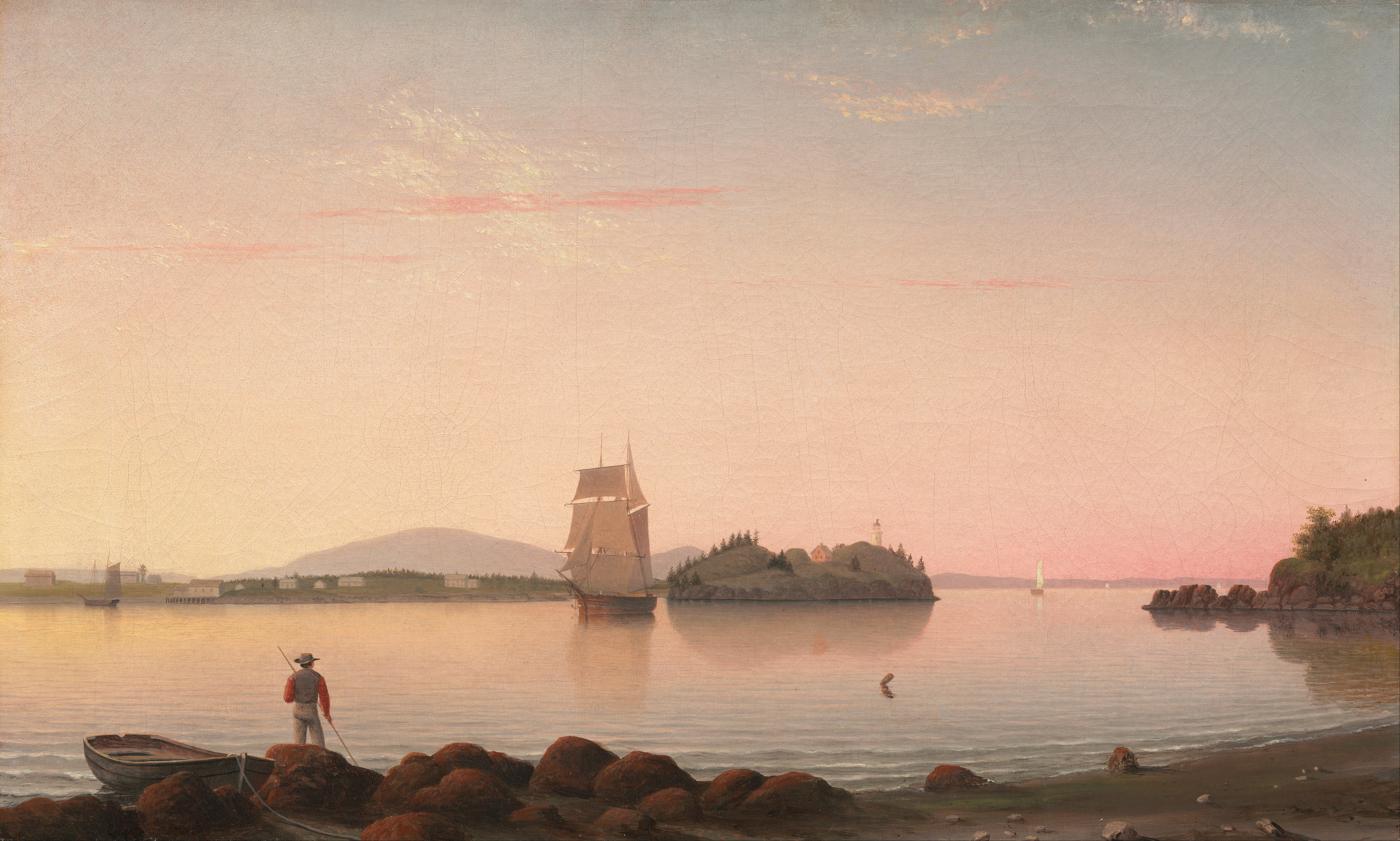
Fitz Hugh Lane: Owl’s Head, Penobscot Bay, Maine, 1862

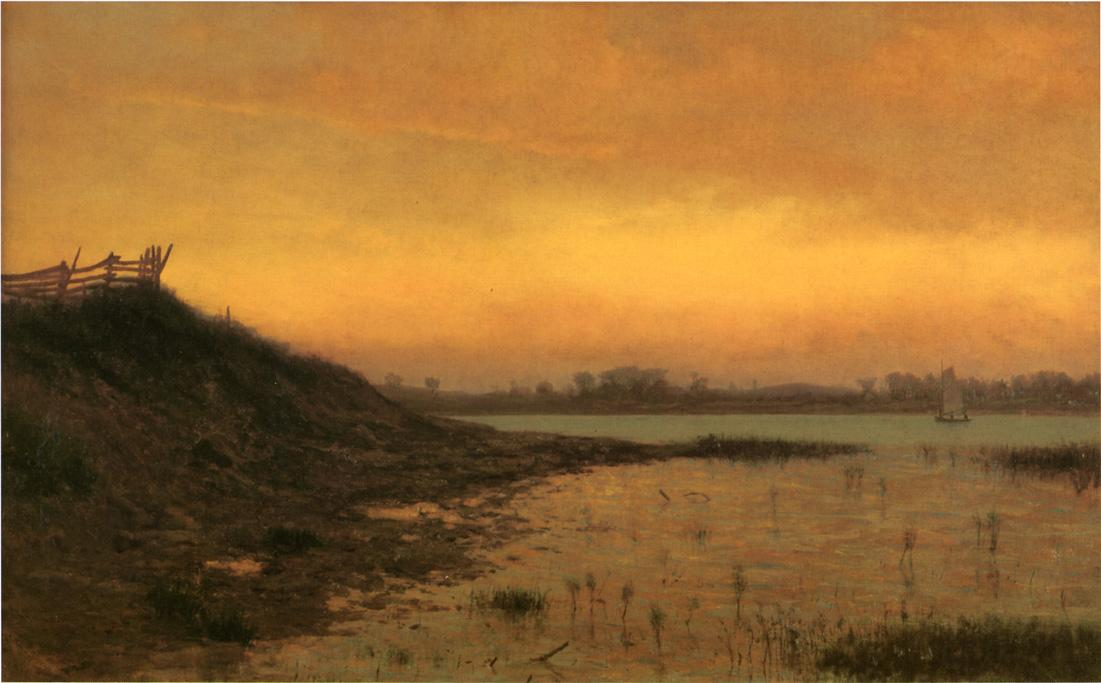
James Augustus Suydam: Long Island, 1862

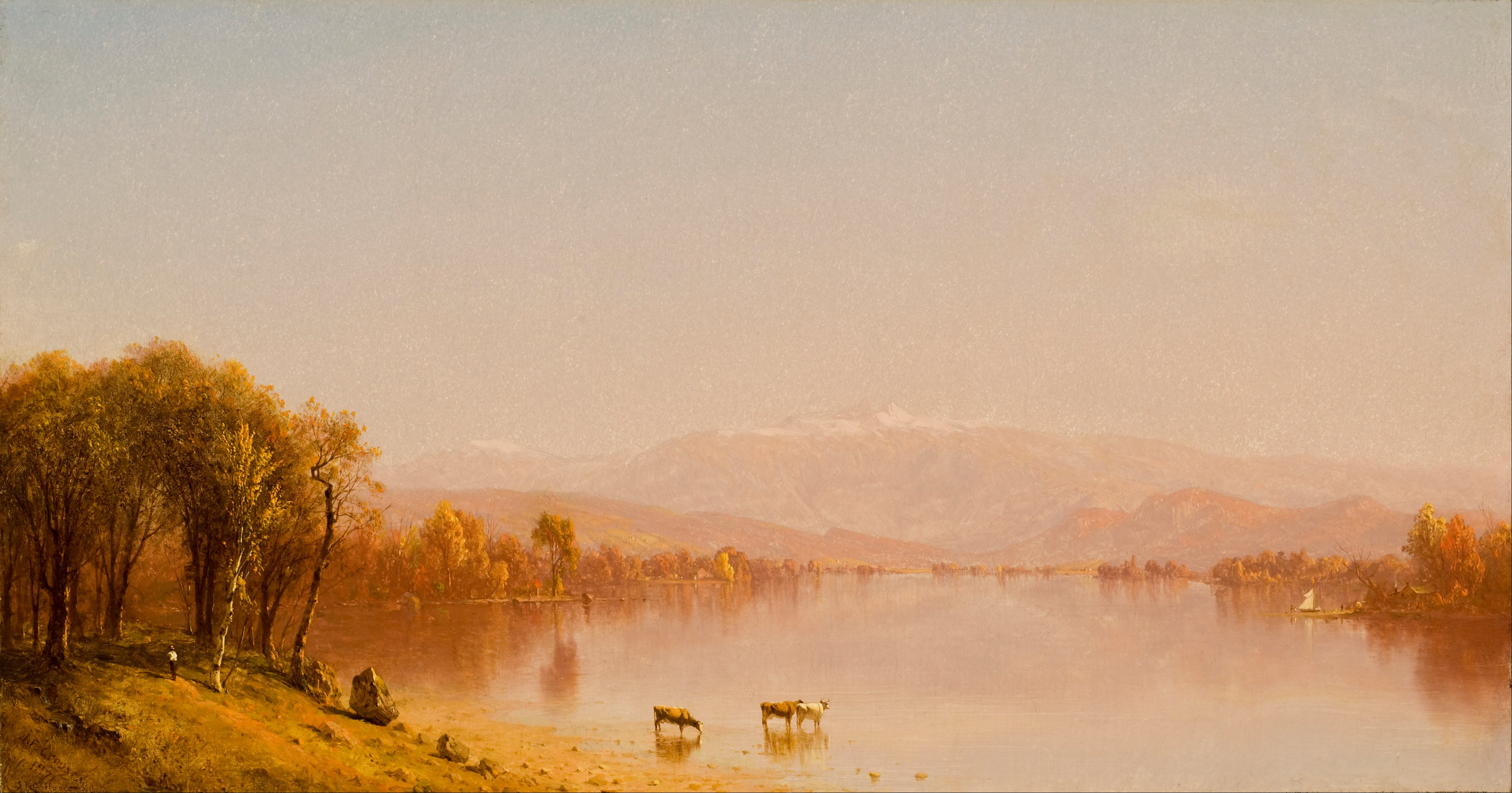
Sanford Robinson Gifford: Indian Summer in the White Mountains, 1862

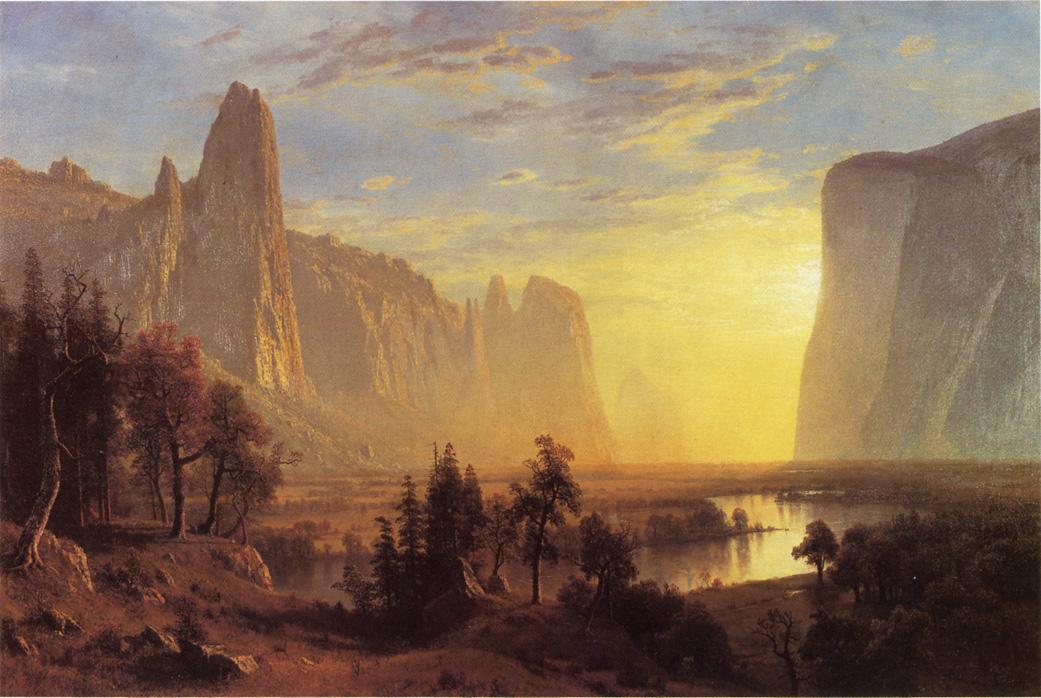
Albert Bierstadt: Yosemite Valley, Yellowstone Park, 1868

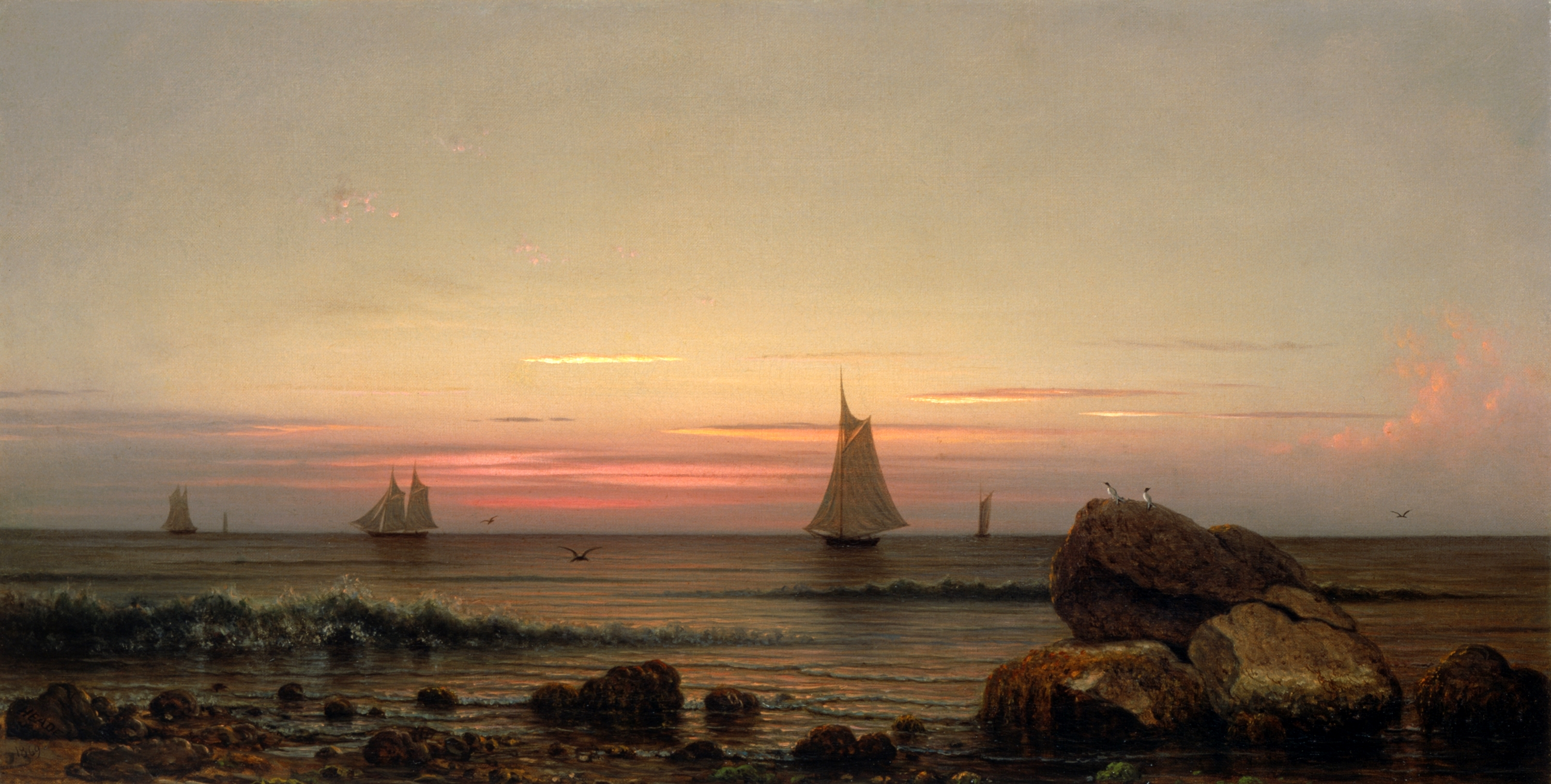
Martin Johnson Heade: Sailing off the Coast, 1869

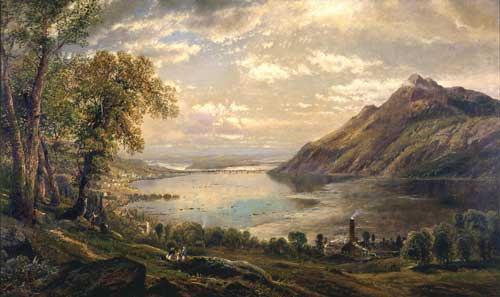
Edmund Darch Lewis: The Susquehanna at Duncannon, 1872

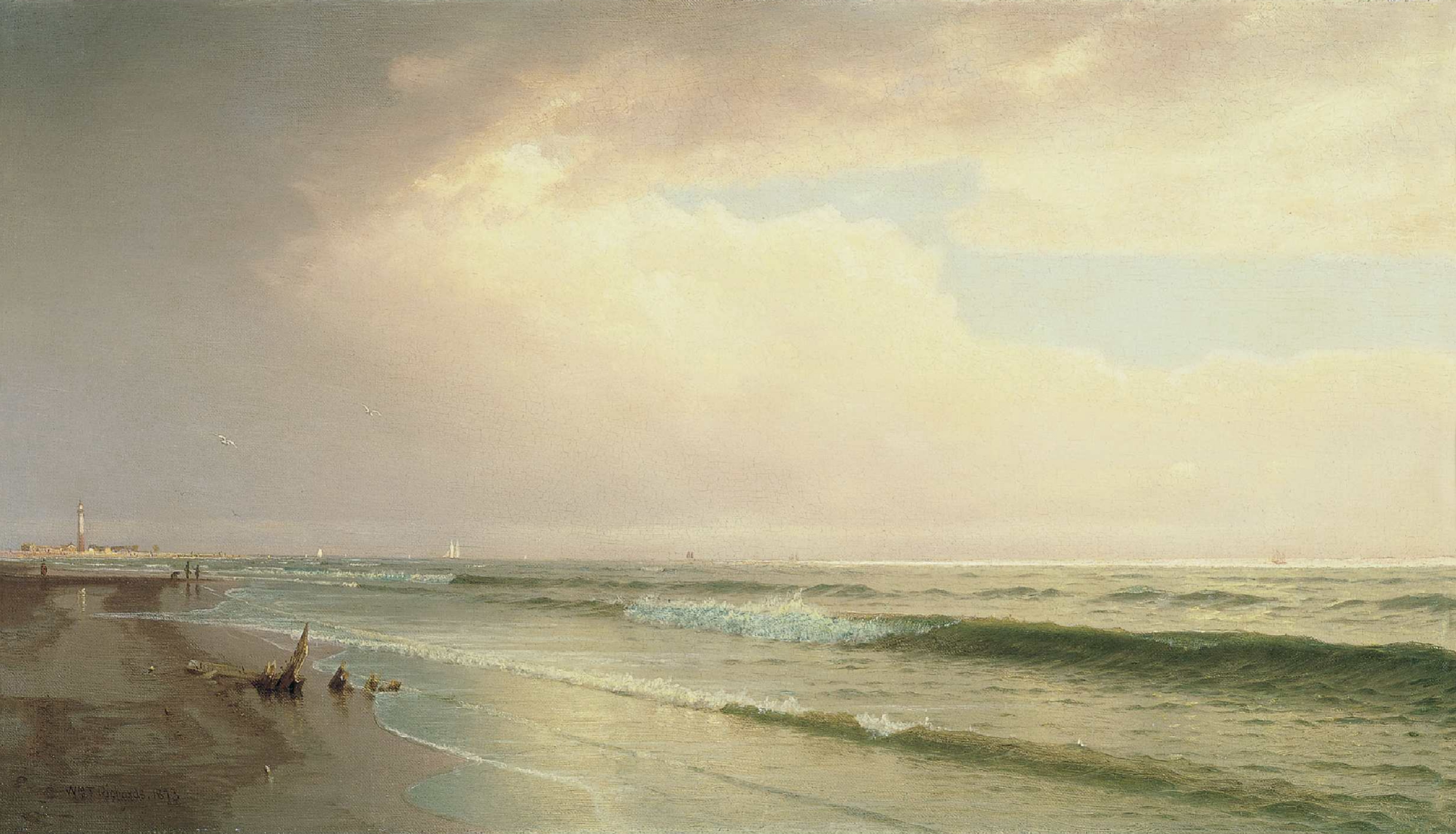
William Trost Richards: Seascape with Distant Lighthouse, 1873

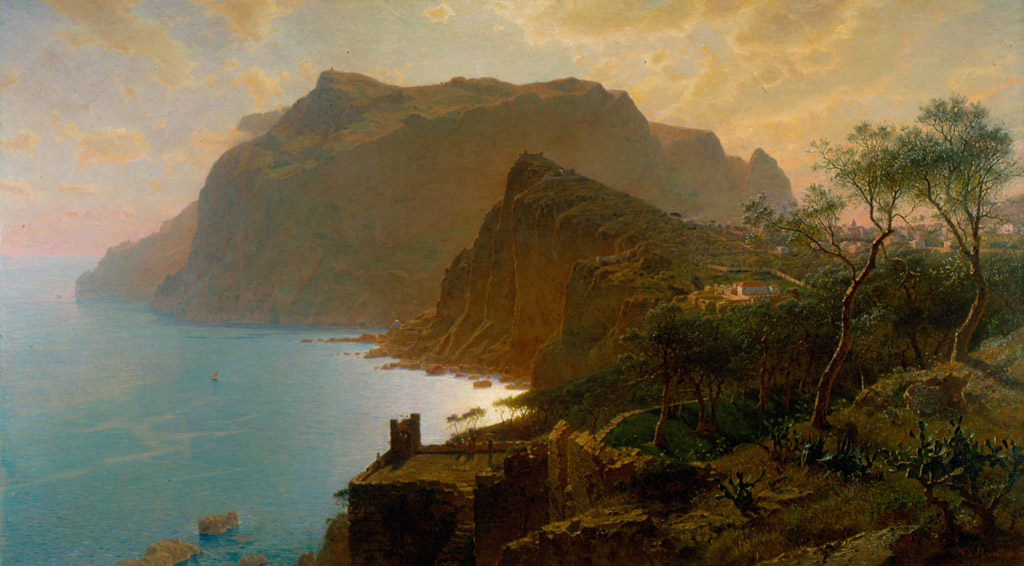
William Stanley Haseltine: The Sea from Capri, 1875

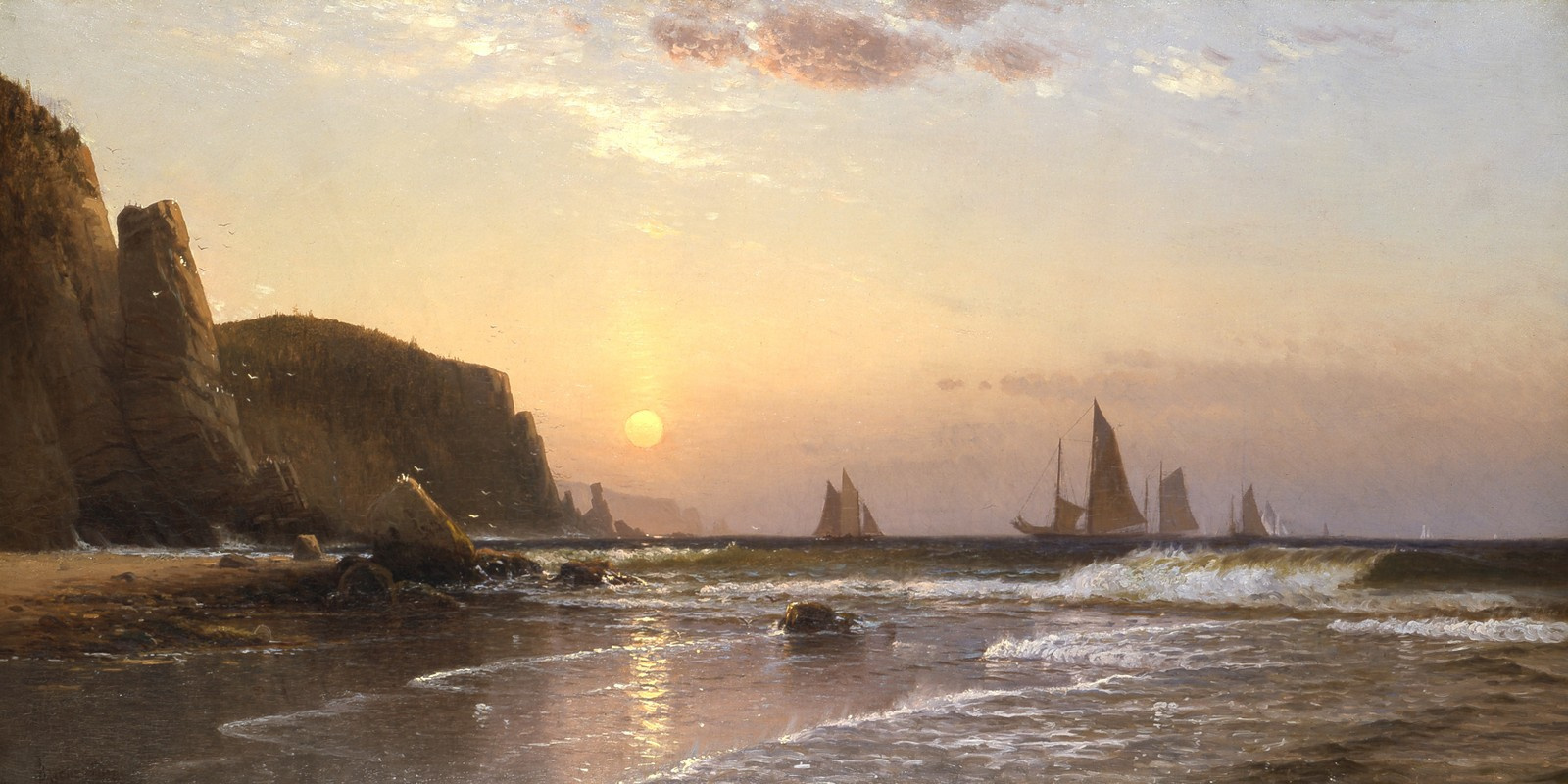
Alfred Thompson Bricher: Morning at Grand Manan, 1878

== Contemporary luminism ==
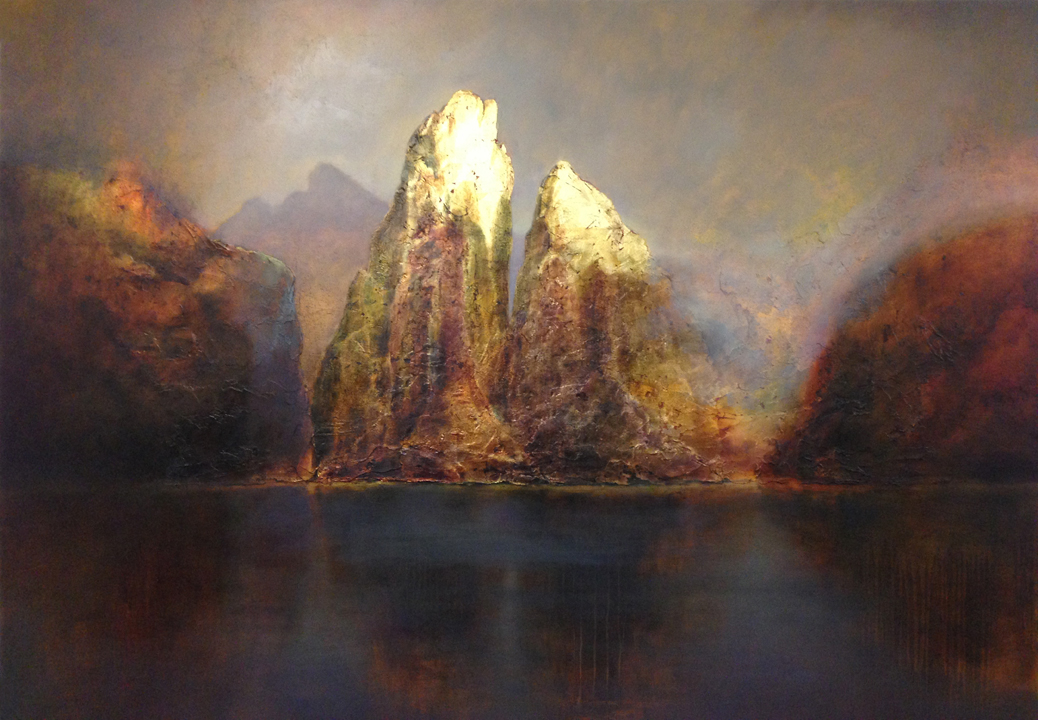
Communion, oil and metal leaf on panel, by Steven DaLuz (2017?)

Characteristics of luminism—majestic skies, calm waters, rarefied light, and magnificent landscapes—also appear in contemporary American paintings from artists like James Doolin, April Gornik and Steven DaLuz. The influence of luminism can be seen in the works of several American experimental filmmakers including James Benning and Sharon Lockhart, particularly in Benning's Ten Skies (2004) and Lockhart's Double Tide (2009).
