= Steven DaLuz =

American painter

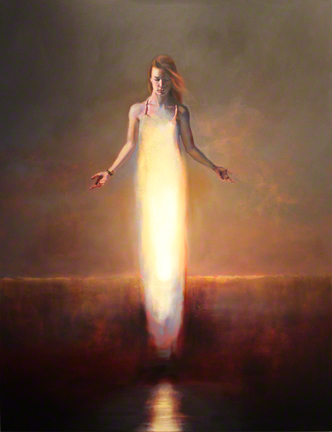
- Becoming, oil and metal leaf on panel
- Born: 1953 (age 72–73); Hanford, California
- Movement: Neoluminist

Steven DaLuz (born 1953) is a contemporary American Neoluminist artist known for using chemically induced patinas on metal leaf and mixed media to produce figurative works and imagined landscapes often reflecting upon the sublime as a pictorial theme. Emerging from a life shaped by movement, service, and devotion to art, his work has been published in established art periodical sources and art books. His art is said to combine figurative realism, abstracted environments, and imaginative realism, unified by an enduring exploration of radiant light. His profile is listed in the directory of artists of the municipal government of San Antonio, Texas.

== Biography ==
DaLuz was born in Hanford, California. He earned a degree in painting from the University of Texas at San Antonio in 2003 after spending over 24 years in the U.S. Air Force, retiring as a major. He began his art career painting human representations of otherworldly beings, some of them even showing billowing angel wings. In his mature life he has suffered several life-threatening health episodes valued by the artist as intimate conversations with death. Growing up in a military family and moving often across different geographies raised his atmospheric sensibility, which later influenced his art.

== Education ==
DaLuz holds degrees in Social Psychology (BA, Park University, 1979), Management (MA, Central Michigan University, 1981), Graphic Design (AA), San Antonio College, 2001), and Fine Arts (BFA, University of Texas at San Antonio, 2003).

== Career ==
DaLuz is known for figurative works and imagined landscapes, using both encaustic and a process he devised with metal leaf, oil, and mixed media. A common feature throughout his artwork is the sense of mystery and otherworldly light, which he strives to achieve through the use of chemically induced patinas on metal leaf and other combinations of mixed media. He confesses to a deep love of the liminal sublime, the experience of the small self in the face of supreme and universal forces. His achievements include the exhibition of his works in many galleries and museums across the US and abroad, his wins of art awards, and the inclusion of his work in several art reference books, including the series Strokes of Genius and the manual Encaustic Art, by Jennifer Margell. DaLuz's work was lauded by PleinAir, an art magazine focused on landscape paintings by artists using plein air techniques. In 2009, he was given the cover of Poets and Artists Magazine. Alongside pieces from artists from all over the world, works by Daluz were included in the Lunar Codex collection sent to the Moon in 2024 via NASA's Artemis program. He has been an active art curator, and is affiliated with the Veterans Art Institute.

== Exhibitions ==
- 2007 Dance (Solo), AnArte Gallery, San Antonio, Texas
- 2008 Works by Steven DaLuz, Museum of Contemporary Art, Skopje, Macedonia
- 2011 Watchers, (Solo), AnArte Gallery, San Antonio, TX
- 2013 New Works (Solo), AnArte Gallery, San Antonio, TX
- 2014 Selfie, AnArte Gallery, San Antonio, Texas
- 2016 Mystica (Solo), AnArte Gallery, San Antonio, TX
- 2018 Communion (Solo), AnArte Gallery, San Antonio, TX
- 2021 Between Worlds (Solo), AnArte Gallery, San Antonio, TX
- 2022 One World Gallery Suchi, Tokyo, Japan

A more complete list of DaLuz's shows, such as Milestones (2005), Imaginary Places (2006), Passages (2008), Geomorphosis (2008), Dance 2 (2009), Cataclysm & Creativity (2009), Emanations (2010), Paintings and Pirouettes (2011), Glimpse (2012), New Works (2013), Figments of the Sublime (2015), Communion (2018), and others, may be found in his CV.

== Awards ==
- 2009 Selection for the Florence Biennale
- 2015 Finalist, Hunting Art Prize
- 2018 FASO BoldBrush, Best of Show
- 2024 PleinAir Magazine, Best Artist over 65
- 2025 The Almenara Art Prize -Religious and Spiritual Category— for Voyager.

== Press ==
=== Articles ===
- American Art Collector: The Art of the Nude
- Artist Spotlight
- Lunar Codex inclusion

=== Interviews ===
- Steven DaLuz, Artist
- Between Worlds
- Artist Interview with Steven DaLuz 2013
- An interview with Steven DaLuz
- The Drawing Source interview

== Critique ==
- Michael Pearce: "rich and colorful patinas created with gloved hands to combine alchemical transmutations with controlled accidents of abstraction"
- Christopher Volpe: "a unique process applying metal leaf and chemically induced oils in dramatically lit in abstractions, figurative paintings, and imaginary land or sky scapes"

== Gallery ==
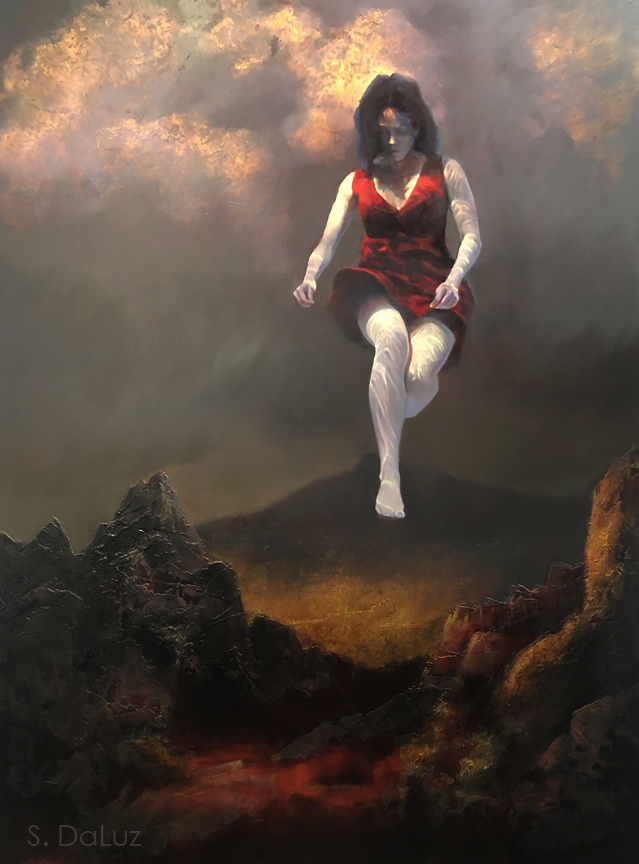
Between Worlds

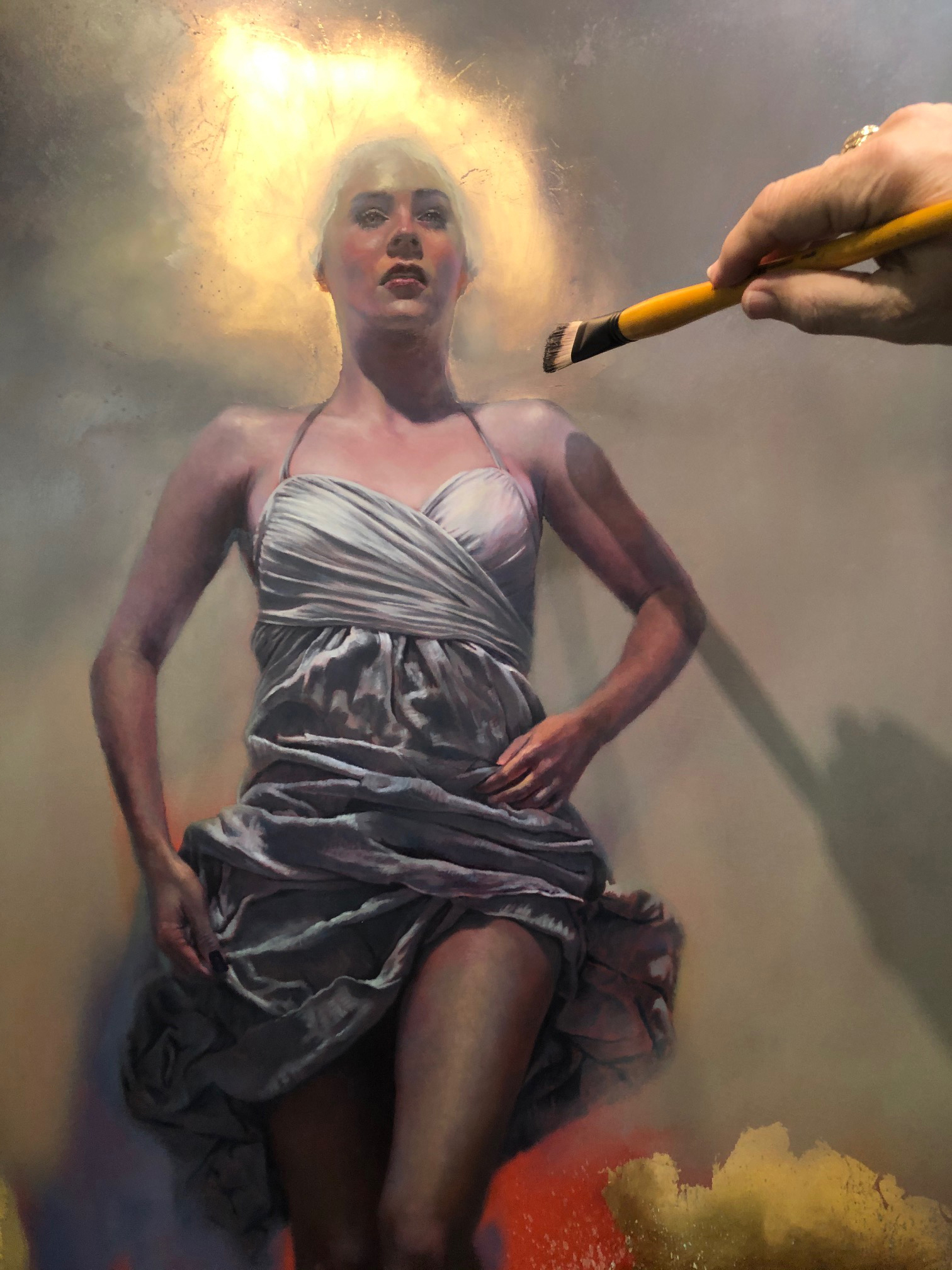
Resolve (Work in Progress-Fragment)
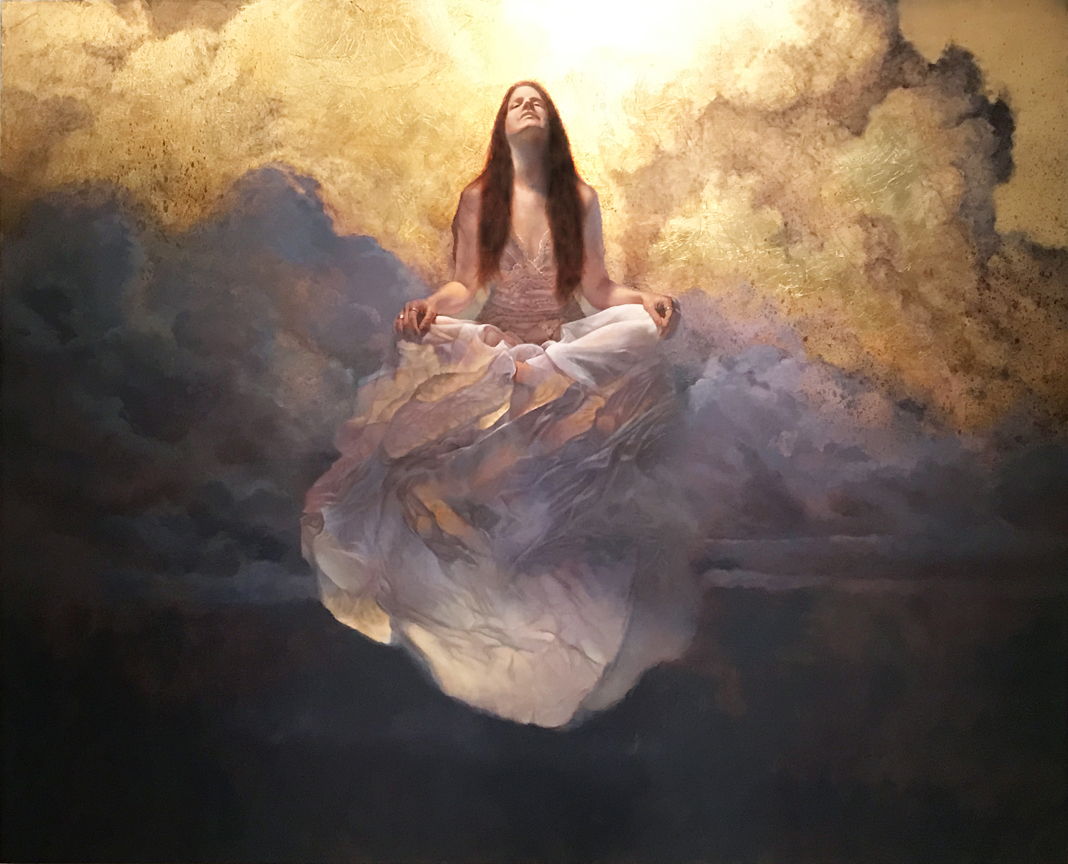
Voyager
