= John William Casilear =

American painter (1811–1893)

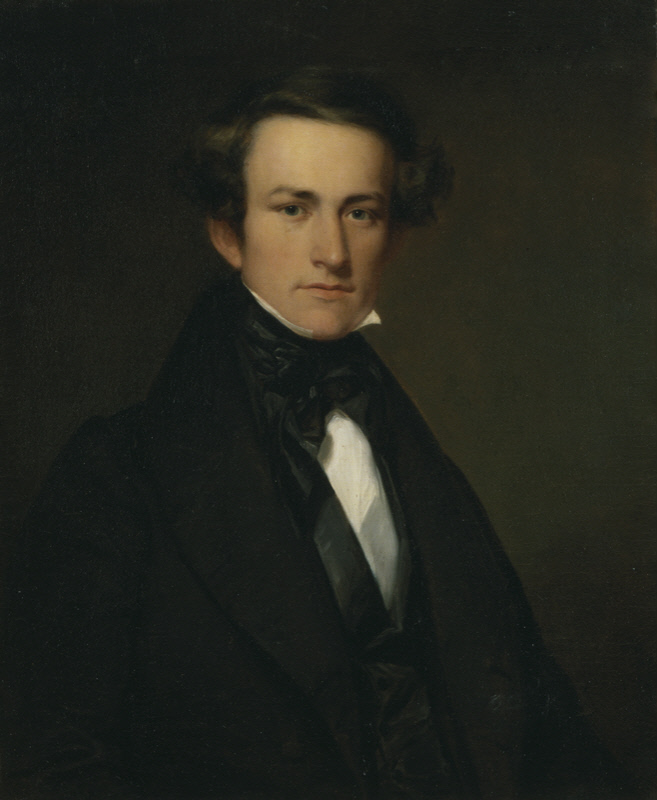
- Portrait of Casilear by Asher B. Durand, c. 1840
- Born: June 25, 1811; New York City, New York, United States
- Died: August 17, 1893 (aged 82); Saratoga Springs, New York, United States
- Education: Asher Durand
- Known for: Landscape painting

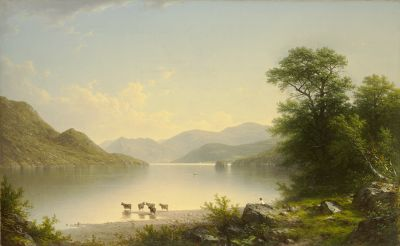
Lake George, 1860

John William Casilear (June 25, 1811 – August 17, 1893) was an American landscape artist belonging to the Hudson River School.

== Biography ==
Casilear was born in New York City. His first professional training was under prominent New York engraver Peter Maverick in the 1820s, then with Asher Durand, himself an engraver at the time. Casilear and Durand became friends, and both worked as engravers in New York through the 1830s.

By the middle 1830s Durand had become interested in landscape painting through his friendship with Thomas Cole. Durand, in turn, drew Casilear's attention to painting. By 1840, Casilear's interest in art was sufficiently strong to accompany Durand, John Frederick Kensett, and artist Thomas Prichard Rossiter on a European trip during which they sketched scenes, visited art museums, and fostered their interest in painting.

Casilear gradually developed his talent in landscape art, painting in the style that was later to become known as the Hudson River School. By the middle 1850s he had entirely ceased his engraving career in favor of painting full-time. He was elected a full member of the National Academy of Design in 1851, having been an associate member since 1833, and exhibited his works there for over fifty years.

In 1867 Casilear married Helen M. Howard in the town of Tamworth, New Hampshire. They had one son, John William Casilear Jr. (1867–1939). Casilear died in Saratoga Springs, New York in 1893. Today examples of his art are in the collections of the Metropolitan Museum of Art, New York, the National Gallery of Art, Washington DC, and Ringwood Manor, Ringwood, NJ. And the Woodmere Art Museum, Philadelphia, PA.
