= Thomas Kensett =

Thomas Kensett (1786-1829)
- Born: 1786; St. Mary, Hampton, Middlesex, Richmond upon Thames
- Died: 16 June 1829 Age 42; New Haven, Connecticut, USA
- Other names: James Isaac Thomas Kensett
- Occupations: Engraver, Inventor
- Known for: US Patent for the Tin Can, 1812 Map of Upper and Lower Canada, Early Masonic Aprons

Thomas Kensett, was an early American engraver who published a key map of the area of conflict during the opening stages of the War of 1812. He later entered into a partnership with his father-in-law to patent and produce the first tin cans in America.

== Early years ==
Born and baptized James Isaac Thomas Kensett to Thomas & Sarah Kensett in St Mary's Parish Church, Hampton, Middlesex, Richmond upon Thames on 16 August 1786. He immigrated to the United States and was in New Haven, Connecticut by 1806. During this time he set up shop as an engraver and married Elizabeth Daggett on 9 May 1813. Kensett was listed on a return to the State Department as an alien enemy sometime between 1812 and 1814, suggesting that he had not yet obtained US citizenship.

== Engraving and New Haven ==
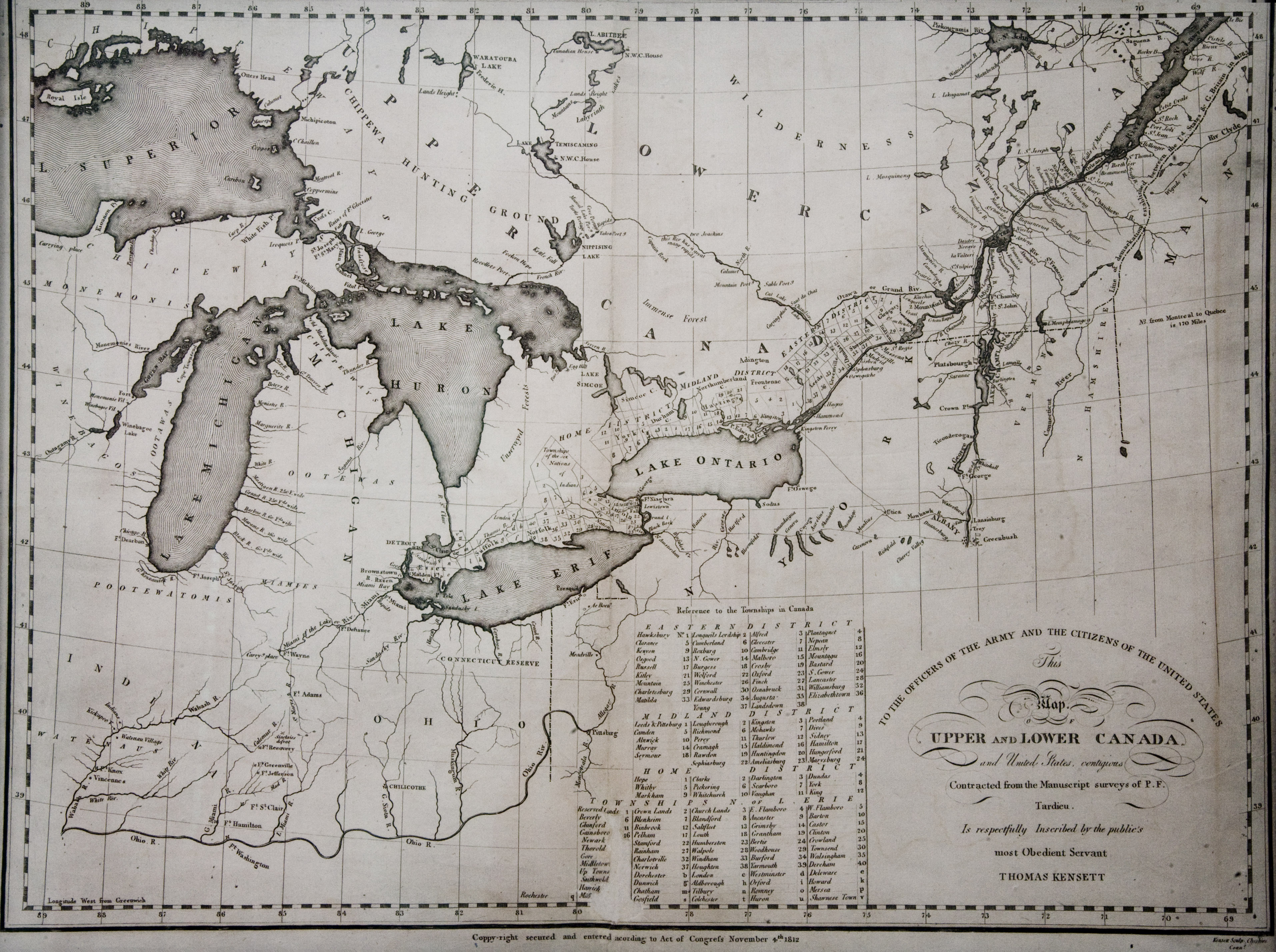
Kensett's engraving of Upper & Lower Canada 1812

He began his career in England as an engraver at Hampton Court. His earliest engraved map in America was a plan of the town of New Haven created by James Wadsworth in 1748 and printed by Kensett in 1806. Kensett became a member of the firm of Shelton & Kensett, engravers and publishers in Cheshire, Connecticut about 1812. There he created a map titled "To the Officers of the Army and the Citizens of the United States, This Map of Upper and Lower Canada and United States Contigious" dated November 4, 1812. It was published under the engraver credit line as either "Thomas Kensett" or "Engraved by T. Kensett, Cheshire & A. Doolittle, New-Haven" or "Shelton and Kensett". This is one of the few maps to show the area of conflict at the outset of the War of 1812 and includes many of the forts in the north-east United States, Upper & Lower Canada. The firm of Shelton & Kensett is also known to have reworked and relettered an engraved bust of George Washington after Gilbert Stuart, which appeared in the Connecticut Magazine, or Gentleman's and Lady's Monthly Museum. The firm also created Masonic aprons (c. 1812) currently held by the National Heritage Museum. About this time, Kensett joined the Masonic Temple Lodge No.16 in Cheshire.

== Move to New York and Tin Cans ==
By 1825, Kensett had moved to New York City, where he and his uncle obtained an early patent for storing food in tin cans and set up a small canning plant on the waterfront. This was America's first hermetically sealed fish, fruits, vegetables and meat. Originally stored in glass jars, Kensett found them expensive and prone to breakage so he switched to tin. He and his father-in-law, Ezra Daggett, were award the U.S. patent for preserving food in "vessels of tin" in 1825.^{,}^{,}

== Family life ==
Married in 1813, Thomas and Elizabeth Kensett had 6 children between 1814 and 1822 including John Frederick Kensett (1816–1872), one of America's most important 19th-century landscape painters. Thomas Kensett died 16 June 1829 at the age of 42.
