= Lake George (John Frederick Kensett) =

Painting by John Frederick Kensett

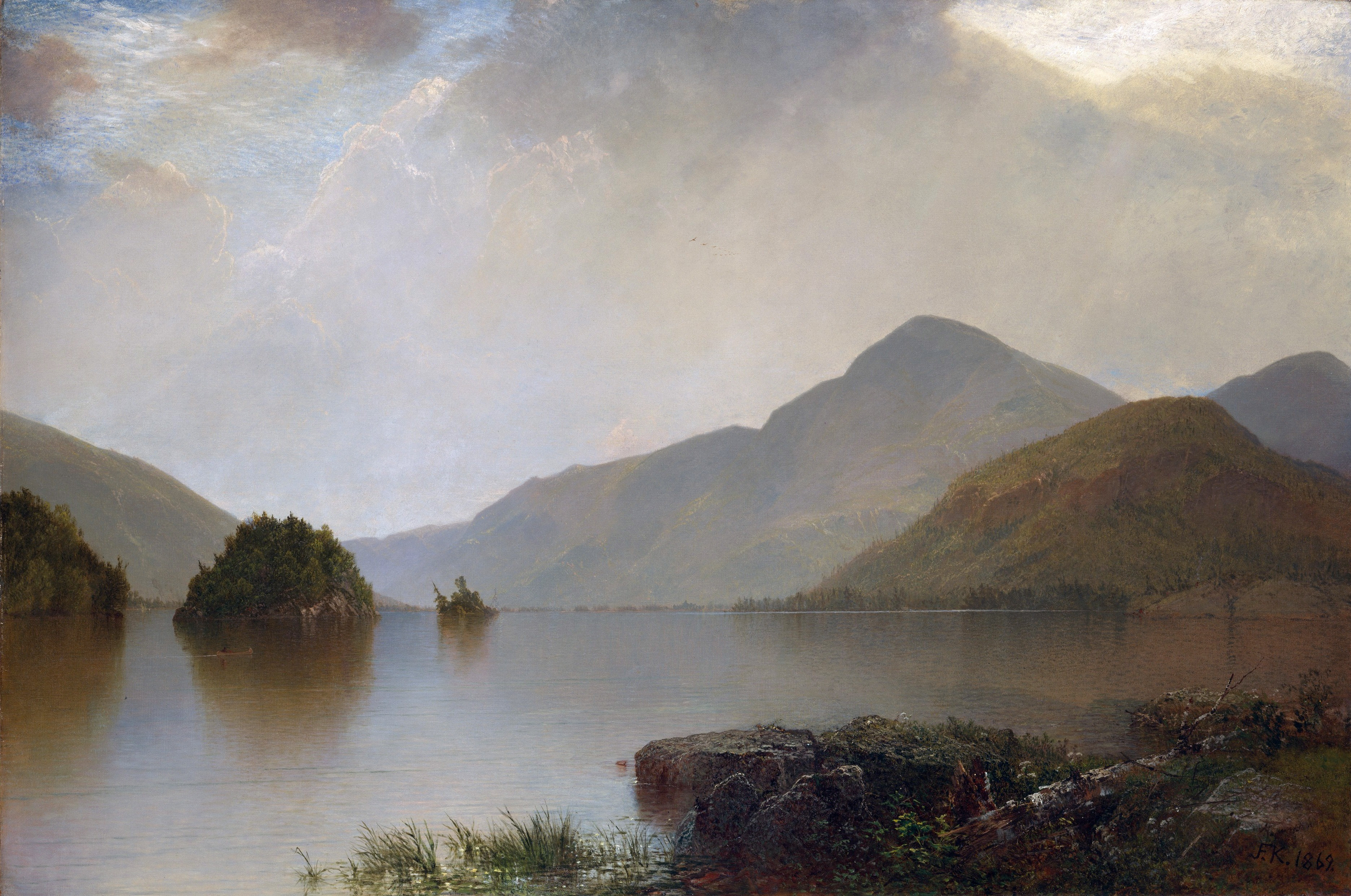
- Artist: John Frederick Kensett
- Year: 1869
- Medium: Oil on canvas
- Subject: Lake George
- Dimensions: 112.1 cm × 168.6 cm (44.1 in × 66.4 in)
- Location: Metropolitan Museum of Art; New York
- Accession: 15.30.61

Lake George is a mid 19th century painting by American artist John Frederick Kensett. Done in oil on canvas, the painting depicts Lake George in upstate New York. The painting is in the collection of the Metropolitan Museum of Art.

== Description ==
Kensett frequently visited Lake George in the Adirondacks and painted many studies of the area, but Lake George is his largest and most accomplished treatment of the subject. His viewpoint was probably from Crown Island, off Bolton Landing on the west shore, looking across the lake northeast toward the Narrows. However, as noted by the Metropolitan Museum of Art, Kensett took some artistic liberties; distances have been substantially foreshortened, some of the islands have been omitted, and others merged into the mainland.

The painting is on view at the Metropolitan Museum's Gallery 761.
