= John Frederick Kensett =

American painter

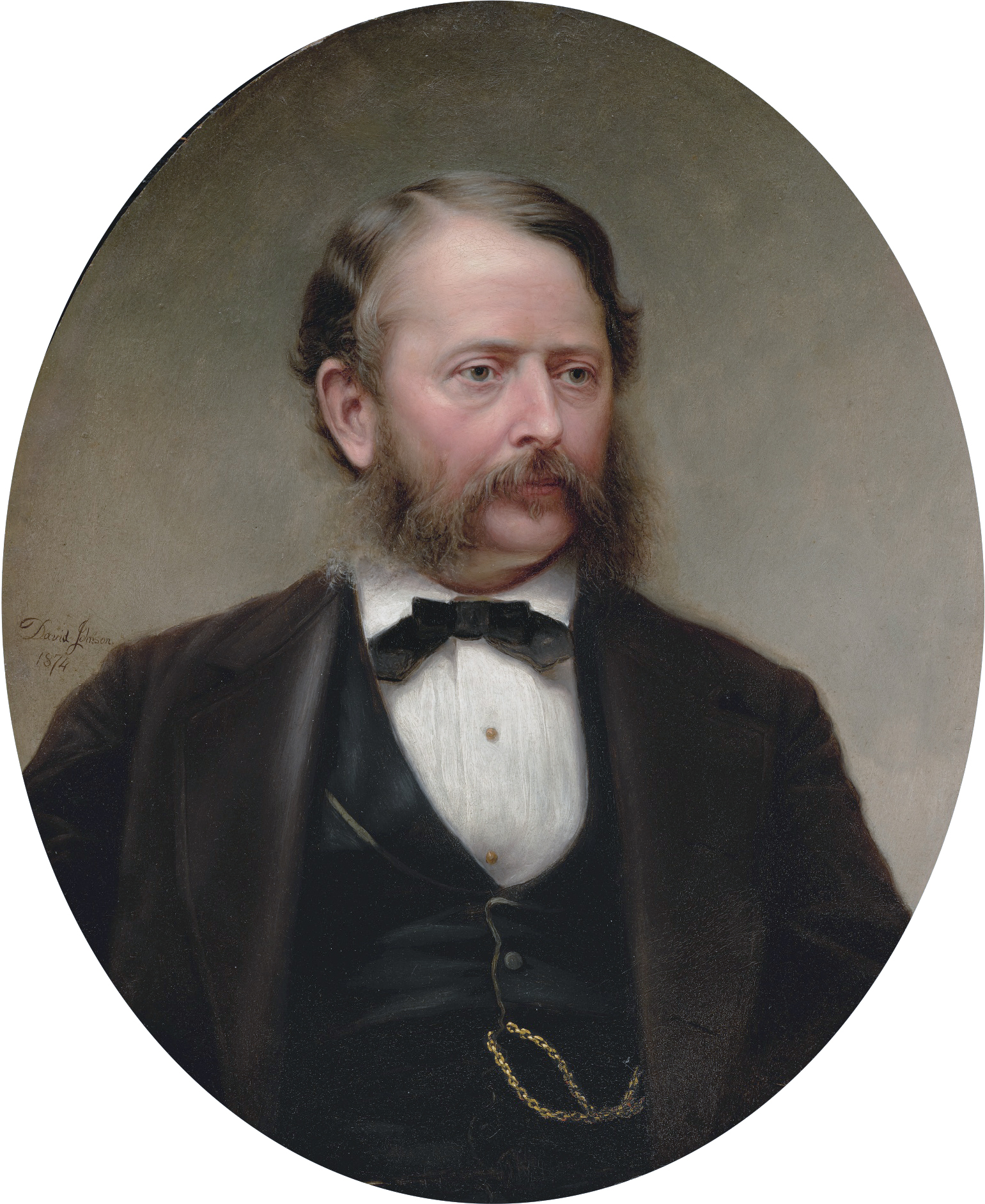
- John Frederick Kensett (David Johnson, 1874)
- Born: March 22, 1816; Cheshire, Connecticut
- Died: December 14, 1872 (aged 56); New York City
- Known for: Painting, Landscape art, Engraving
- Movement: Luminism

John Frederick Kensett (March 22, 1816 – December 14, 1872) was an American landscape painter and engraver born in Cheshire, Connecticut. He was a member of the second generation of the Hudson River School of artists. Kensett's signature works are landscape paintings of New England and New York State, whose clear light and serene surfaces celebrate transcendental qualities of nature, and are associated with Luminism. Kensett's early work owed much to the influence of Thomas Cole, but was from the outset distinguished by a preference for cooler colors and an interest in less dramatic topography, favoring restraint in both palette and composition. The work of Kensett's maturity features tranquil scenery depicted with a spare geometry, culminating in series of paintings in which coastal promontories are balanced against glass-smooth water. He was a founder of the Metropolitan Museum of Art.

== Biography ==
Born on March 22, 1816, Kensett attended school at Cheshire Academy and studied engraving with his English immigrant father, Thomas Kensett, and later with his uncle, Alfred Daggett. He worked as an engraver in the New Haven area until about 1838, then went to work as a banknote engraver in New York City.

In 1840, along with Asher Durand and John William Casilear, Kensett traveled to Europe to study painting. There he met and traveled with Benjamin Champney. The two sketched and painted throughout Europe, refining their talents. During this period, Kensett developed an appreciation and affinity for 17th-century Dutch landscape painting. Kensett and Champney returned to the United States in 1847.

=== Established studio ===
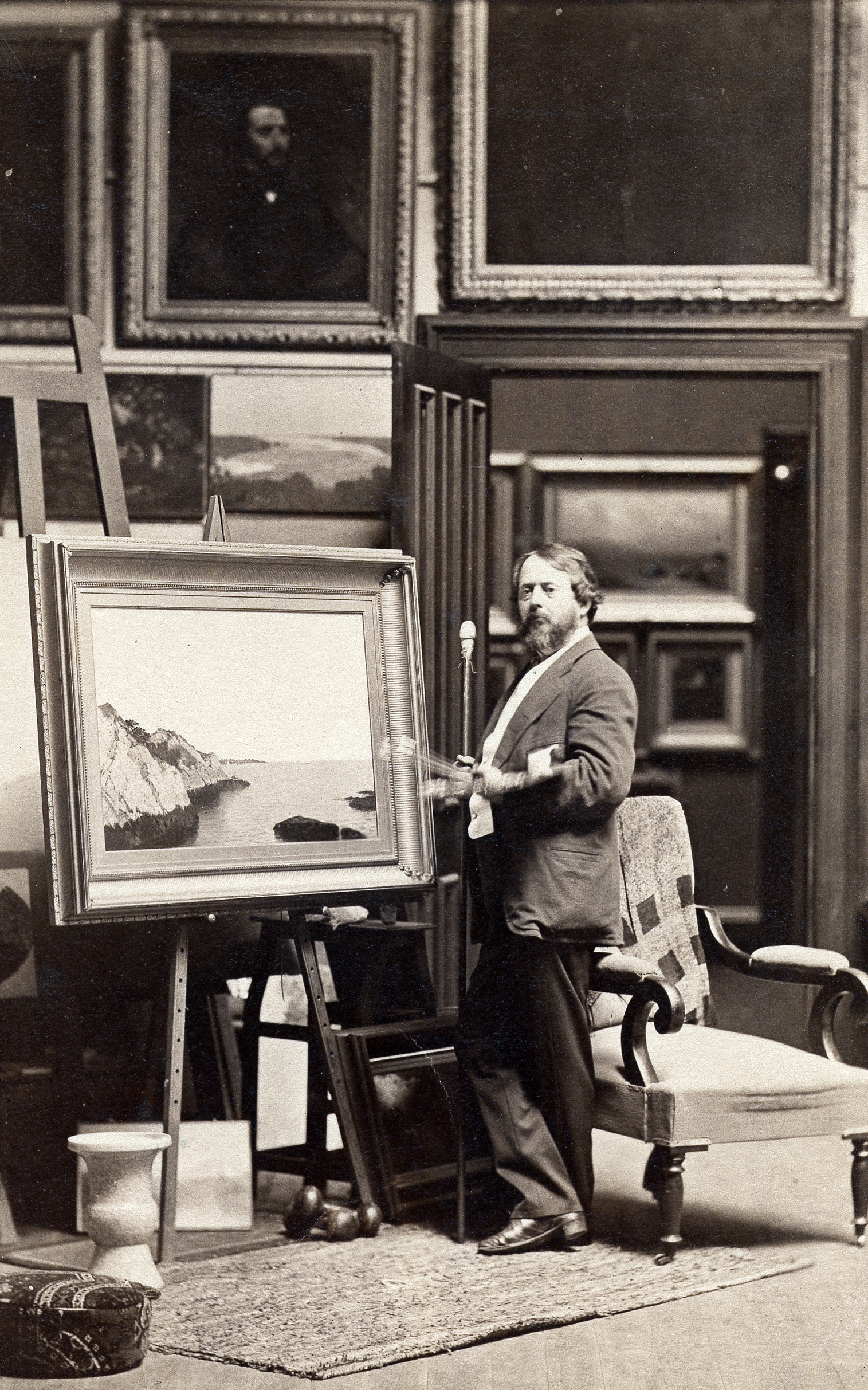
Kensett painting in his studio, ca. 1866

After establishing his studio and settling in New York, Kensett traveled extensively throughout the Northeast and the Colorado Rockies as well as making several trips back to Europe.

Kensett is best known for his landscape of upstate New York and New England and seascapes of coastal New Jersey, Long Island, and New England. He is most closely associated with the "second generation" of the Hudson River School. Along with Sanford Robinson Gifford, Fitz Henry Lane, Jasper Francis Cropsey, Martin Johnson Heade and others, the works of the "Luminists", as they came to be known, were characterized by unselfconscious, nearly invisible brushstrokes used to convey the qualities and effects of atmospheric light. Such effects stemmed from Transcendentalist philosophies of sublime nature and contemplation bringing one closer to spiritual truth. In 1848 he was elected into the National Academy of Design as an Associate member and became a full Academician in 1849.

In 1851 Kensett painted a monumental canvas of Mount Washington that has become an icon of White Mountain art. Mount Washington from the Valley of Conway was purchased by the American Art Union, made into an engraving by James Smillie, and distributed to 13,000 Art Union subscribers throughout the country. Other artists painted copies of this scene from the print. Currier and Ives published a similar print in about 1860. This single painting by Kensett helped to popularize the White Mountain region of New Hampshire.

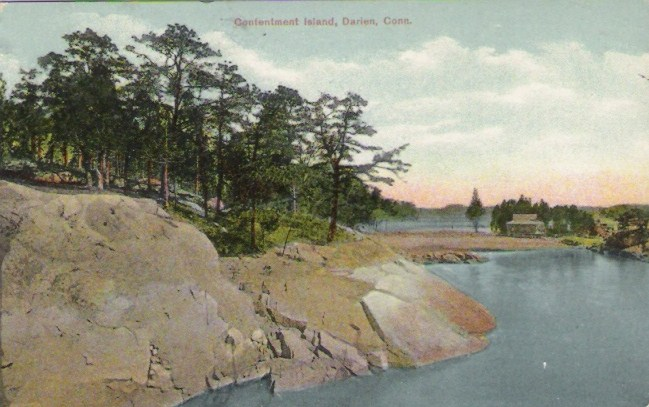
Postcard c. 1914, of Contentment Island. By the early 1870s, Kensett was spending considerable time at his home on Contentment Island, on Long Island Sound near Darien, Connecticut.

Kensett's style evolved gradually, from the traditional Hudson River School manner in the 1850s into the more refined Luminist style in his later years. By the early 1870s, Kensett was spending considerable time at his home on Contentment Island, on Long Island Sound near Darien, Connecticut.

It was during this time that Kensett painted some of his finest works. Many of these were spare and luminist seascapes, the prime example being Eaton's Neck, Long Island (1872) now in the collection of the Metropolitan Museum of Art in New York.

The artist was widely acclaimed and financially successful during his lifetime. In turn, he was generous in support of the arts and artists. He was a full member of the National Academy of Design, the founder and president of the Artists' Fund Society, and a founder and trustee of the Metropolitan Museum of Art.

== Death ==
Kensett contracted pneumonia (perhaps during the attempted rescue of Mary Lydia (Hancock) Colyer, the wife of his friend and fellow artist Vincent Colyer in Long Island Sound) and died of heart failure at his New York studio in December 1872. He is interred at Green-Wood Cemetery in Brooklyn, New York. In 1874 Kensett's brother Thomas gave thirty-eight of his paintings to the Metropolitan Museum of Art, of which half remain in the collection.

== Legacy ==
The first complete biography and factual study of Kensett's work were written by Ellen H. Johnson, published in 1957.

== Paintings ==
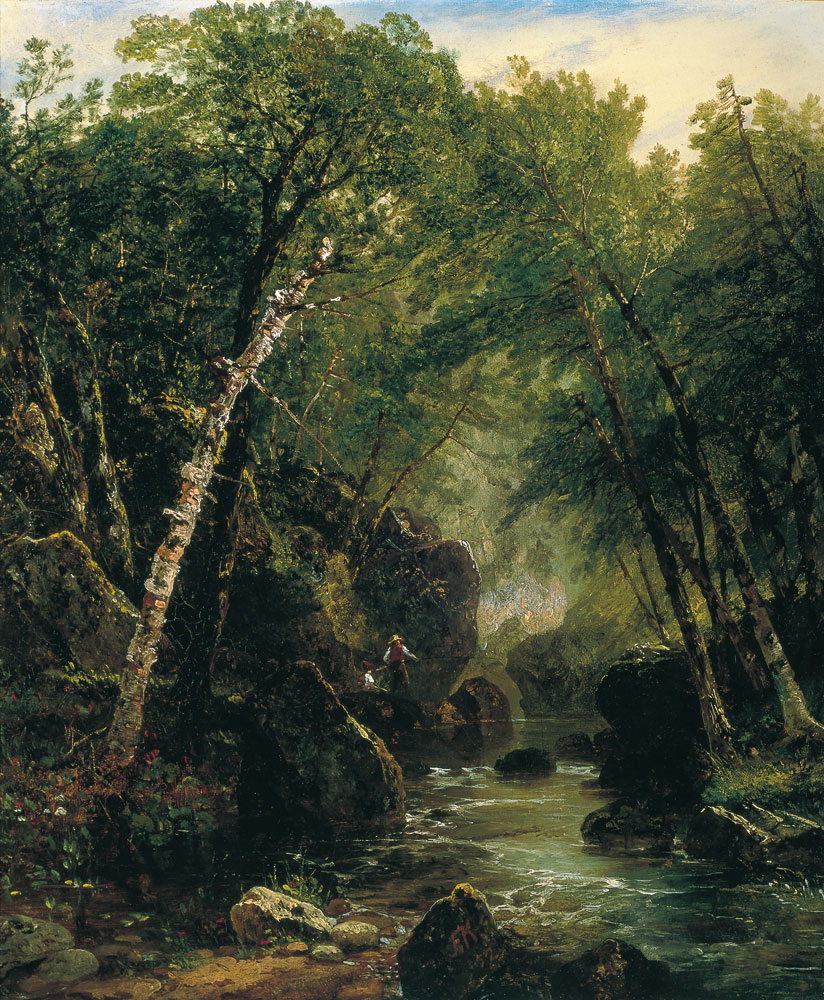
Trout Fisherman, oil on canvas, 1852. Thyssen-Bornemisza Museum

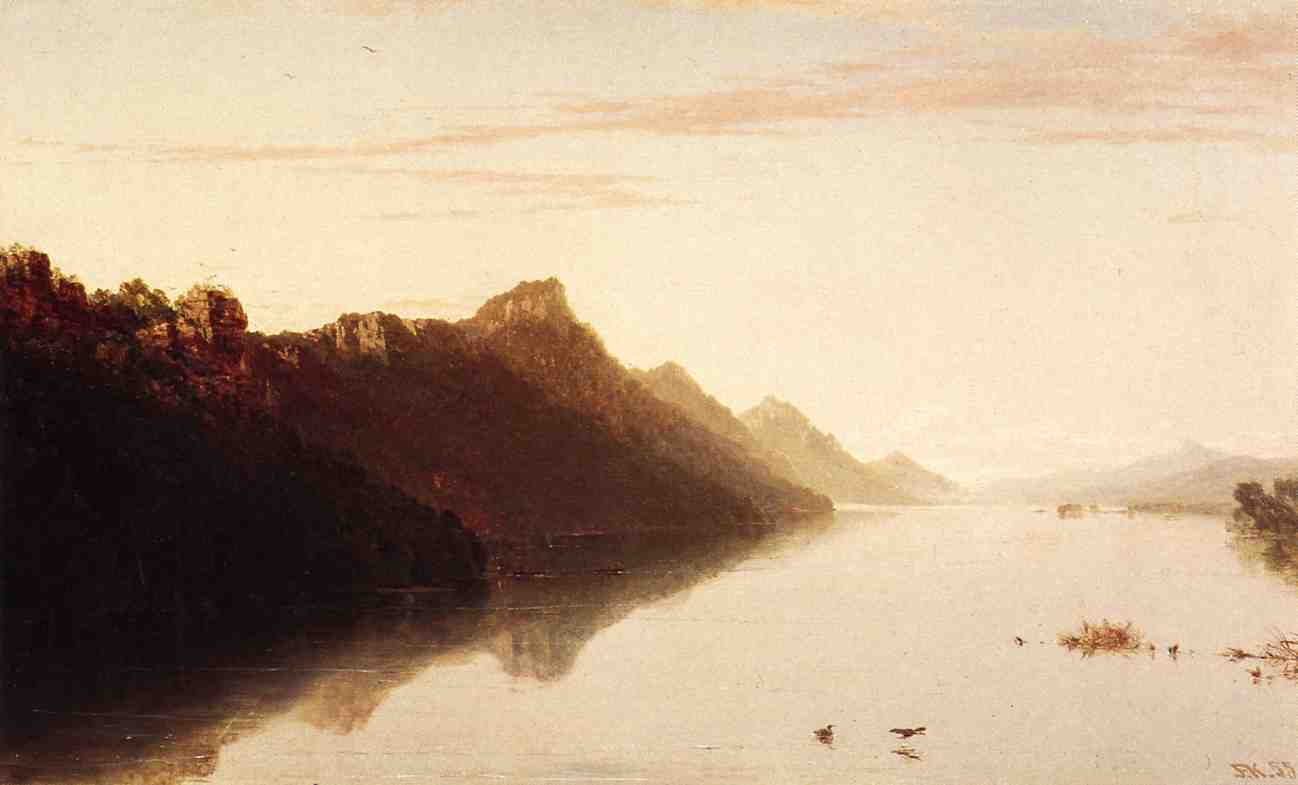
Upper Mississippi, oil on canvas, 1855. St. Louis Art Museum

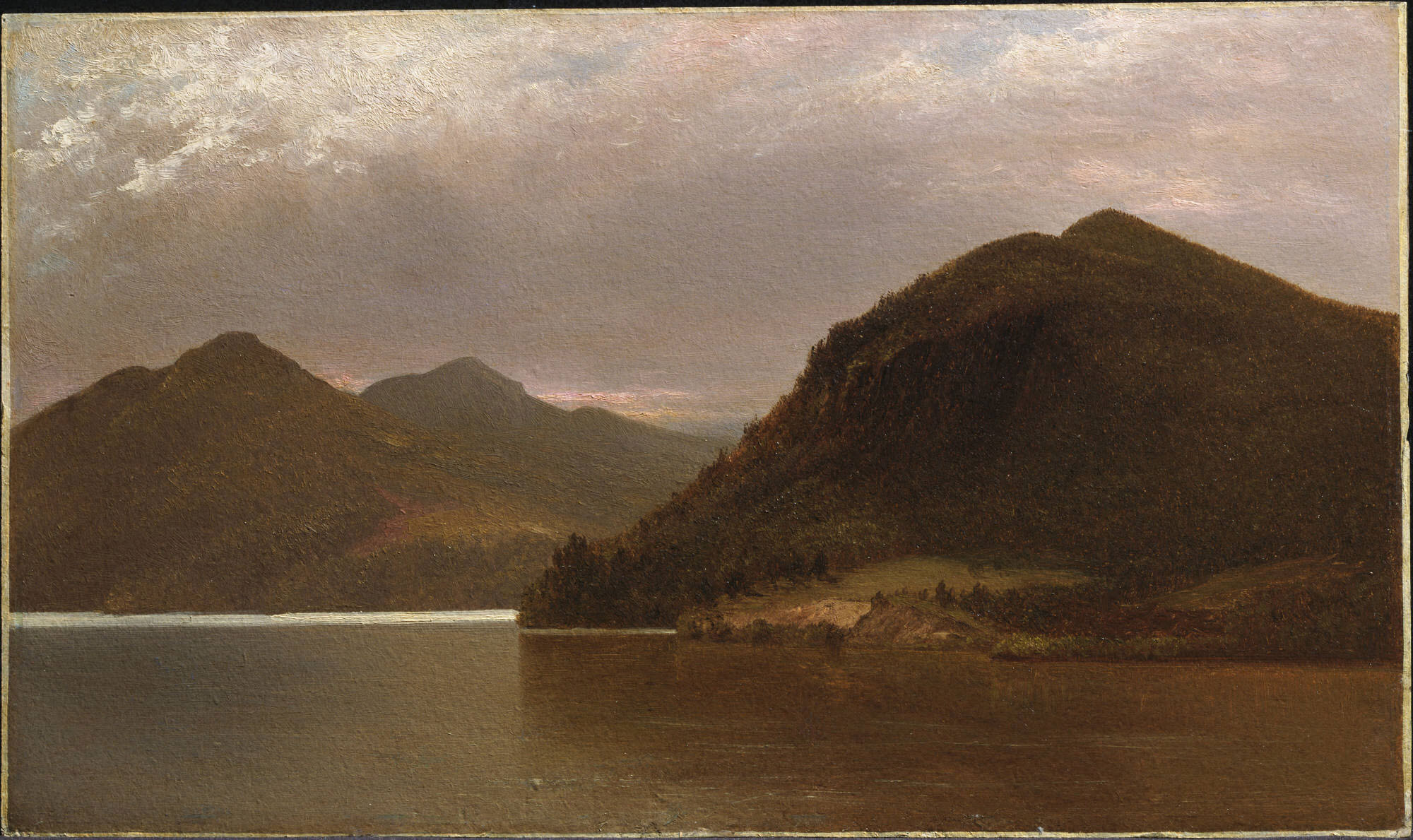
Lake George, c. 1870, Princeton University Art Museum

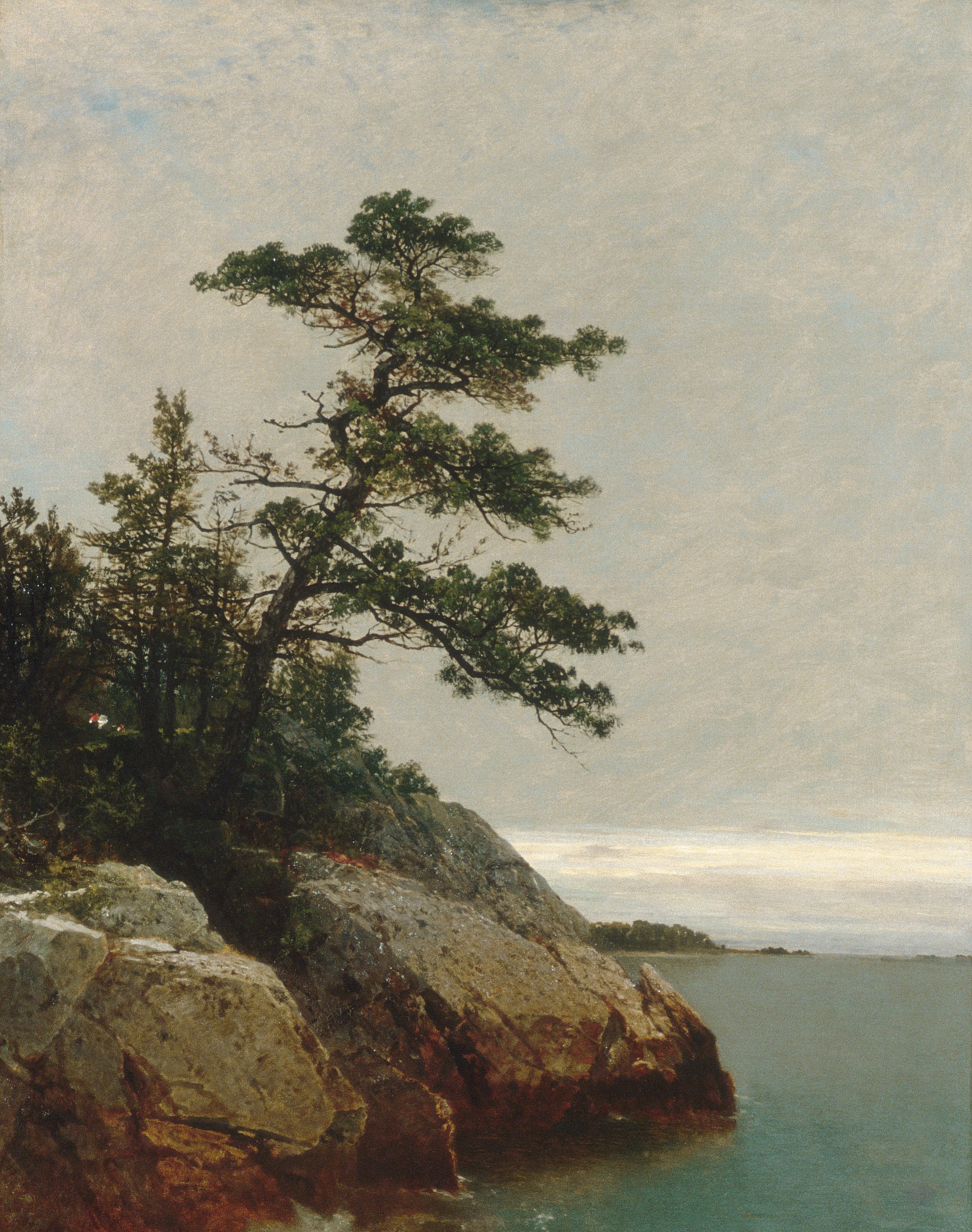
The Old Pine, Darien, Connecticut, c. 1872, Metropolitan Museum of Art, New York City

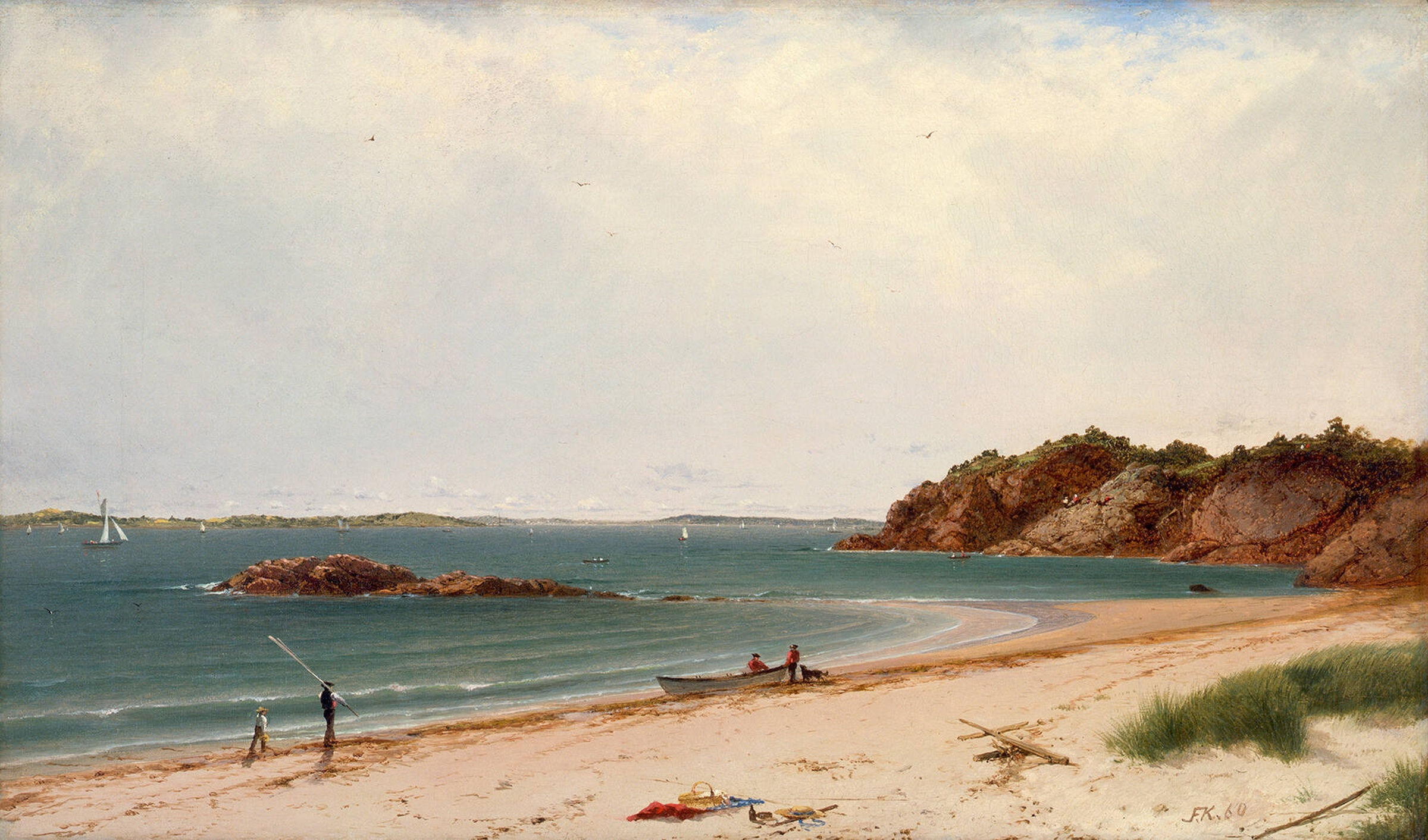
View of the Beach at Beverly, Massachusetts, oil on canvas, 1860. Santa Barbara Museum of Art

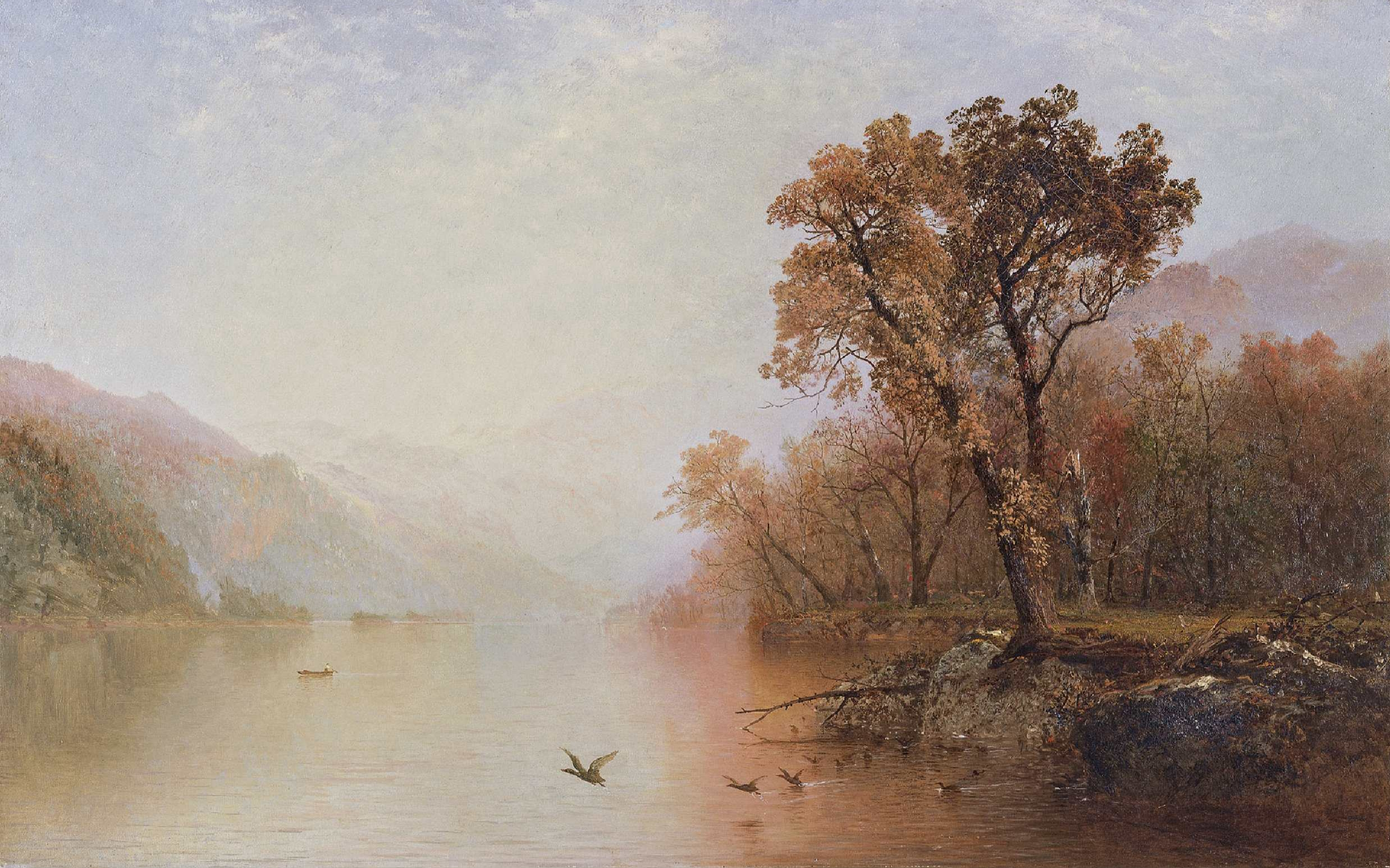
Lake George, 1860–1869. Thyssen-Bornemisza Museum

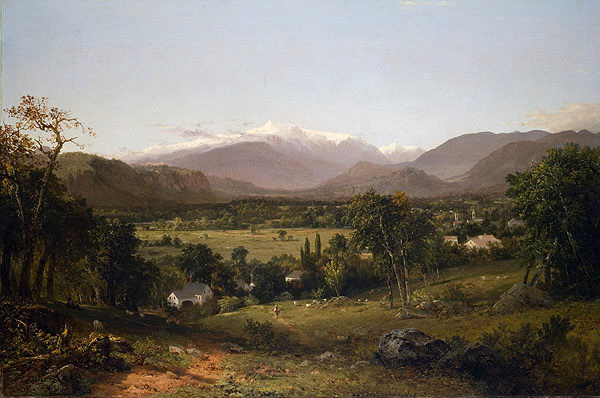
Mount Washington from the Valley of Conway, 1869, Davis Museum at Wellesley College

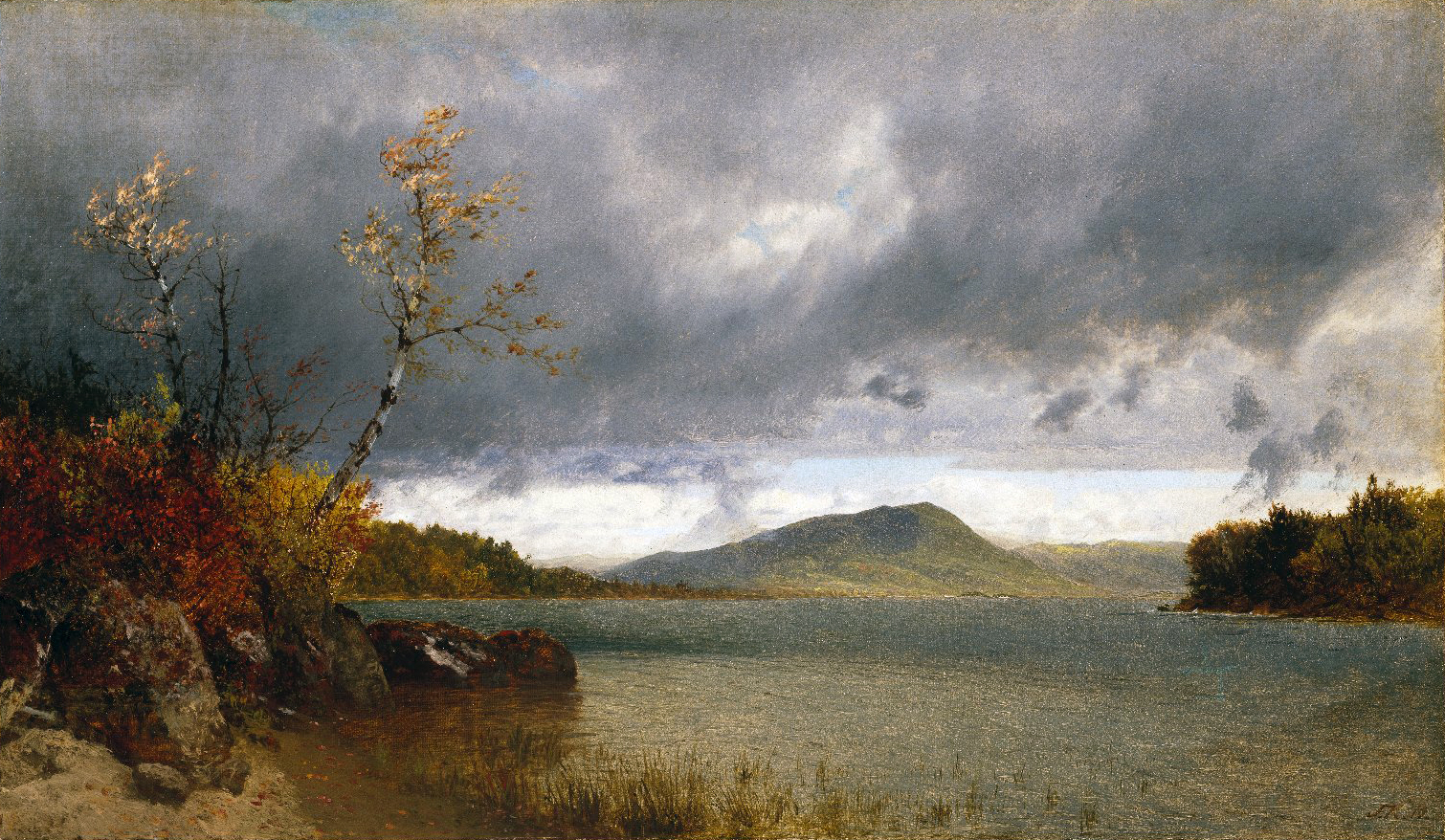
Lake George – Brooklyn Museum

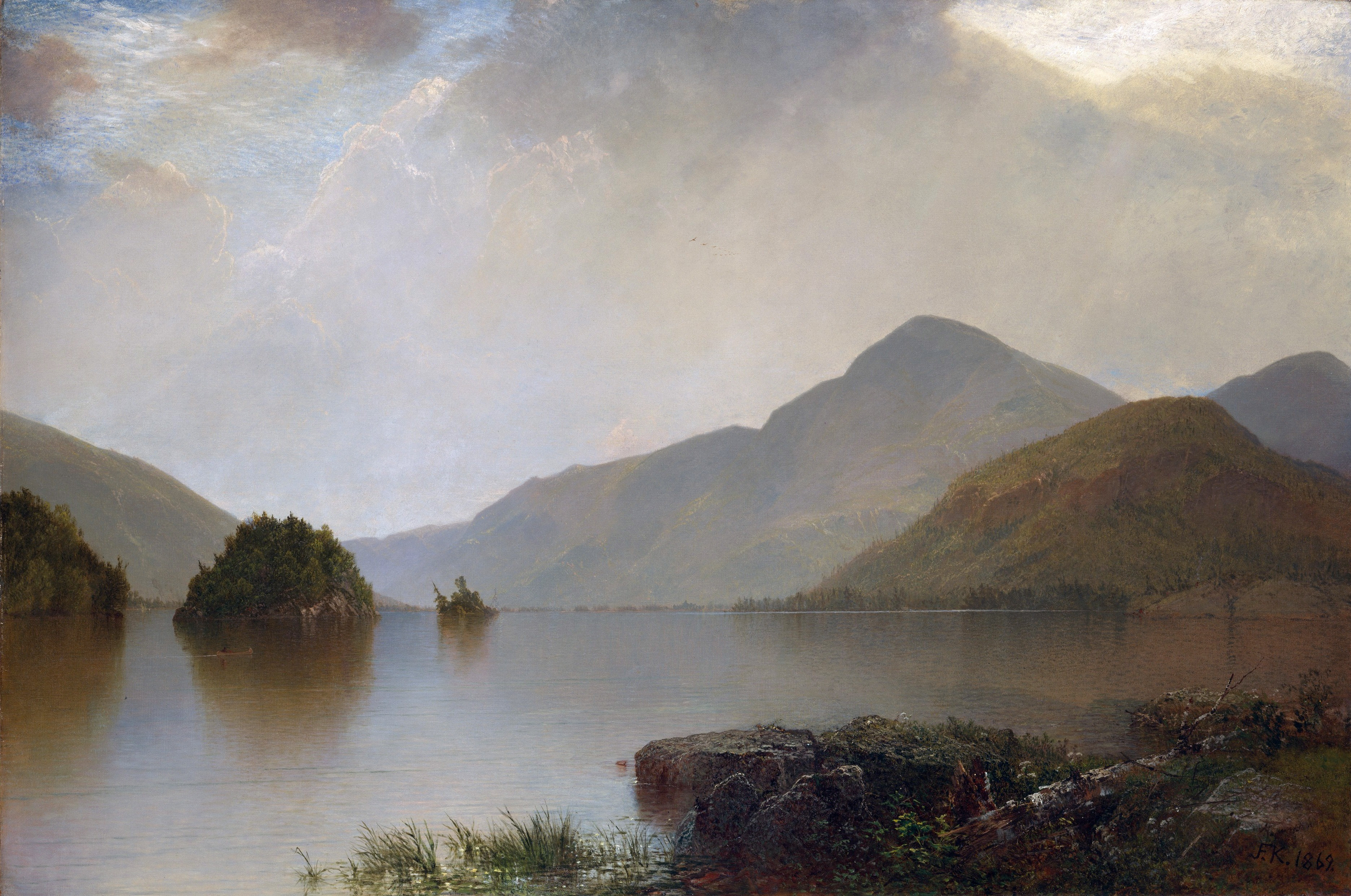
Lake George, oil on canvas, 1869, Metropolitan Museum of Art, New York City, has been called "one of the culminating works of the American tradition that began with Cole and Durand, both of whom had painted the lake."

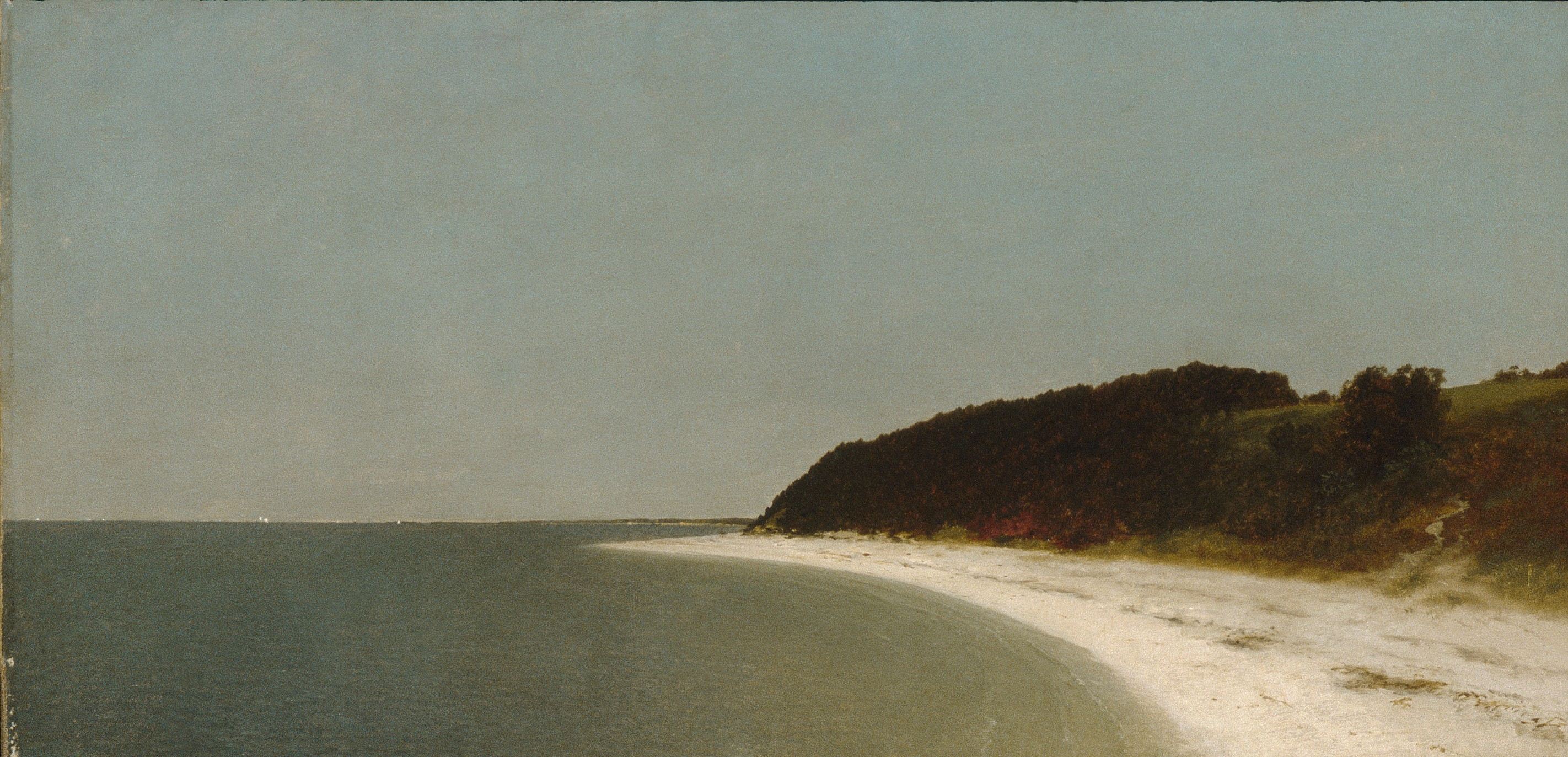
Eaton's Neck, Long Island in New York, 1872, The Metropolitan Museum of Art

== See also ==
- Western painting
- History of painting
- List of Hudson River School artists
