= The Trout Pool (Worthington Whittredge) =

Painting by Worthington Whittredge

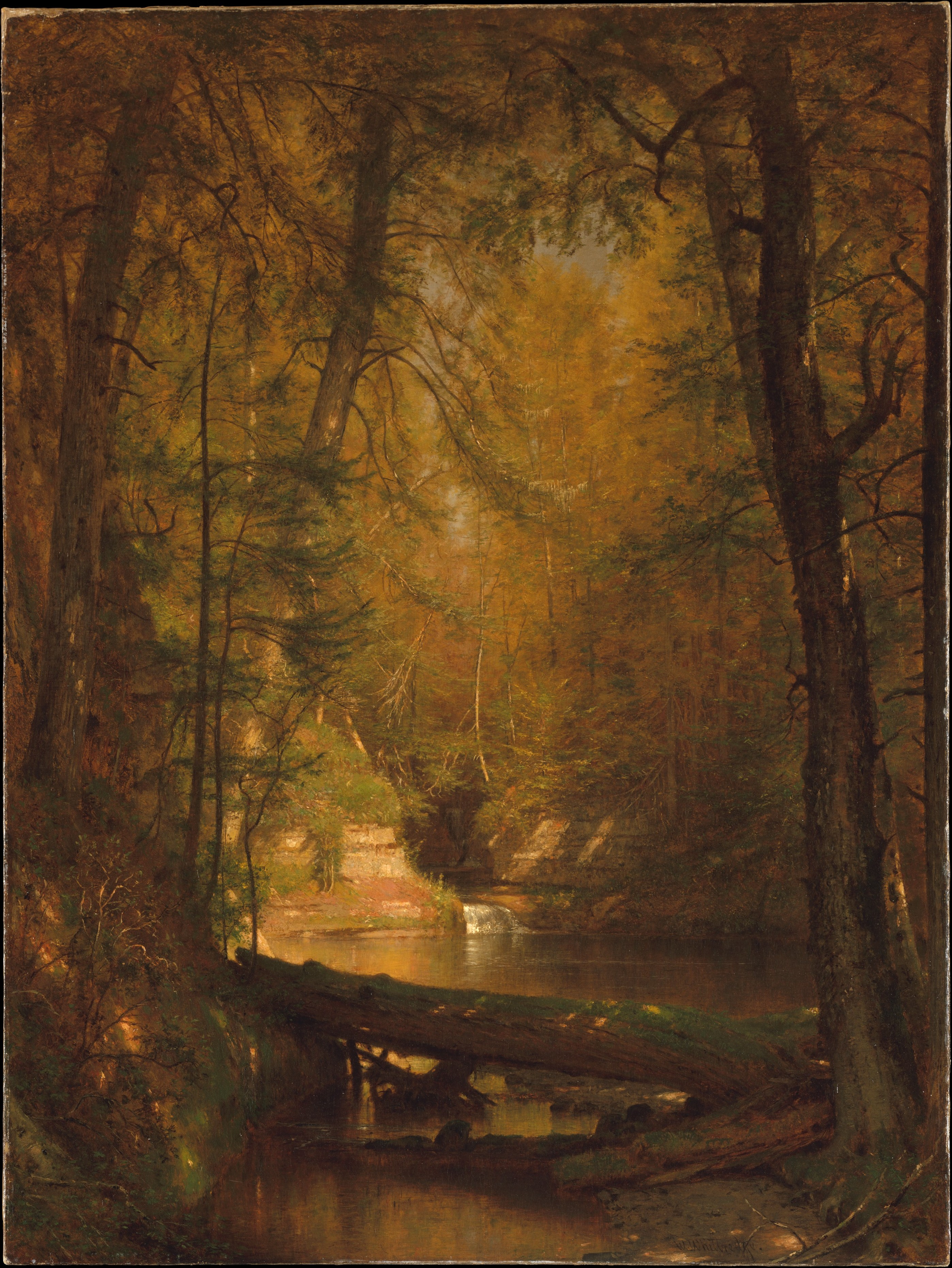
- Artist: Worthington Whittredge
- Year: 1870
- Medium: Oil on canvas
- Dimensions: 91.4 cm × 68.9 cm (36.0 in × 27.1 in)
- Location: Metropolitan Museum of Art; New York City

The Trout Pool is a mid 19th century painting by Worthington Whittredge. Done in oil on canvas, the painting depicts a fishing pond amid a dense forestscape. Whittredge's work is currently in the collection of the Metropolitan Museum of Art.
