= Mount Rainier, Bay of Tacoma – Puget Sound =

1875 painting by Sanford Robinson Gifford

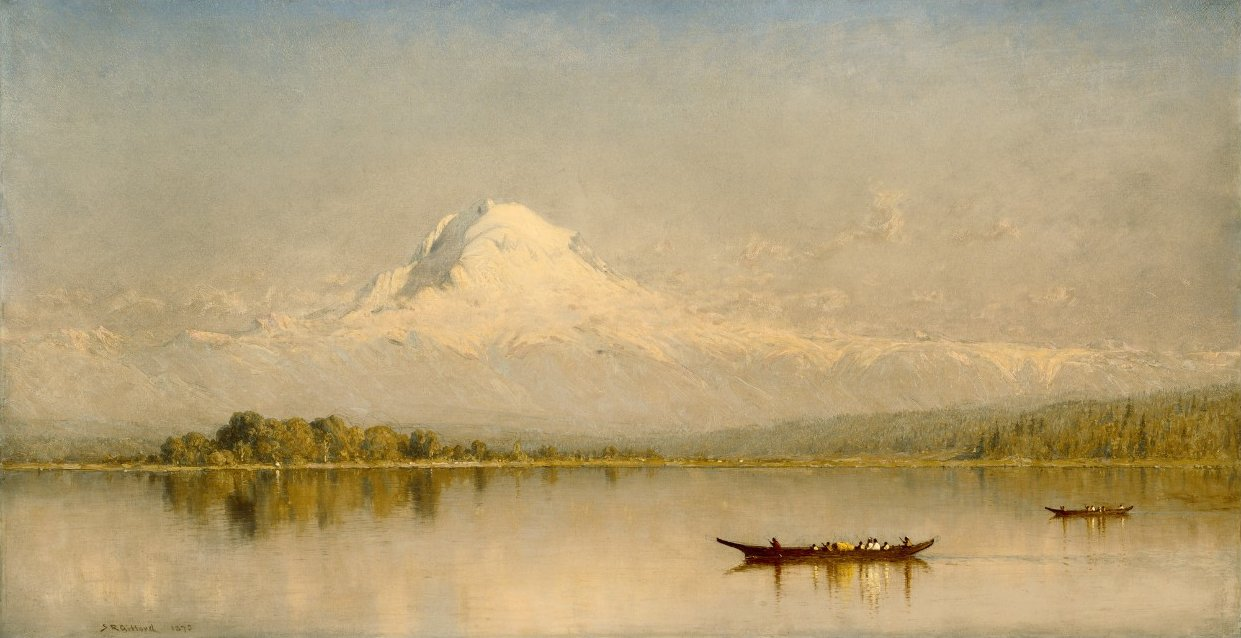
- Artist: Sanford Robinson Gifford
- Location: Seattle Art Museum, Seattle, Washington, U.S.

Mount Rainier, Bay of Tacoma – Puget Sound is an 1875 painting by Sanford Robinson Gifford. The artwork is part of the collection of the Seattle Art Museum.
