= Worthington Whittredge =

American painter

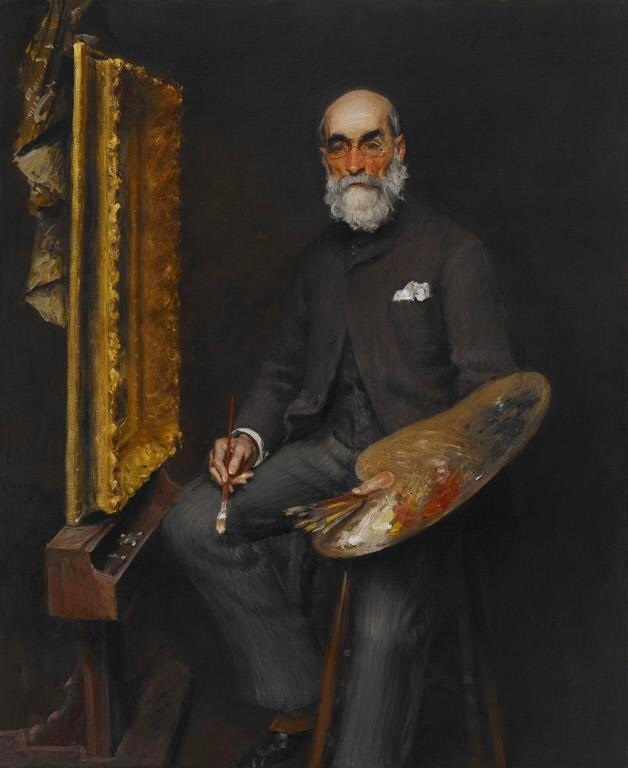
- Portrait c.1890
- Born: Thomas Worthington Whittredge; May 22, 1820; Springfield, Ohio, US
- Died: February 25, 1910 (aged 89); Summit, New Jersey, US
- Education: Hudson River School, Düsseldorf Academy
- Notable work: The Trout Pool (1870)
- Style: Landscape
- Spouse: Euphemia Foot-Whittredge
- Website: thomasworthingtonwhittredge.org

Thomas Worthington Whittredge (May 22, 1820 – February 25, 1910) was an American artist of the Hudson River School. Whittredge was a highly regarded artist of his time, and was friends with several leading Hudson River School artists including Albert Bierstadt and Sanford Robinson Gifford. He traveled widely and excelled at landscape painting, many examples of which are now in major museums. He served as president of the National Academy of Design from 1874 to 1875 and was a member of the selection committees for the 1876 Philadelphia Centennial Exposition and the 1878 Paris Exposition, both important venues for artists of the day.

== Childhood ==
Whittredge was born in a log cabin on the farm of his father, Captain Joseph Whittredge, near the Little Miami River less than 50 miles northeast of Springfield, Ohio, in 1820. Prior to moving to Ohio and before Worthington was born, his family had lived in New England where his father was a sea captain. As a boy, Worthington was an avid trapper and by the age of sixteen, had made $400 from trapping animals, preparing, and selling their pelts (approx. $11,200 in 2020). He recalls his works, stating in his autobiography: "I certainly earned this sum. Often, in the coldest nights of winter, in rain, in snow and sleet, have I got out of my warm bed and gone sometimes as far as three miles to look after my traps and been home again in daylight, to begin my regular duties on my father's farm." During the first sixteen years of his life, he had little time, if any, for activities outside of the field and forests, and did not have any formal education until he was about seventeen.

== Young adult life ==
At this time, his parents granted him permission to travel to Cincinnati, Ohio, where he would live with his sister and work as a house painter. This decision to leave for Cincinnati was in part his desire to become an artist, an endeavor his father would find disgraceful, a claim supported by Whittredge's autobiography, as he states: "To him [Worthington's father] the very word 'artist' was an anathema, any man who proposed to spend his life dabbling with crayons and paints was, in my father's estimation, a lost soul, and, in addition, a very foolish one."

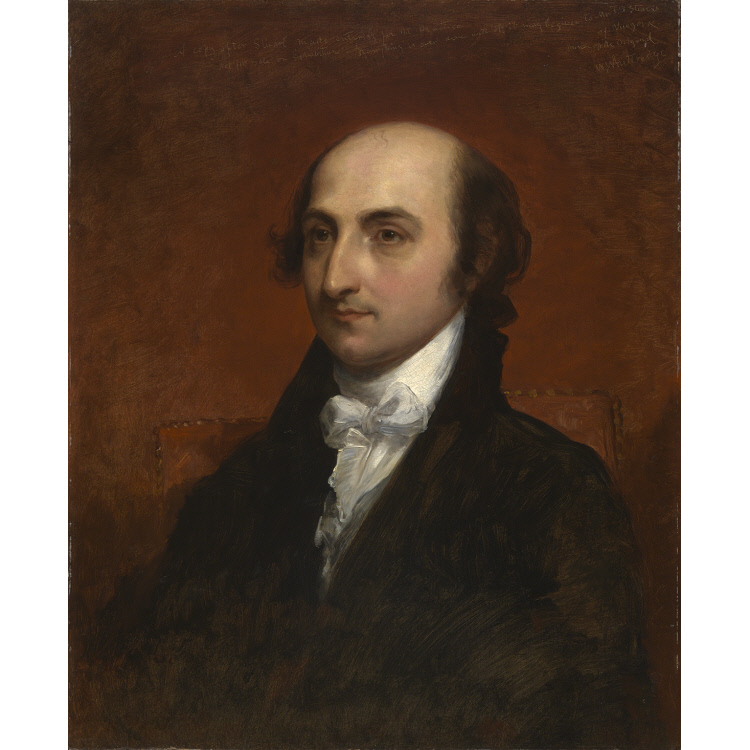
Portrait of Albert Gallatin by Worthington Whittredge (1859)

Soon after beginning his work in house painting, he graduated to painting signs where he taught himself at night. He briefly made daguerrotypes and for a span of a few years painted portraits while traveling the country but soon became dissatisfied. Whittredge found his paintings "colorless, dark, ugly and not fit to exist." He found that portraits required too much draftsmanship, a skill he estimated himself lacking. Rather, he found his strengths lay in that of color and simplification, matching the stylistic demands for landscapes of the time. Of the portraits he painted, he considered his best work - which he considered "not a bad one" - to be of a gentleman he befriended, Henry Ward Beecher. In 1843, Whittredge returned to Cincinnati where he began as a landscape artist, learning much himself, but also learned from other artists in his area, whether they lived there or were simply passing through.

During the 1840s, there was a great desire for landscapes which Whittredge painted many of during this time, and he quickly gained a good reputation locally from locals, who he would spend his time conversing with, as well as wealthy patrons who would sponsor his work. In 1846, he sent one of his landscapes to the National Academy of Design in New York, where it was accepted. The president of the academy of the time, Asher B. Durand sent Worthington a complimentary note for his work.

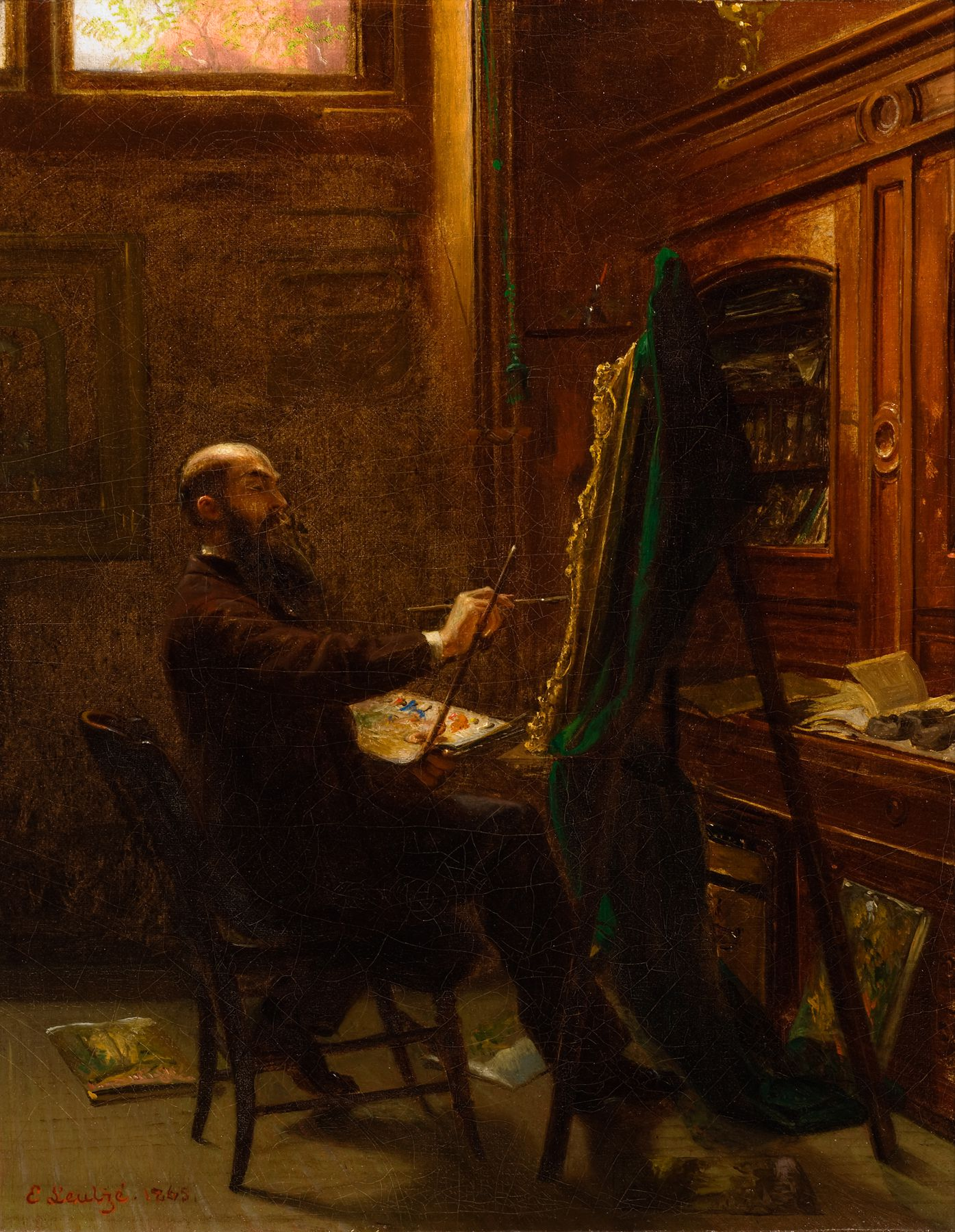
Worthington Whittredge in His Tenth Street Studio by Emmanuel Leutze (1865)

== Adult life ==
Worthington wanted to visit Europe and obtained many advance orders on paintings, so that he would have work once he arrived in the foreign land. His intention for traveling to Europe was threefold; to refine his craft and become a better painter, study the works of contemporary artists, whose work exists in Europe, and receive instruction from current masters of the art. On his way to Europe, he stopped in London on his 29th birthday, May 22, 1849.

Arriving in Germany he settled at the Düsseldorf Academy, a major art school of the period, and studied with Emanuel Leutze. At Düsseldorf, Whittredge befriended Bierstadt and posed for Leutze as both George Washington and a steersman in Leutze's famous painting, Washington Crossing the Delaware, now in the collection of the Metropolitan Museum of Art in New York City. He is associated with the Düsseldorf school of painting.

Whittredge spent nearly ten years in Europe, meeting and traveling with other important artists including Sanford Gifford. He returned to the United States in 1859 and settled in New York City where he launched his career as a landscape artist painting in the Hudson River School style.

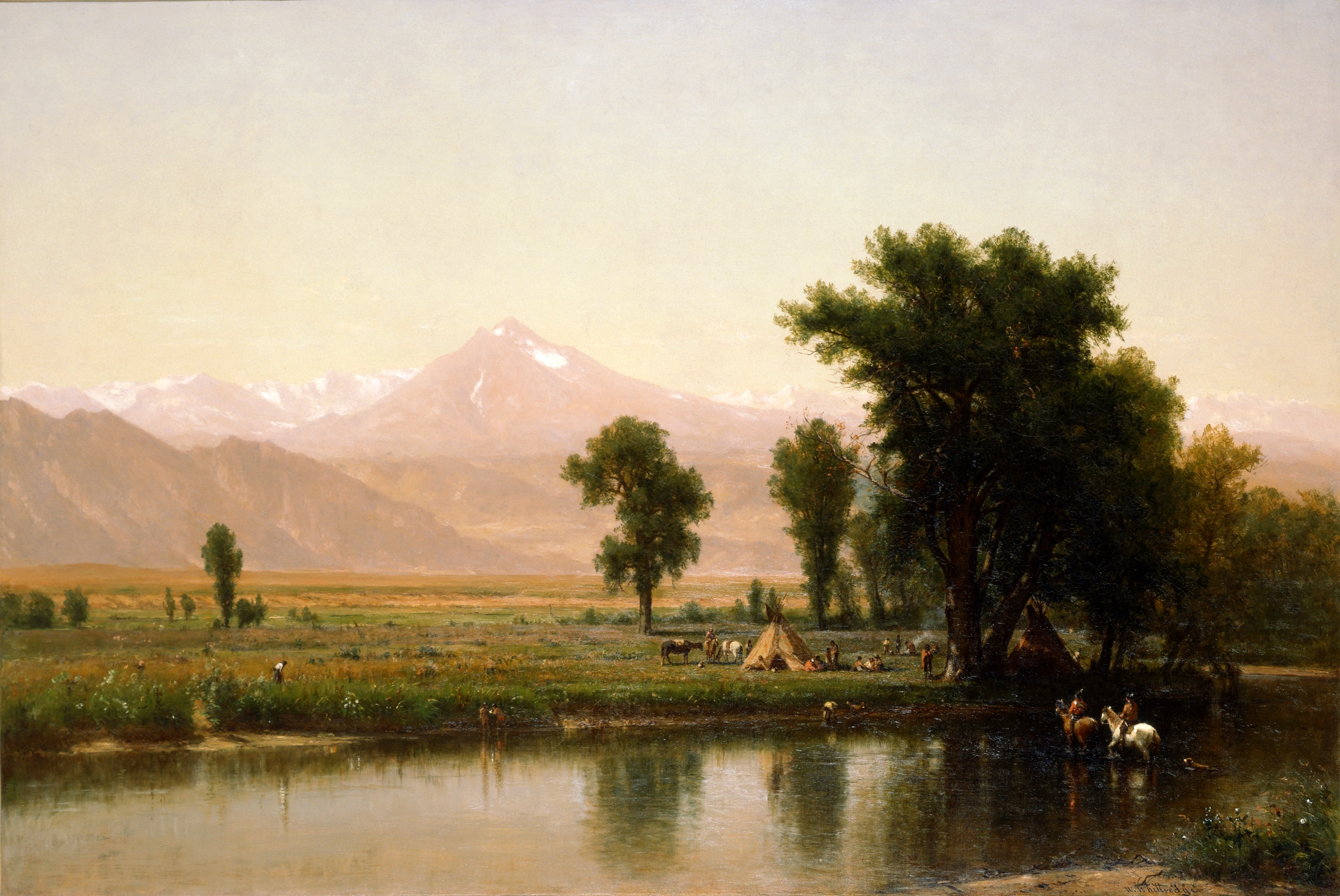
Crossing the River Platte, 1871, hanging in the White House Roosevelt Room

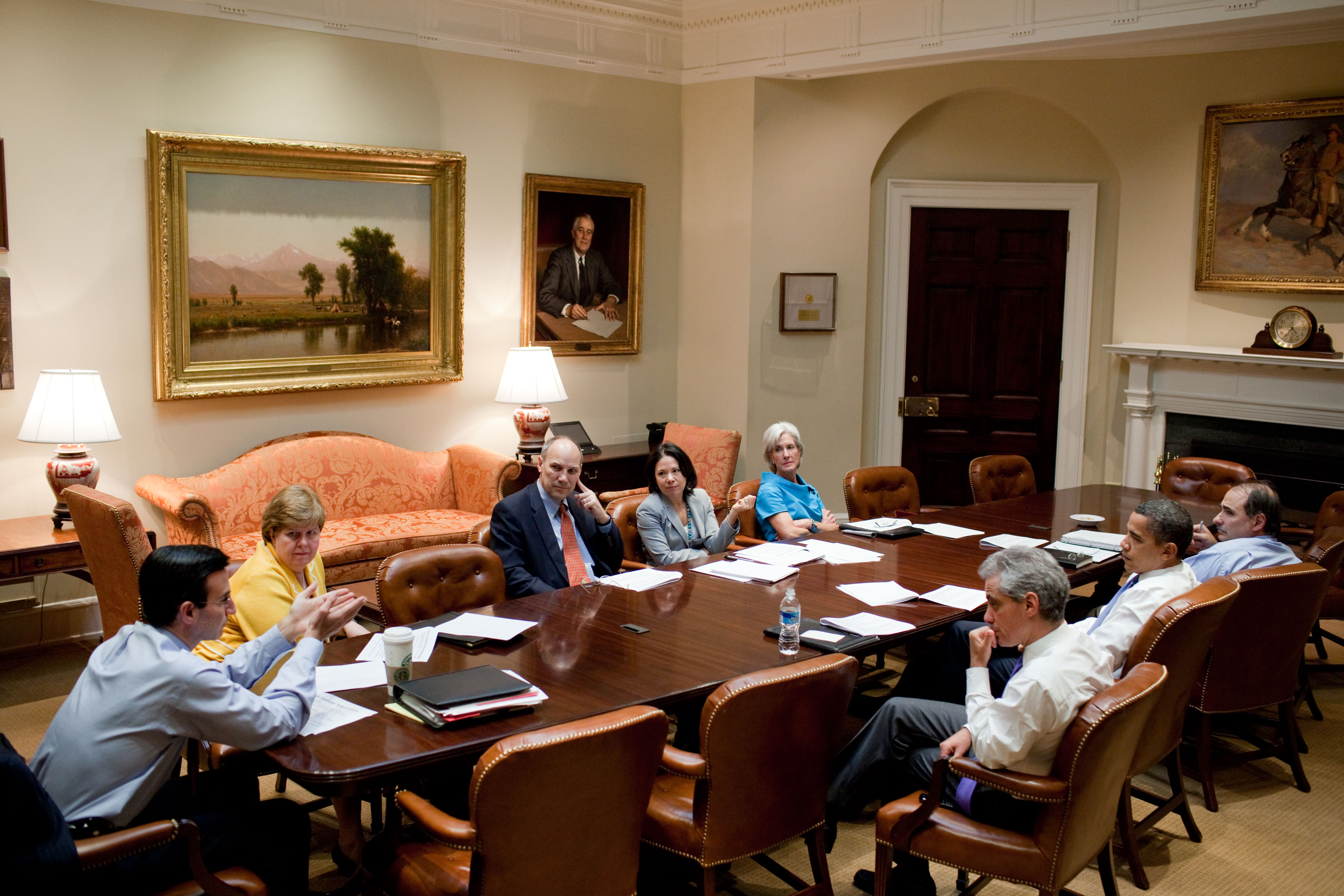
The aforementioned painting can be seen on the left side of image in the Roosevelt Room in the White House

Whittredge journeyed across the Great Plains to the Rocky Mountains in 1865 with Sanford Gifford and John Frederick Kensett. The trip resulted in some of Whittredge's most important works—unusually oblong, sparse landscapes that captured the stark beauty and linear horizon of the Plains. Whittredge later wrote in his autobiography, "I had never seen the plains or anything like them. They impressed me deeply. I cared more for them than for the mountains... Whoever crossed the plains at that period, notwithstanding its herds of buffalo and flocks of antelope, its wild horses, deer and fleet rabbits, could hardly fail to be impressed with its vastness and silence and the appearance everywhere of an innocent, primitive existence."

Whittredge moved to Summit, New Jersey, in 1880 where he continued to paint for the rest of his life. He died in 1910 at the age of 89 and was buried upon his death in the Springfield, New Jersey cemetery.

== Works ==
Whittredge's paintings are held in the collections of numerous museums, including the Metropolitan Museum of Art in New York City, the Utah Museum of Fine Arts in Salt Lake City, the Smithsonian American Art Museum in Washington, D.C. and the Louvre Museum in Paris, France.

== Gallery ==
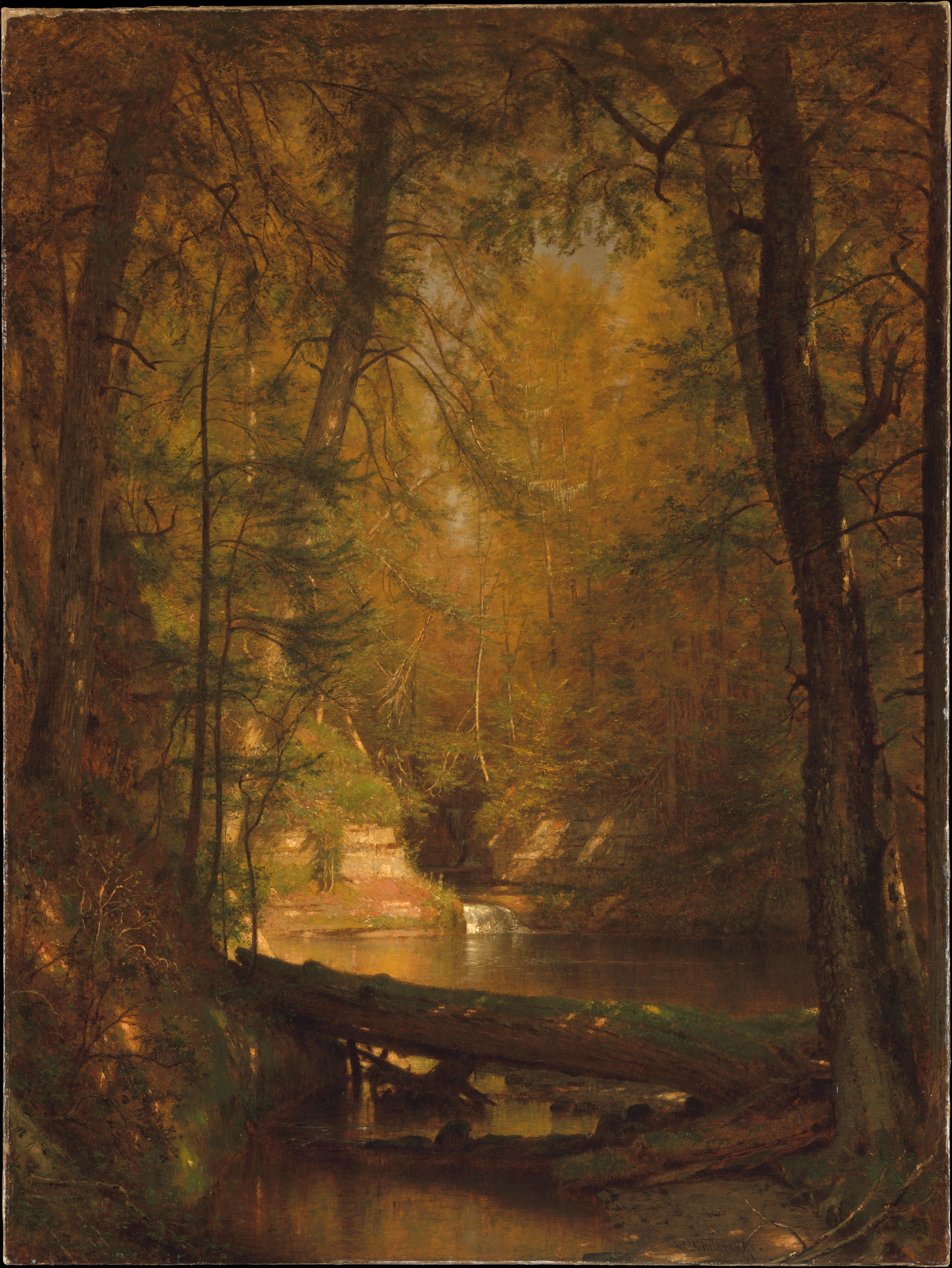
The Trout Pool (1870)

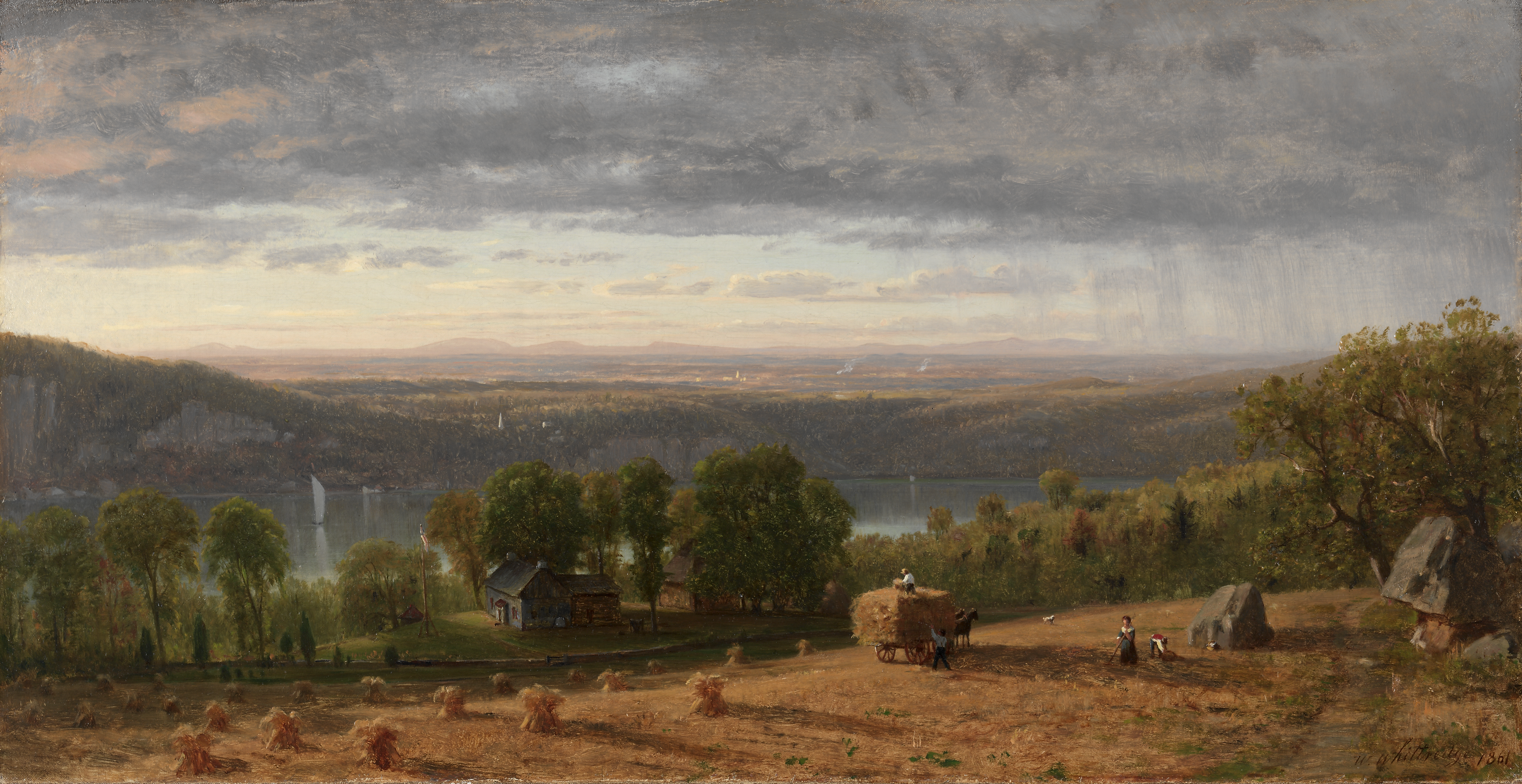
Landscape with Haywain (1861)

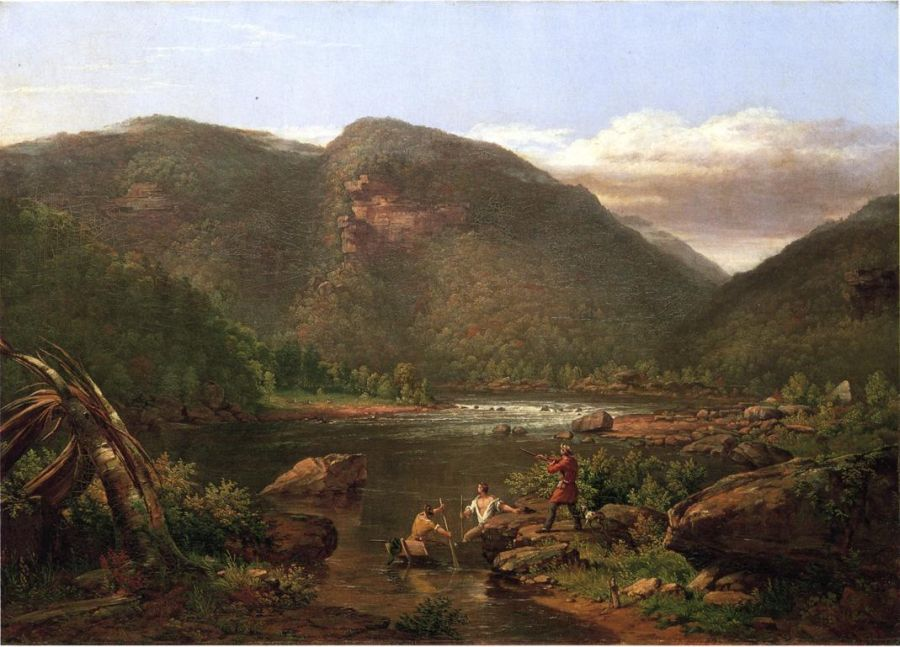
Crow's Nest (1848)

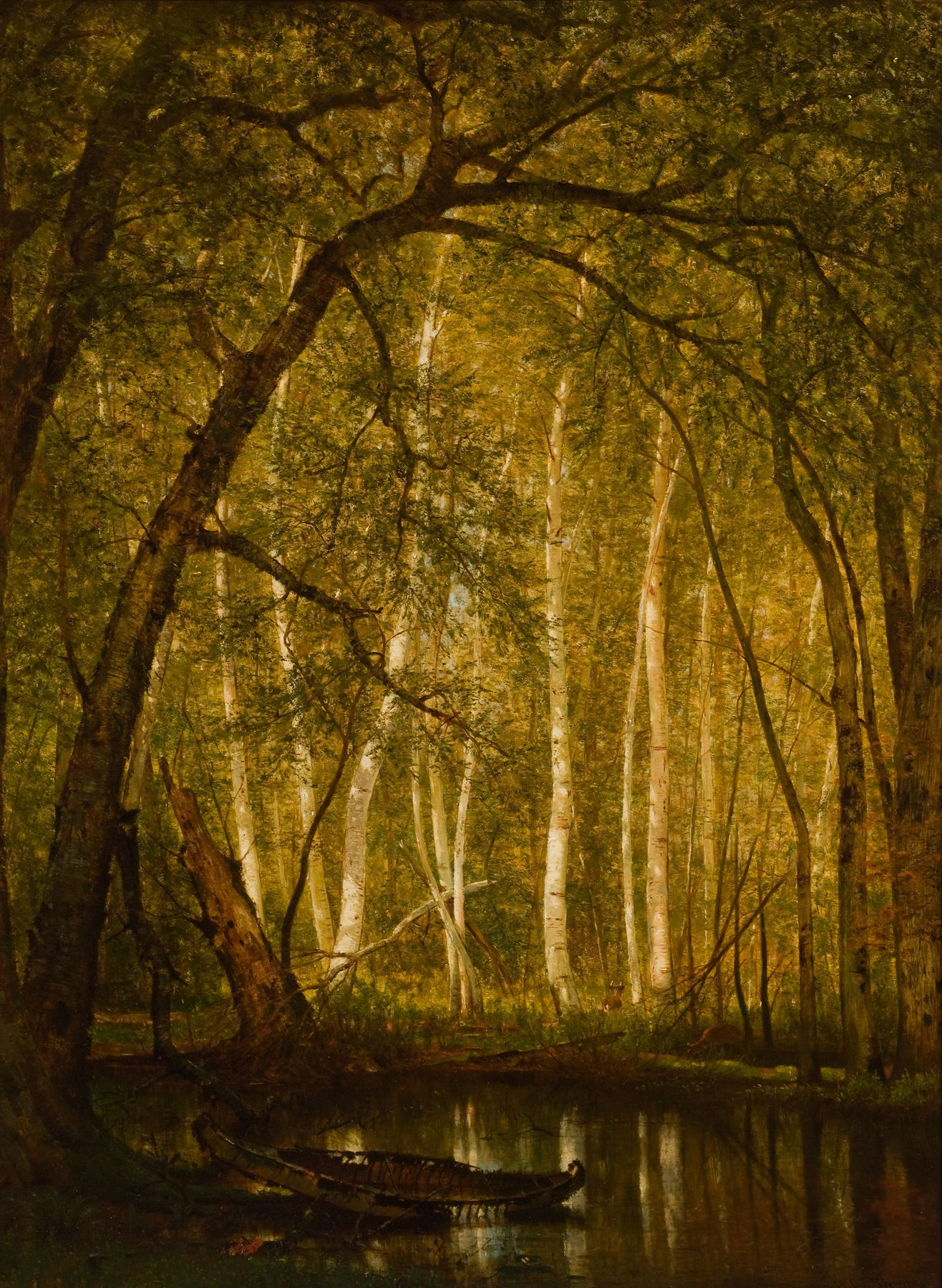
The Old Hunting Grounds (1864)

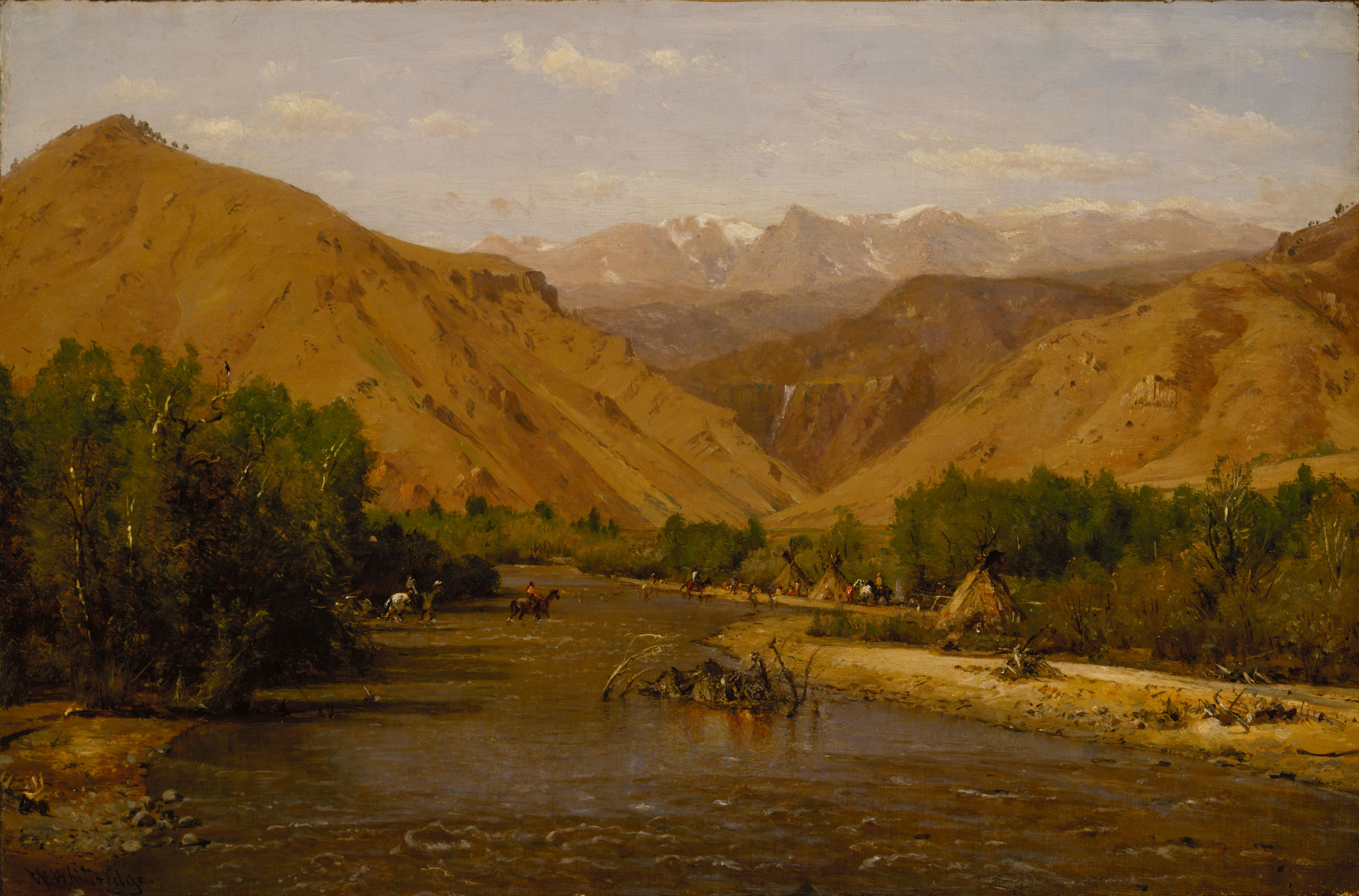
Indian Encampment (c.1870)

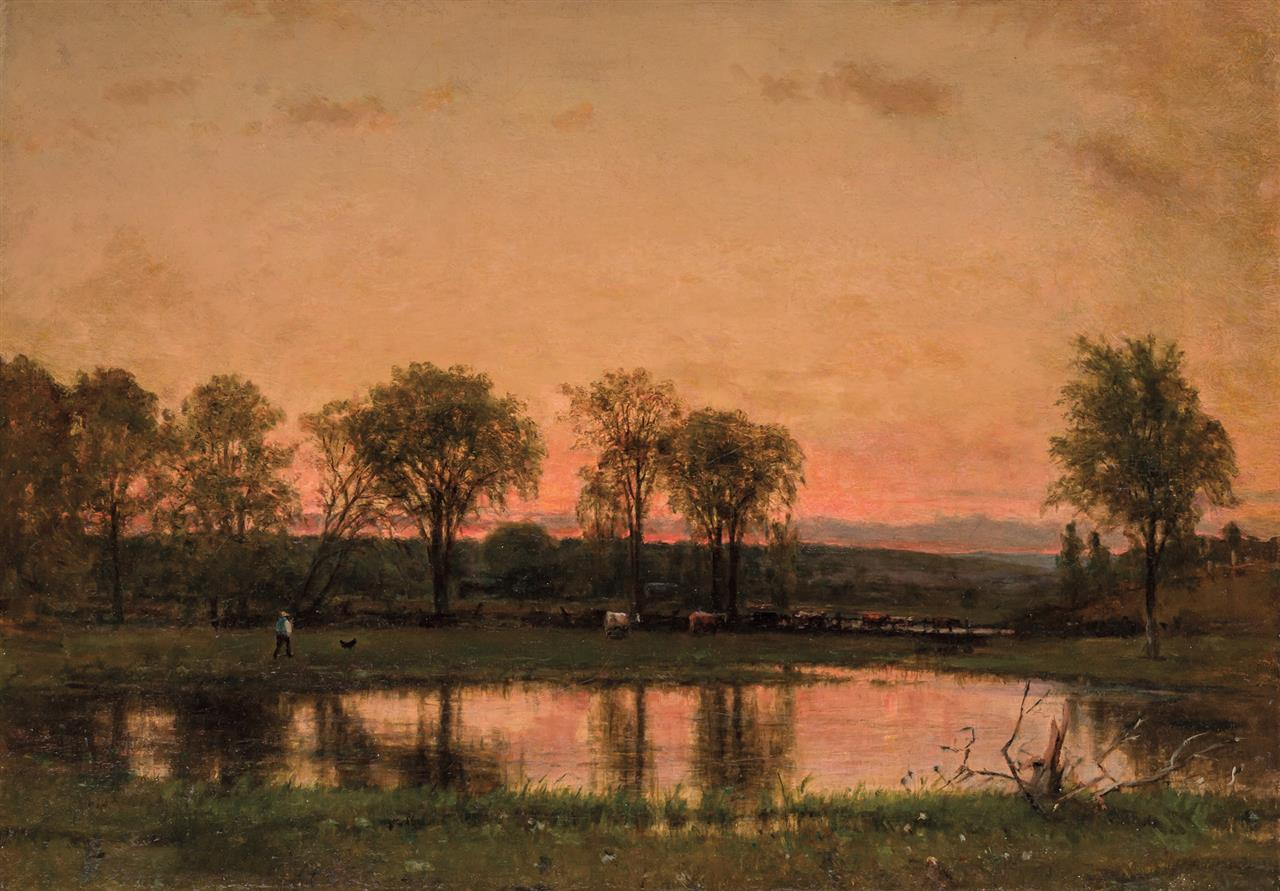
Evening Glow (unknown)

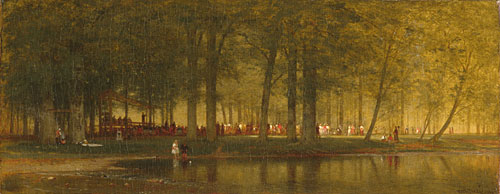
The Camp Meeting (1874)

== See also ==
- List of Hudson River School artists
- Landscape
- Painting
