= Sanford Robinson Gifford =

American painter (1823–1880)

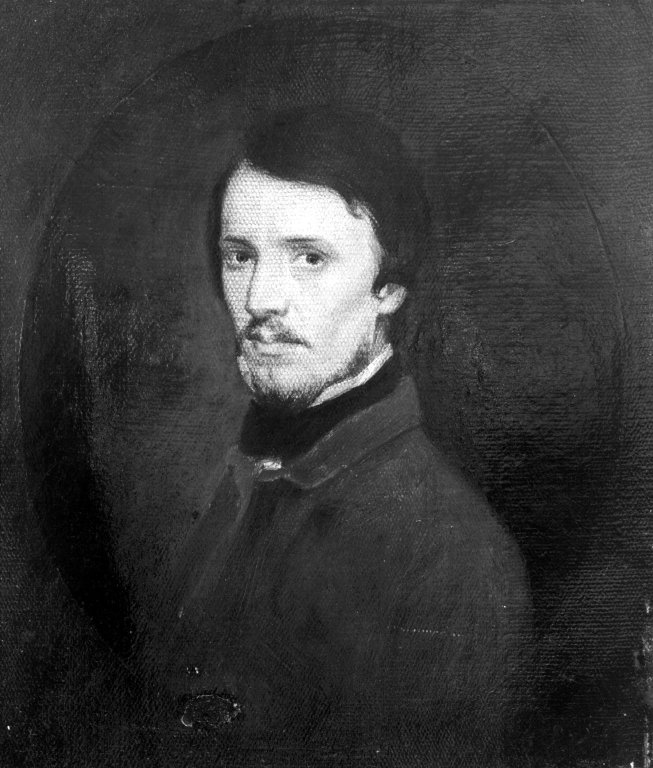
- Study for a Self-Portrait (c.1848), Brooklyn Museum
- Born: July 10, 1823; Greenfield, New York, U.S.
- Died: August 29, 1880 (aged 57); New York City, New York, U.S.
- Known for: Landscape art, Painting
- Movement: Luminism

Sanford Robinson Gifford (July 10, 1823 – August 29, 1880) was an American landscape painter and a leading member of the second generation of Hudson River School artists. A highly-regarded practitioner of Luminism, his work was noted for its emphasis on light and soft atmospheric effects.

== Childhood and early career ==
Gifford was born in Greenfield, New York, the fourth of the eleven children of Quaker ironmaker Elihu Gifford and Eliza Robinson Starbuck. He spent his childhood in Hudson, New York, and entered Brown University in 1842. He left college after his sophomore year, and moved to New York City in 1845 to study art. He studied drawing, perspective and anatomy under the British watercolorist and drawing-master, John Rubens Smith, and took drawing classes at the National Academy of Design. He also studied the human figure in anatomy classes at the Crosby Street Medical College.

Although trained as a portrait painter, the first work Gifford exhibited at the National Academy was a landscape, in 1847. Thereafter, Gifford devoted himself primarily to landscape painting, becoming one of the finest artists of the Hudson River School. He was elected an Associate of the National Academy in 1851, and an Academician in 1854.

== Gifford's travels ==
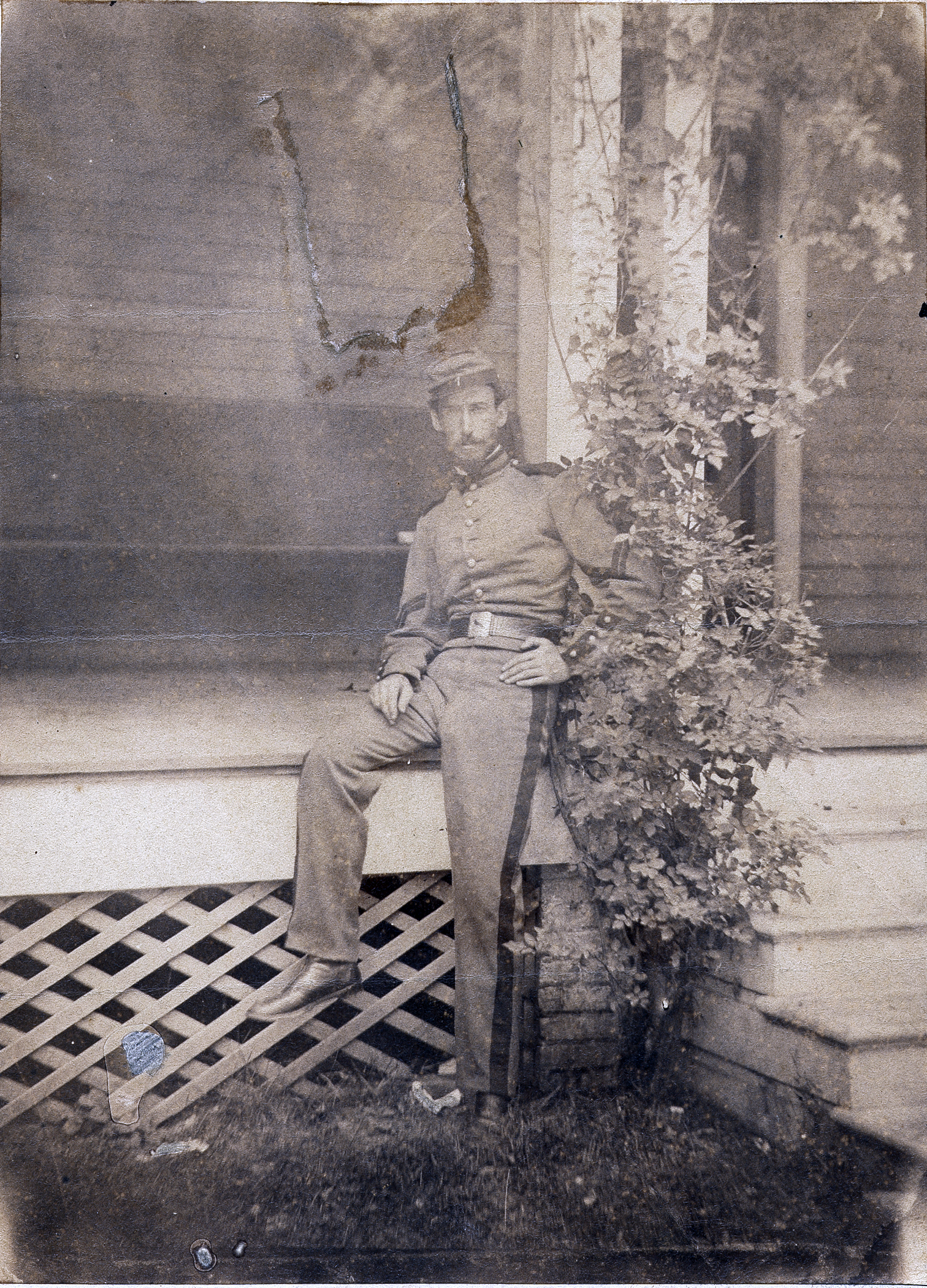
Gifford in uniform (1861), Archives of American Art

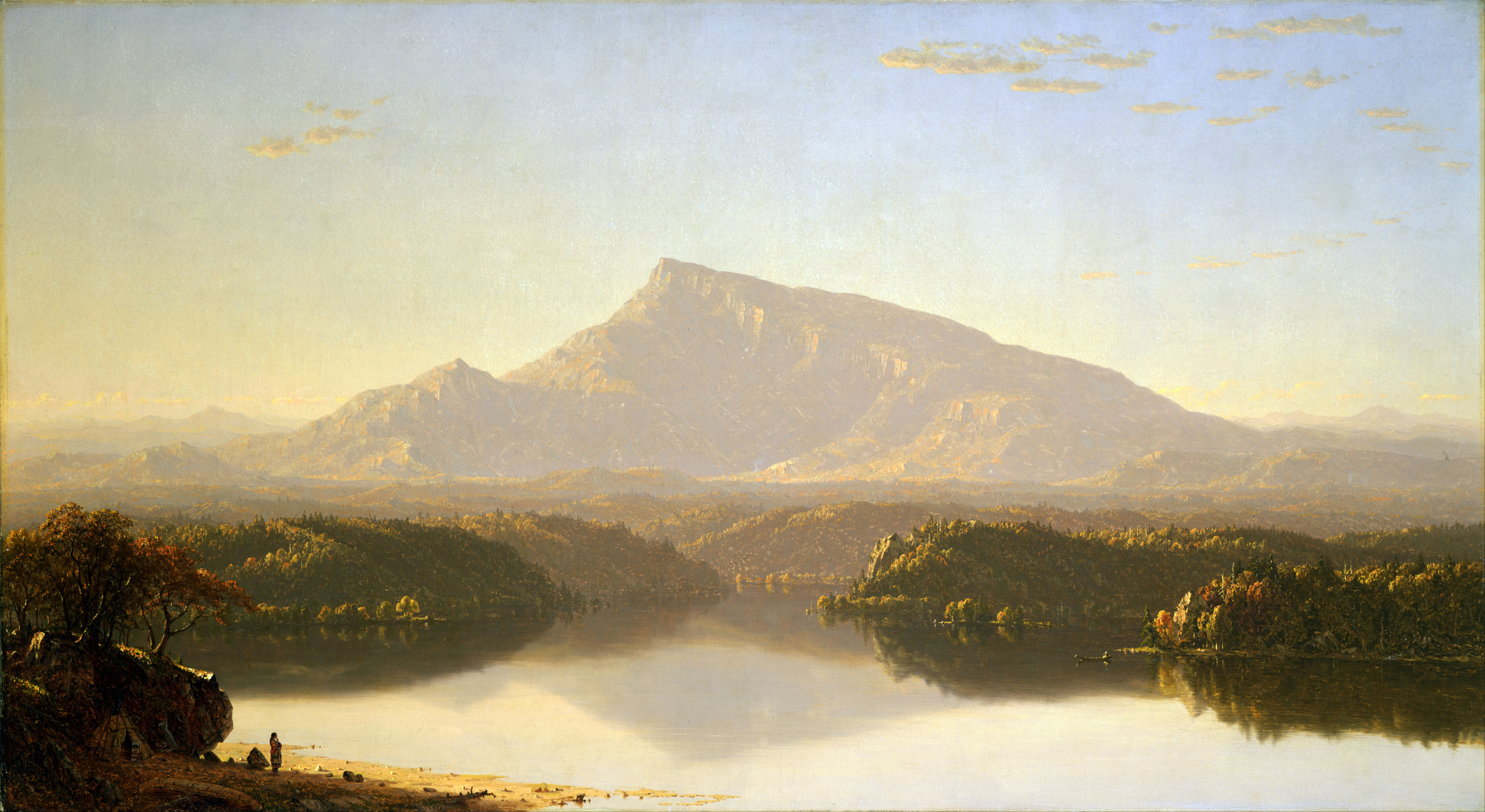
The Wilderness (1860), Toledo Museum of Art

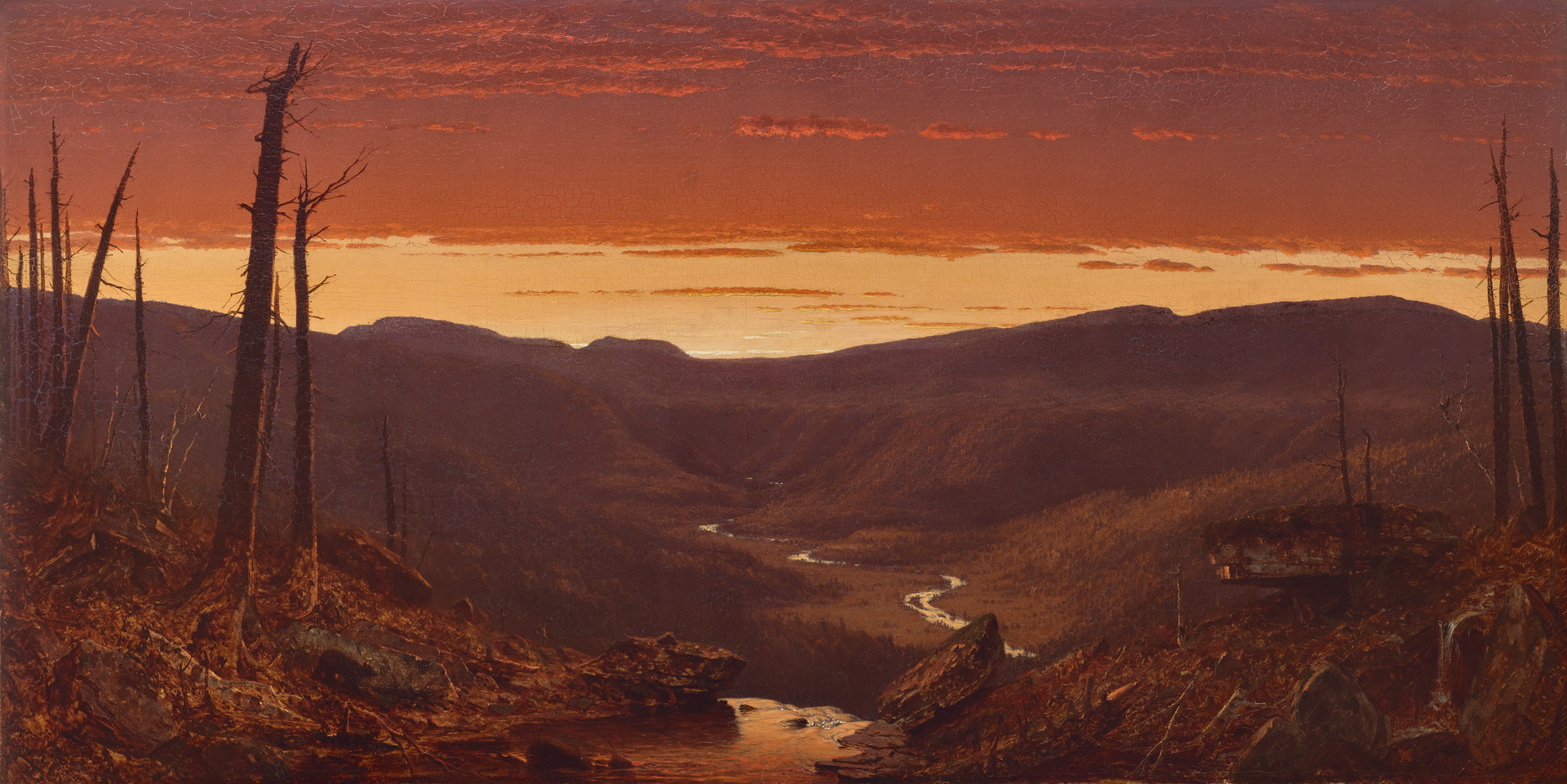
Twilight in the Catskills (1861), Yale University Art Gallery

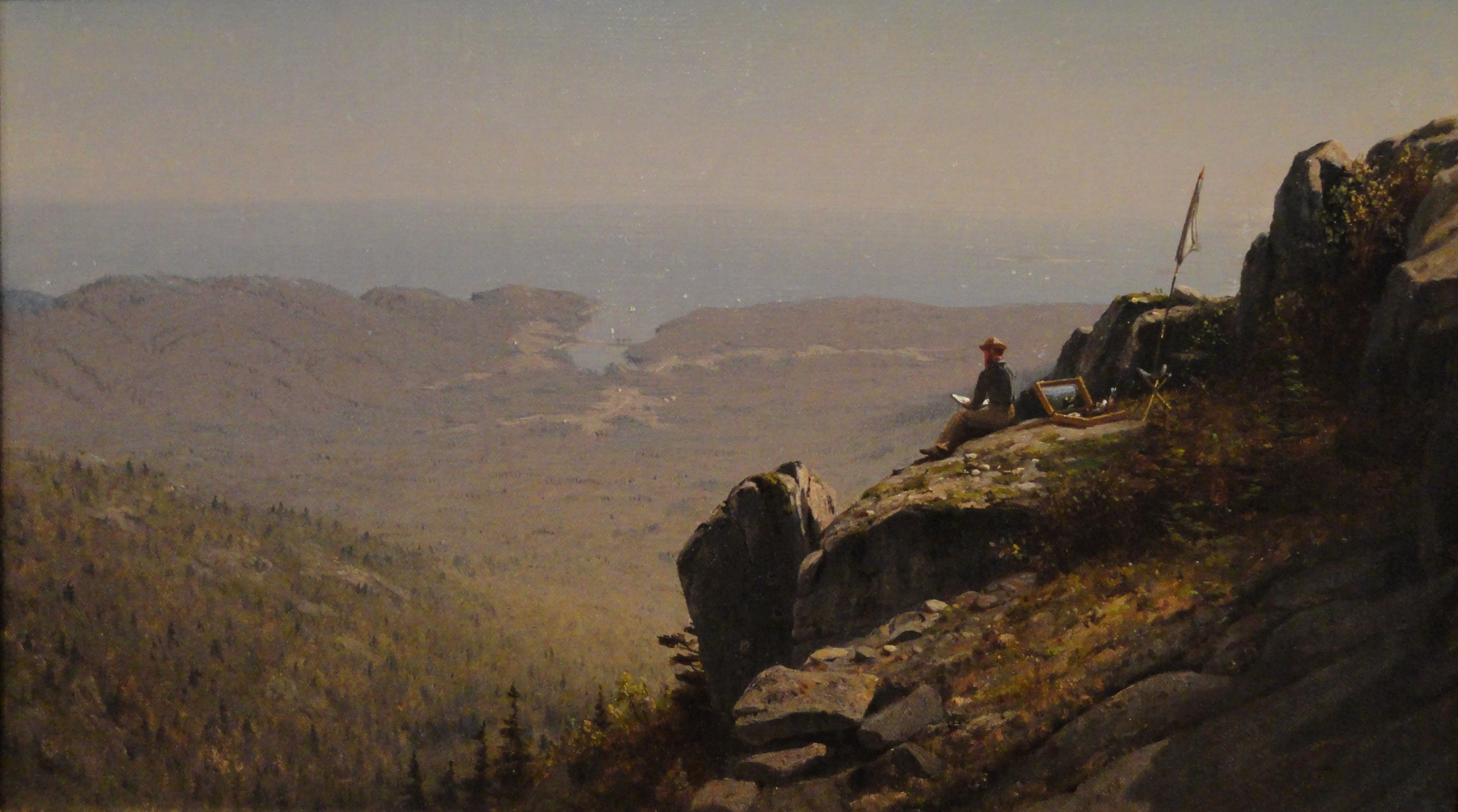
The Artist Sketching at Mount Desert, Maine (1864-1865), National Gallery of Art

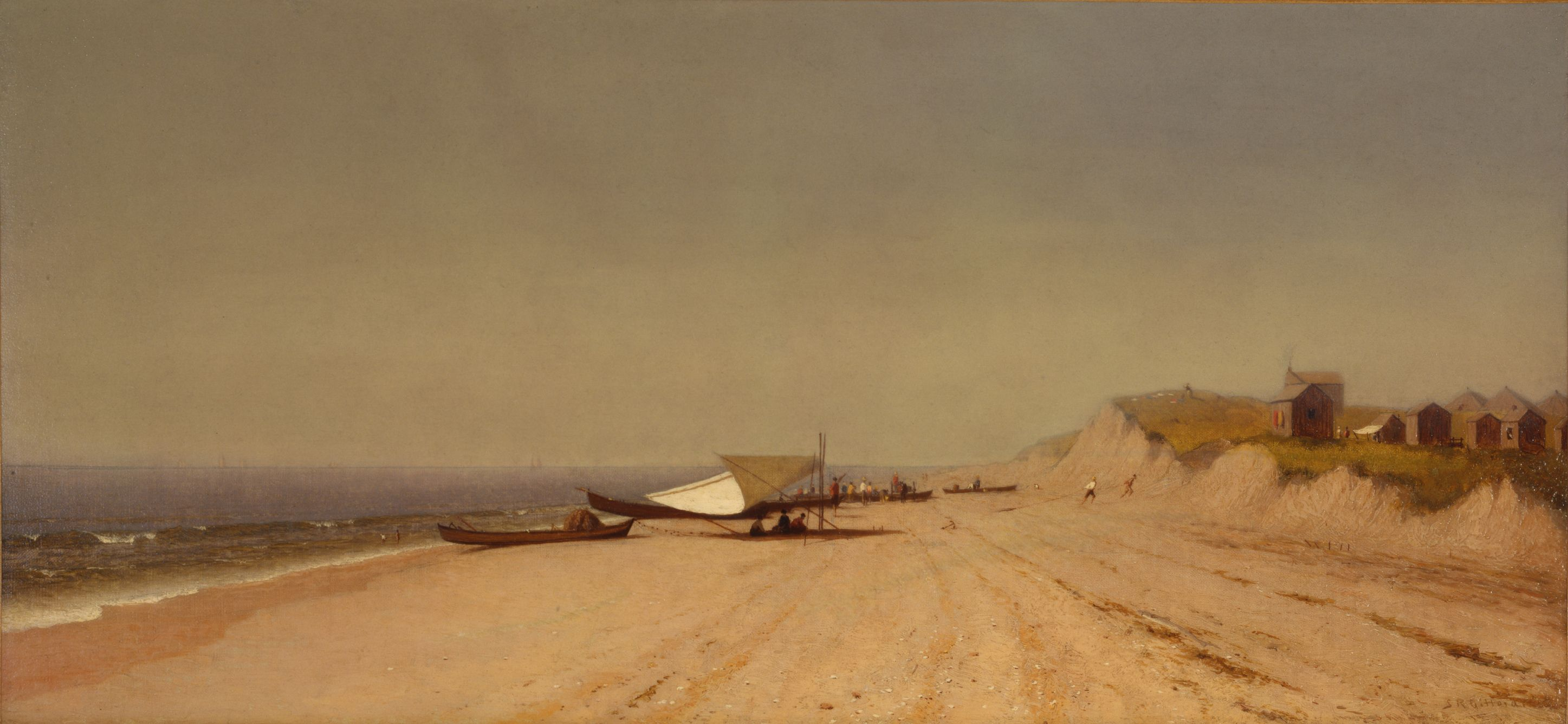
Long Branch Beach (1867), Palmer Museum of Art, Pennsylvania State University

Like most Hudson River School artists, Gifford traveled extensively to find scenic landscapes to sketch and paint. In addition to exploring New England, upstate New York and New Jersey, Gifford made extensive trips abroad. He first traveled to Europe from 1855 to 1857, to study European art and sketch subjects for future paintings. During this trip Gifford also met and traveled extensively with Albert Bierstadt and Worthington Whittredge.

In 1858, he traveled to Mount Mansfield, Vermont's tallest mountain, with his friend and fellow painter Jerome Thompson. Sketches made during their visit were published in the magazine Home Journal. Gifford painted some 20 paintings from the Vermont sketches. Of these, Mount Mansfield (1858) was his primary work, exhibited at the National Academy of Design in 1859. Thompson also exhibited a painting of Mount Mansfield in same exhibition, Belated Party on Mansfield Mountain. Thompson's work is now owned by the Metropolitan Museum of Art. (See "2008 NAD controversy," below.)

Gifford served as a corporal in the 7th Regiment of the New York Militia during the Civil War, guarding Washington, D.C., and Baltimore, 1861-1863. A few of his canvases belonging to New York City's Seventh Regiment and the Union League Club of New York are testament to this troubled time.

During the summer of 1867, Gifford spent most of his time painting on the New Jersey coast, specifically at Sandy Hook and Long Branch, according to an auction Website. The Mouth of the Shrewsbury River, one noted canvas from the period, is a dramatic scene depicting a series of telegraph poles extending into an atmospheric distance underneath ominous storm clouds.

Another journey, this time with Jervis McEntee and his wife, took him across Europe in 1868. Leaving the McEntees behind, Gifford traveled to the Middle East, including Egypt in 1869. Then in the summer of 1870 Gifford ventured to the Rocky Mountains in the western United States, this time with Worthington Whittredge and John Frederick Kensett. At least part of the 1870 travels were as part of a Hayden Expedition, led by Ferdinand Vandeveer Hayden.

=== Method ===
Mr. Gifford's method is this: When he sees anything which vividly impresses him, and which therefore he wishes to reproduce, he makes a little sketch of it in pencil on a card about as large as an ordinary visiting-card. It takes him, say, half a minute to make it; there is the idea of the future picture fixed as firmly if not as fully as the completed work itself. While traveling, he can in this way lay up a good stock of material for future use. The next step is to make a larger sketch, this time in oil, where what has already been done in black-and-white is repeated in color. To this sketch, which is about twelve inches by eight, he devotes an hour or two. It serves the purpose of defining to him just what he wants to do. He experiments with it; puts in or leaves out, according as he finds that he can increase or perfect his idea. When satisfactorily finished, it is a model of what he proposes to do.
He is now ready to paint the picture itself. When the day comes, he begins work just after sunrise, and continues until just before sunset. Ten, eleven, twelve consecutive hours, according to the season of the year, are occupied in the first great effort to put the scene on canvas. He feels fresh and eager. His studio-door is locked. Nothing is allowed to interrupt him.
When the long day is finished and the picture is produced, the work of criticism, of correction, of completion, is in place. Mr. Gifford does this work slowly. He likes to keep his picture in his studio as long as possible. Sometimes he does not touch the canvas for months after his first criticisms have been executed. Then, suddenly, he sees something that will help it along. I remember hearing him say one day, in his studio: "I thought that picture was done half a dozen times. It certainly might have been called finished six months ago. I was working at it all day yesterday." But one limitation should be noted here. Mr. Gifford does not experiment with his paintings. He does not make a change in one of them unless he knows precisely what he wishes to do. When Mr. Gifford is done, he stops. And he knows when he is done. Yet, on the other hand, he would rather take the risk of destroying a picture than to feel the slightest doubt respecting any part of it. The moment of his keenest pleasure is not when his work is satisfactorily completed, but when, long beforehand, he feels that he is going to be successful with it.

Gifford would often revisit an image later, sometimes years later, painting a variation based on his sketches and own inspiration, or a patron's wishes.

Thirty-six Venice paintings, based on his 1869 drawings and studies of the city, were listed in the 1881 memorial catalogue of Gifford's works. He painted additional Venetian works, according to biographer Ila Weiss. In 1875, he wrote to a friend: "I have painted so many Venetian pictures during the last five years that I have lately declined to paint them when they have been asked for. One can't stay in Venice forever any more than one can eat partridge every day." In the same letter, he wrote about his commission fees: "The price of such a picture the size of the [Fishing Boats Entering the Harbor of] Brindisi is $1600 without the frame. That is the price I received for the Brindisi, [Lake] Geneva, and [Mount] Renier [sic] [- Bay of Tacoma].

=== "Chief pictures" ===
Gifford enclosed "A List of Some of My Chief Pictures" in a November 6, 1874 letter to Octavius Brooks Frothingham. He updated that list in 1880. Many of these works were characterized by a hazy atmosphere with soft, suffused sunlight. He often painted a large body of water in the foreground or middle distance, in which the distant landscape would be gently reflected.

== Death and legacy ==
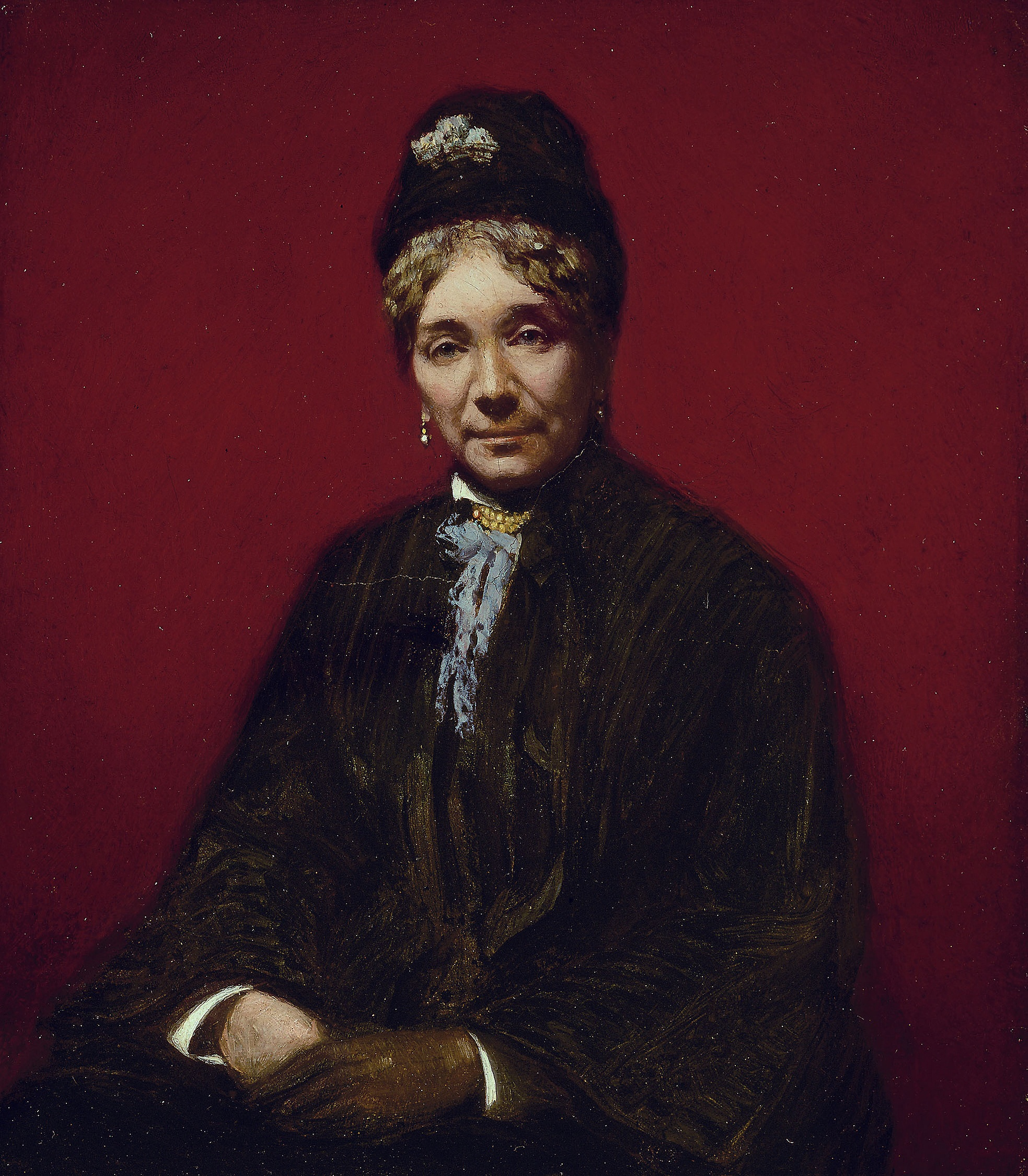
Portrait of Mary Cecilia Gifford (1878), Art Institute of Chicago

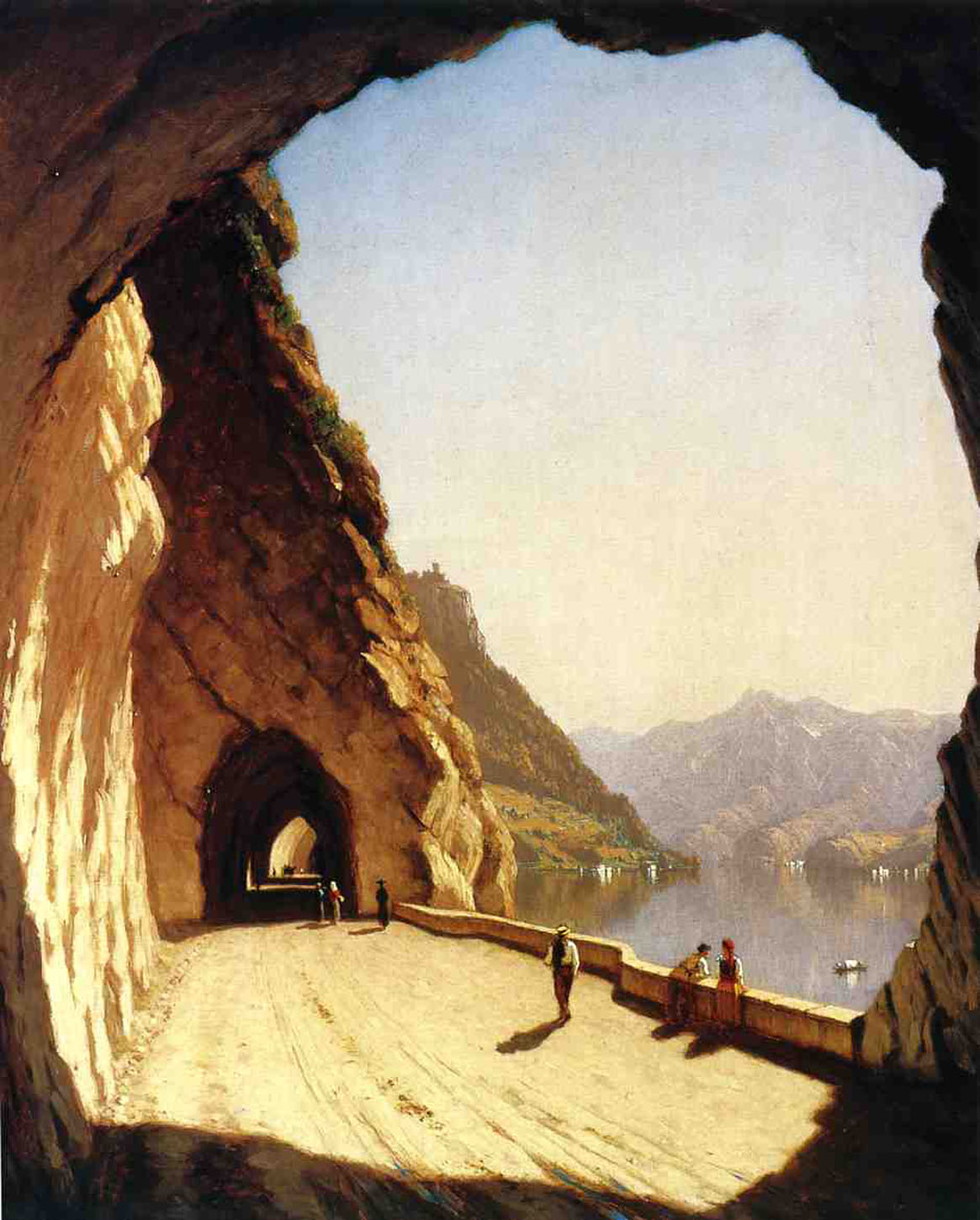
Galleries of the Stelvio, Lake Como (1878), Munson-Williams-Proctor Art Institute

In June 1877, at age 53, Gifford married Mary Cecilia Canfield (1824-1887), the widow of a friend. They had no children.

On August 29, 1880, Gifford died in New York City, after having been diagnosed with malarial fever. That autumn, the Metropolitan Museum of Art organized a memorial exhibition of 160 of his works.

The Gifford collection comprises nearly 70 pictures, and enough studies for pictures to bring the total up to 160 numbers. It occupies the entire west gallery. While the limited time allowed for the formation of the collection and the inconvenient season for securing loans prevented that completeness of representation which was desired, yet enough has been gathered to exhibit successfully the extent, the beauty, and the real power of Mr. Gifford's work, as well as its defects and limitations. Among the more important pictures that are displayed may be noted Twilight in the Wilderness (1861), Kauterskill Clove (1863), Mansfield Mountain (1868), The Mouth of the Shrewsbury (1868), Sta. Maria della Salute (1870), Tivoli (1870), San Giorgio (1870), A Venetian Twilight (1878), The Matterhorn at Sunrise (1879), The Parthenon (1880), and Venice (1880).

The following year, MMA published a catalog of his works, which listed 734 paintings and featured an appraisal of his work by his friend, John F. Weir of Yale University:

Mr. S. R. Gifford was represented [at the 1876 Centennial Exposition] by his Sunrise on the Sea-Shore, of which it may be said that the sea and its solitude has seldom inspired a more profound motive, or one more adequately rendered, than this picture. Tivoli and Lake Geneva are no less admirable, but with a very distinct sentiment, and Pallanza, Lago Maggiore has a full-blooded sense of light, modified by tone that is in every respect masterly in treatment. Two pictures by the same artist, Fishing-Boats of the Adriatic and San Giorgio, Venice, are as strong and pronounced in color as the former works are delicate and suggestive. The artist is varied in his powers, and sustained, free, and finished in his methods. His pictures always manifest great elevation of thought and feeling. They are the interpretation of the profound sentiments of Nature rather than of her superficial aspects.

Two-hundred-ninety-four of Gifford's paintings were to be auctioned at Madison Square Garden in two sessions. Part 1 went off without a hitch, but Part 2 had a tragic end.

The same lesson is also enforced by the sale of the pictures and sketches of the late Sanford R. Gifford, the most important sale, so far as American art in concerned, held in a long while. The collection consisted of 294 sketches and finished works, which were sold in two divisions, on the evenings of April 11th and 12th, and 28th and 29th, and realized an aggregate $42,200. The highest price was paid for the finished picture, The Ruins of the Parthenon, which was bought for the Corcoran Gallery of Art, at Washington, for $5,100.

The preview for the second session, on the evening of April 21, was advertised as a benefit for New York City's Hahnemann Hospital. The crowd was larger than anticipated, and with some 800 people packed into the building, the floor of the ballroom collapsed, in what became known as the Madison Square Garden disaster. Five people were killed and twenty-two were injured.

Between 1955 and 1973, Gifford's heirs donated the artist's letters and personal papers to the Archives of American Art, at the Smithsonian Institution. In 2007, these papers were digitally scanned in their entirety and made available to researchers as the Sanford Robinson Gifford Papers Online. Twenty-four of Gifford's sketchbooks survive, and are in the collections of Yale University, the Brooklyn Museum, Vassar College, and elsewhere.

== 2008 National Academy of Design controversy ==
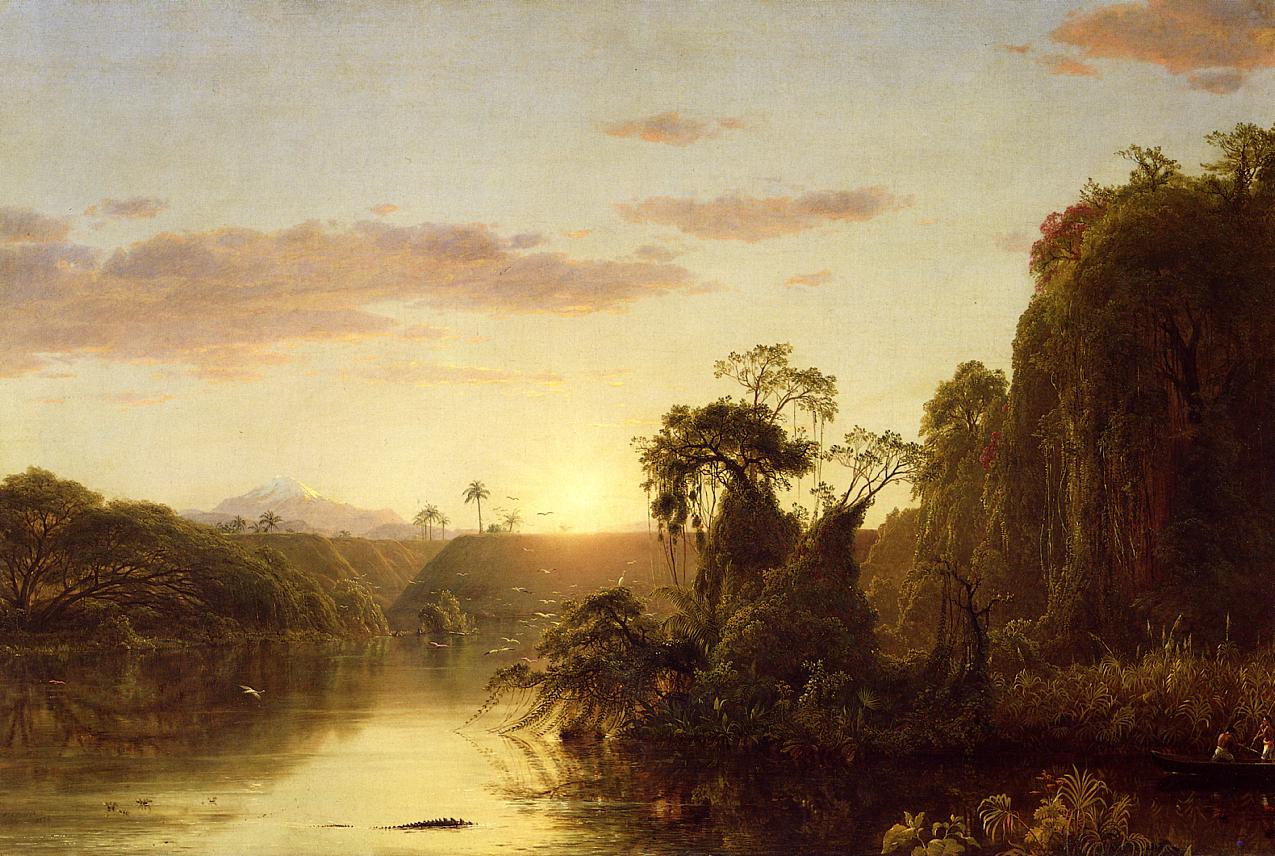
Frederic Edwin Church, Scene on the Magdalena (1854), private collection

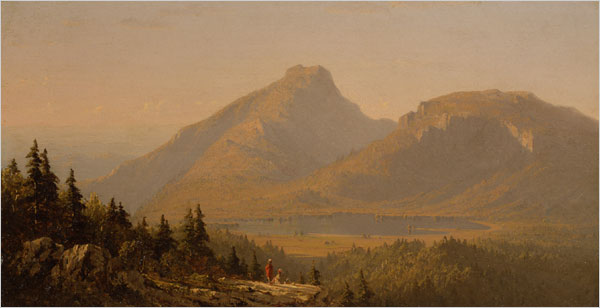
Sanford Robinson Gifford, Mount Mansfield, Vermont (1859), private collection

In December 2008, one of Gifford's paintings, Mount Mansfield, Vermont (1859), became part of a controversy over deaccessioning by the National Academy of Design. The Academy was a member of the Association of Art Museum Directors, whose policy stated that member museums could not sell works of art to cover operating expenses, only to purchase superior works or to weed out inferior or redundant ones. Prior to joining AAMD, the Academy had sold two Thomas Eakins works (including his "diploma painting," Wrestlers) in the 1970s, and Richard Caton Woodville's War News from Mexico (1848) in 1994. According to its former curator, David Dearinger: "When the Academy later applied to the museum association for accreditation, Mr. Dearinger recalled, it was asked about the Woodville sale and promised not to repeat such a move."

In a 2008 sale, the Academy quietly sold Frederic Edwin Church‘s Scene on the Magdalene (1854) and Sanford Gifford's Mount Mansfield, Vermont (1859) to a private collector for US$13.5 million. The former was the Academy's only painting by Church; the latter was its only painting by Gifford. Both had been "donated to the Academy in 1865 by another painter, James Augustus Suydam." News of the sale was broken by arts blogger Lee Rosenbaum. As punishment for these actions, AAMD asked its other member museums to "cease lending artworks to the Academy and collaborating with it on exhibitions." The Academy had contemplated selling additional paintings, but those plans were abandoned after being reported by Rosenbaum.

== Selected works ==
NOTE: Gifford's "Chief Pictures" are listed in bold.

=== Europe ===
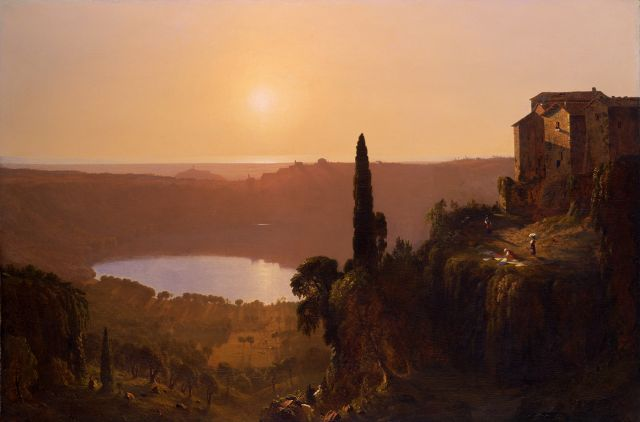
Lake Nemi (1856-1857), Toledo Museum of Art

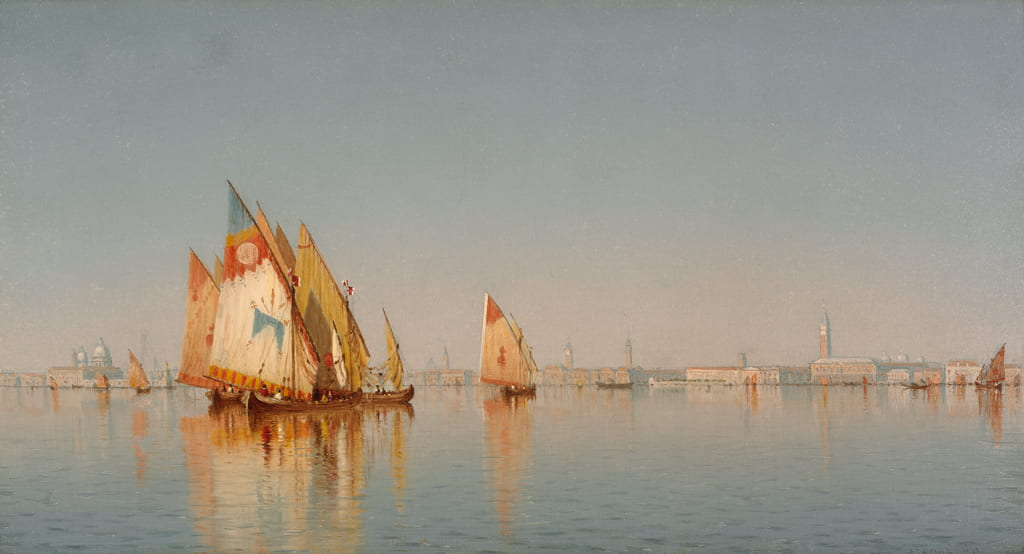
Venetian Sails, A Study (1873), Washington University Museum of Art, St. Louis

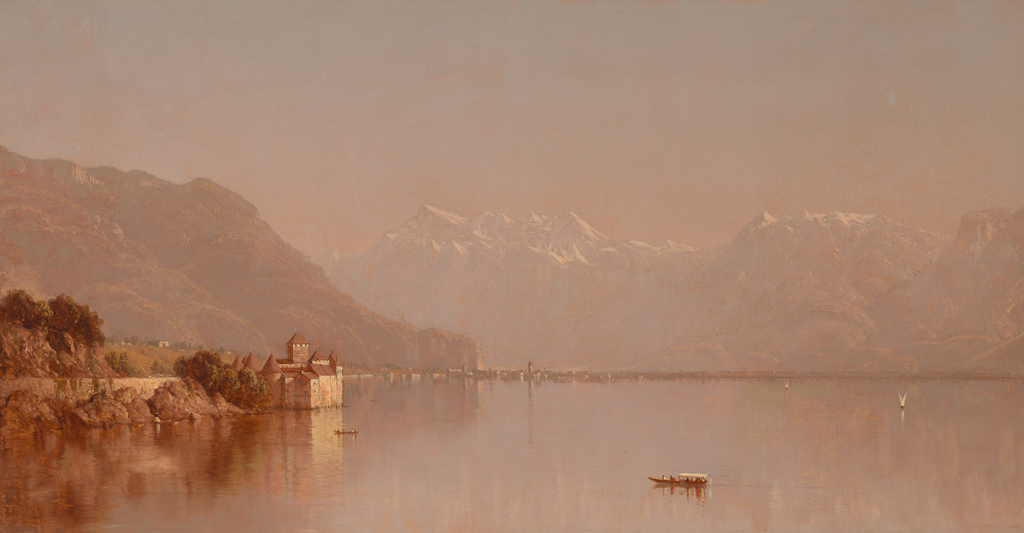
Lake Geneva (1875), Rhode Island School of Design Museum

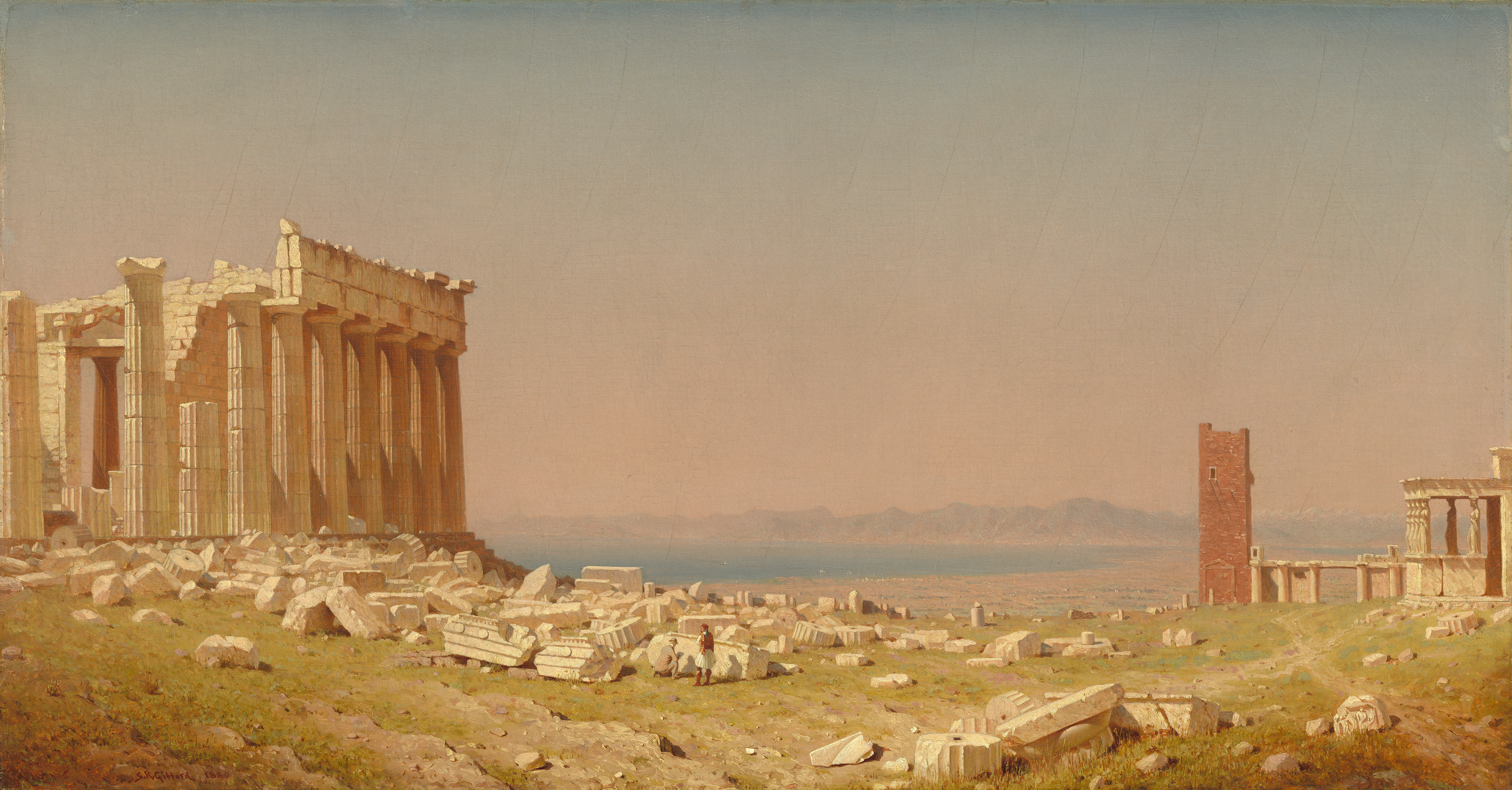
Ruins of the Parthenon (1880), National Gallery of Art

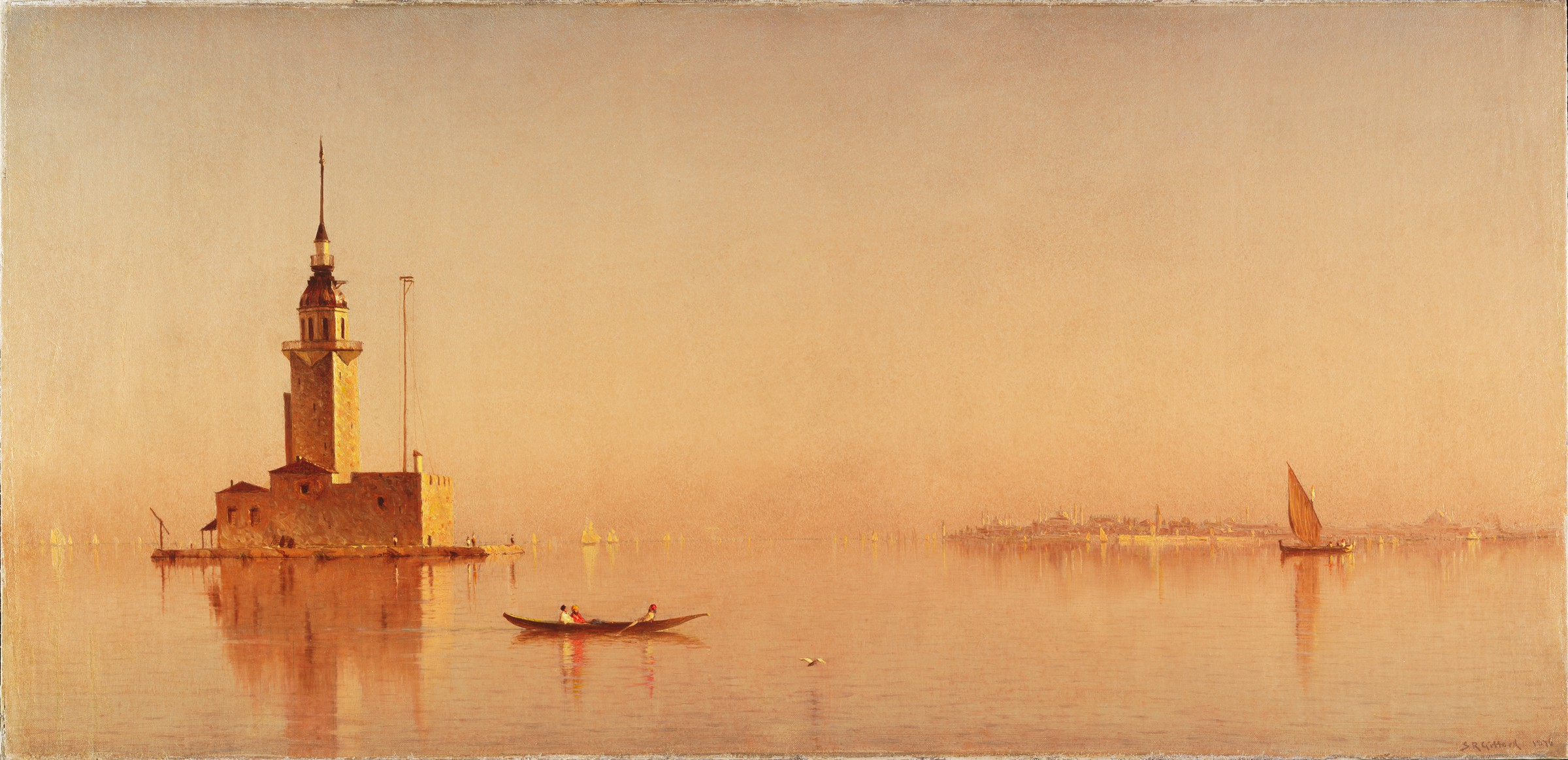
Leander's Tower on the Bosphorus (1876), Fogg Museum, Harvard University

- Derwentwater (c.1856), Brooklyn Museum of Art
- **Lake Nemi** (1856–57), Toledo Museum of Art, Toledo, Ohio
- Saint Peter's from Pincian Hill (1865), Pennsylvania Academy of the Fine Arts
- Monte Ferro - Lago Maggiore (1868), private collection. Exhibited at the 1876 Centennial Exposition, Philadelphia.
- **The Lagoons of Venice** (1869), March-Billings-Rockefeller National Historical Park, Woodstock, Vermont
  - related: **Venetian Sails** (1873), unlocated. Painted for John Jacob Astor. Exhibited at National Academy of Design, 1874.
  - related: Venetian Sails, A Study (1873), Washington University Museum of Art, St. Louis
- **Fishing Boats of the Adriatic** (1869). Exhibited at the 1876 Centennial Exposition, Philadelphia.
- **Pallanza, Lago Maggiore** (1869), private collection. Exhibited at the 1876 Centennial Exposition, Philadelphia.
- **San Giorgio, Venice** (circa 1869), unlocated. Exhibited at the 1876 Centennial Exposition, Philadelphia. Exhibited at the 1878 Paris Salon.
  - related: Venice, San Giorgio Maggiore (1870), Loeb Art Center, Vassar College, Poughkeepsie, New York.
- **Tivoli** (1870), Metropolitan Museum of Art. Commissioned by Robert Gordon. Exhibited at the National Academy of Design in 1870. (Note: "On the north side of the room hangs Mr. S. R. Gifford's Tivoli, No. 340. It represents the well-known valley, with a pile of buildings on the left, and a small stream running down the center. The valley is bathed in a glow of golden sunlight. The picture is specially noticeable for its fine tone, the wonderful atmospheric effects which have been introduced, and its admirable perspective. Quite in a different style to this is No. 376, Mount Hood and the Dalles, Columbia River, Oregon, by the same artist. It is painted with all Mr. Gifford's usual careful attention to detail. The mountain in the distance is particularly fine.) Exhibited at the 1876 Centennial Exposition, Philadelphia.
  - related: A View near Tivoli (1872), private collection
- Isola Bella in Lago Maggiore (1871), Metropolitan Museum of Art
  - related: Lago Maggiore (1854), Loeb Art Center, Vassar College, Poughkeepsie, New York
  - related: Lake Maggiore, Italy (1858), New-York Historical Society
- Santa Maria della Salute, Venice (1871). Exhibited at the 1876 Centennial Exposition, Philadelphia.
- Schloss Rheinstein (1872), Washington University Art Museum, St. Louis.
- Fishing Boats Entering the Harbor at Brindisi (c.1874)
- On the Lake of Geneva, near Villeneuve, with the Alps (1875), Rhode Island School of Design. Exhibited at the 1876 Centennial Exposition, Philadelphia.
- **A Venetian Twilight** (1878), private collection
- **Galleries of the Stelvio, Lake Como** (1878), Munson-Williams-Proctor Art Institute, Utica, New York
  - related: Sketch of Stelvio Road, Como (dated Aug. 6, 1868), Thyssen-Bornemisza Museum, Madrid, Spain
- Villa Malta, Rome (1879), Smithsonian American Art Museum
- The Matterhorn at Sunrise (1879), 40" x 28", private collection. (Note: "His painting of the Matterhorn towering into the blue, smitten by the glow of the setting sun, is, it not too much to say, one of the noblest attempts at mountain painting ever undertaken by an American artist. We know not which most to admire, the firmness of the technique, the purity of the atmospheric tints, or the superb manner in which the outlines of the stupendous obelisk of th Alps have been chiselled against the heavens.) Purchased by George C. Clark for $950 at the posthumous April 11 & 12, 1881 auction of Gifford's paintings. Photos and sketches of SRG's visit to the Matterhorn are available via the Smithsonian Web site.
- **Ruins of the Parthenon** (1880), National Gallery of Art, Washington, D.C. Purchased for the Corcoran Gallery of Art for $5,100 at the posthumous April 11 & 12, 1881 auction of Gifford's paintings, an auction record for the artist.
  - related: The Parthenon (1869), Middlebury College Museum of Art, Vermont
- **Venice** (1880), unlocated. Exhibited at the Brooklyn Art Association, 1880
- The Golden Horn (1873). Exhibited at the 1876 Centennial Exposition, Philadelphia. The Golden Horn was a ship in Constantinople harbor.
  - related: Constantinople from The Golden Horn (1880), Munson-Williams-Proctor Art Institute, Utica, New York

=== Middle East ===
- **On the Nile** (1871), Detroit Institute of Arts. Exhibited at the 1876 Centennial Exposition, Philadelphia.
  - related: Gebel Haridi, on the Nile (1868), Loeb Art Center, Vassar College, Poughkeepsie, New York
  - related: A Sketch of the Nile (1869), private collection
  - related: On the Nile, Gebel Sheikh Hereedee (1872), private collection
- **Siout, Egypt** (1874), National Gallery of Art Exhibited at the 1876 Centennial Exposition, Philadelphia.
  - related: Siout, Capital of Upper Egypt (1869), private collection
- **Leander's Tower on the Bosphorus** (1876), Fogg Museum, Harvard University

=== United States ===
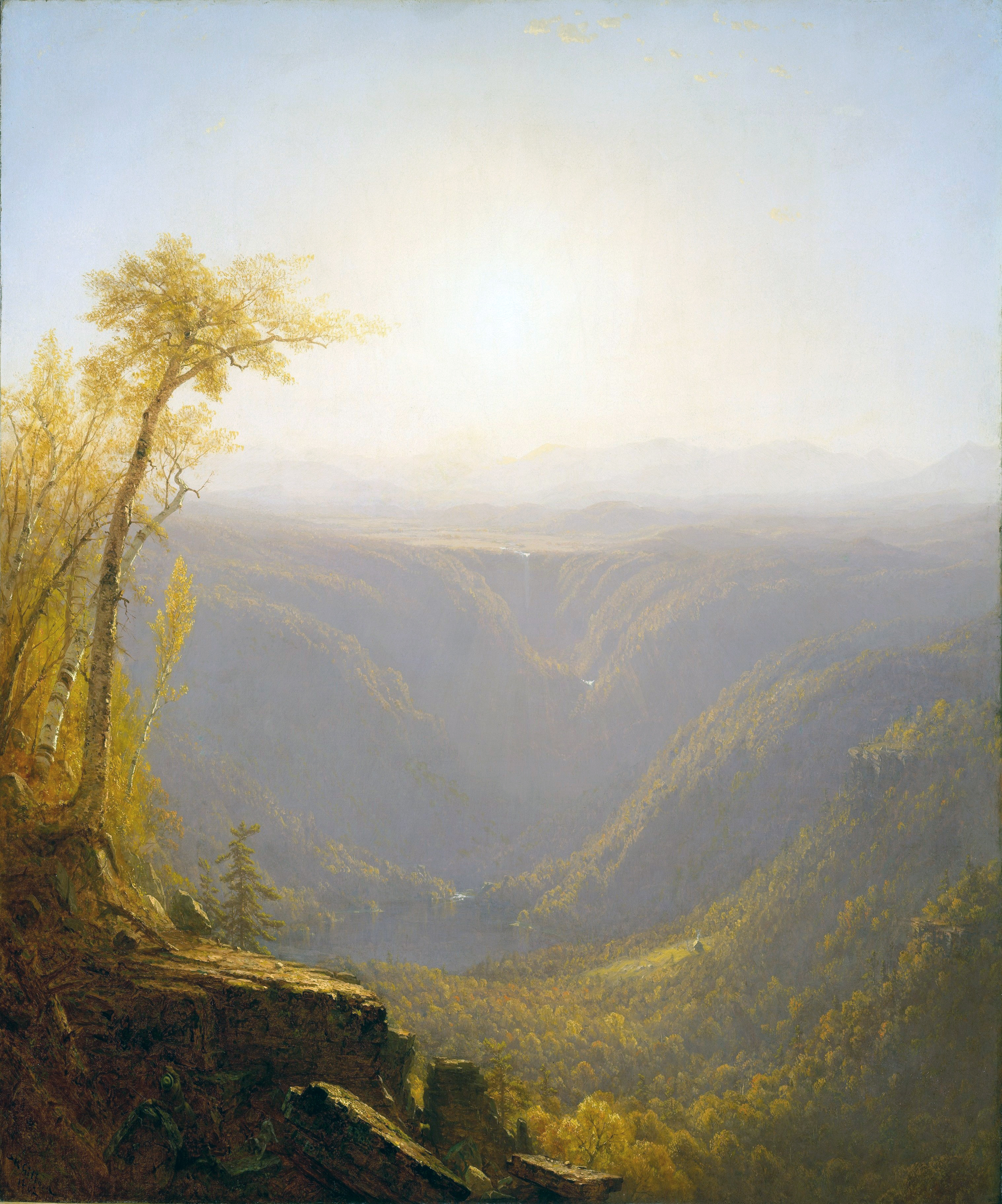
A Gorge In The Mountains - Kauterskill Falls (1862), Metropolitan Museum of Art

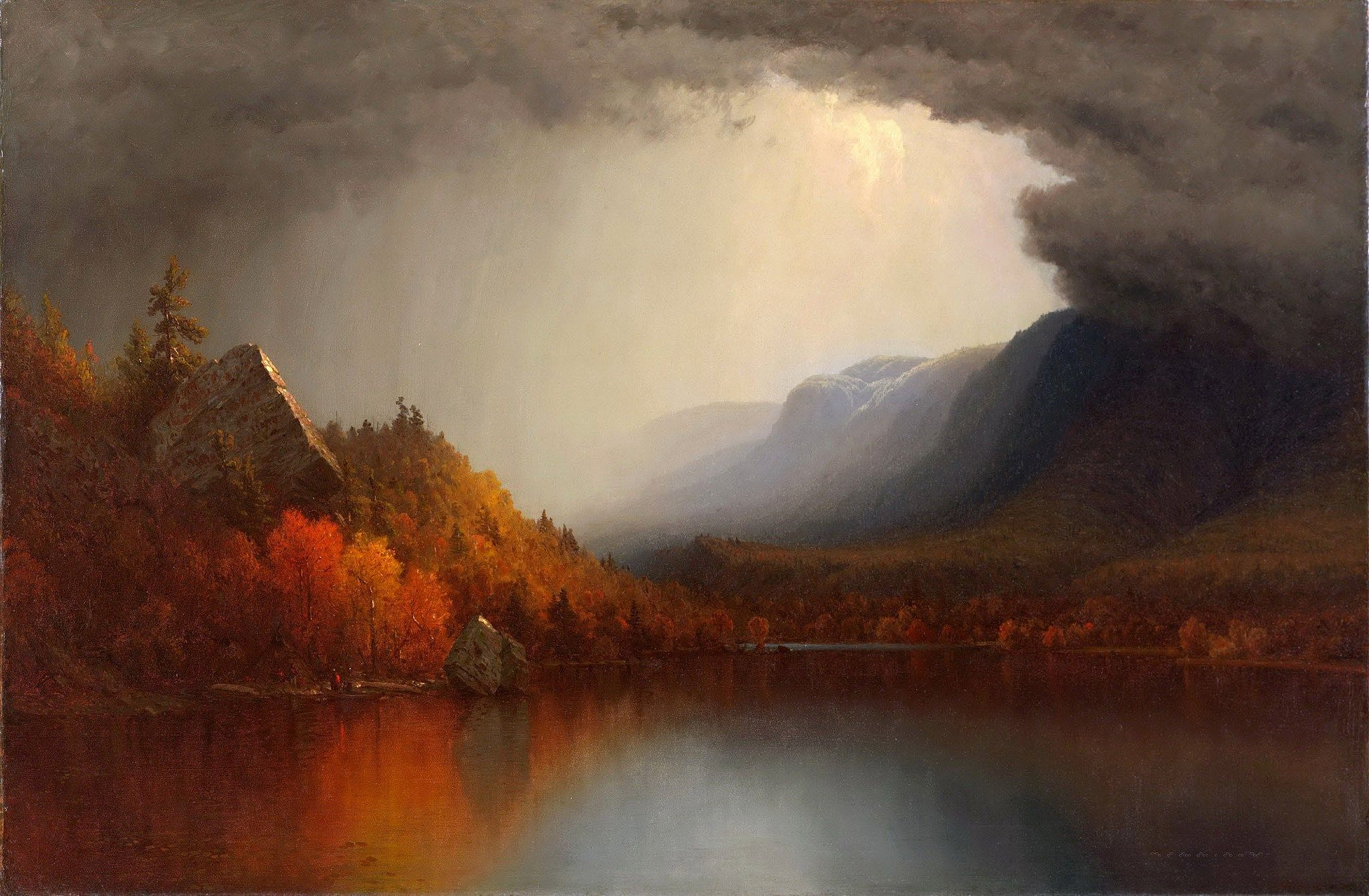
A Coming Storm (1863/1880), Philadelphia Museum of Art

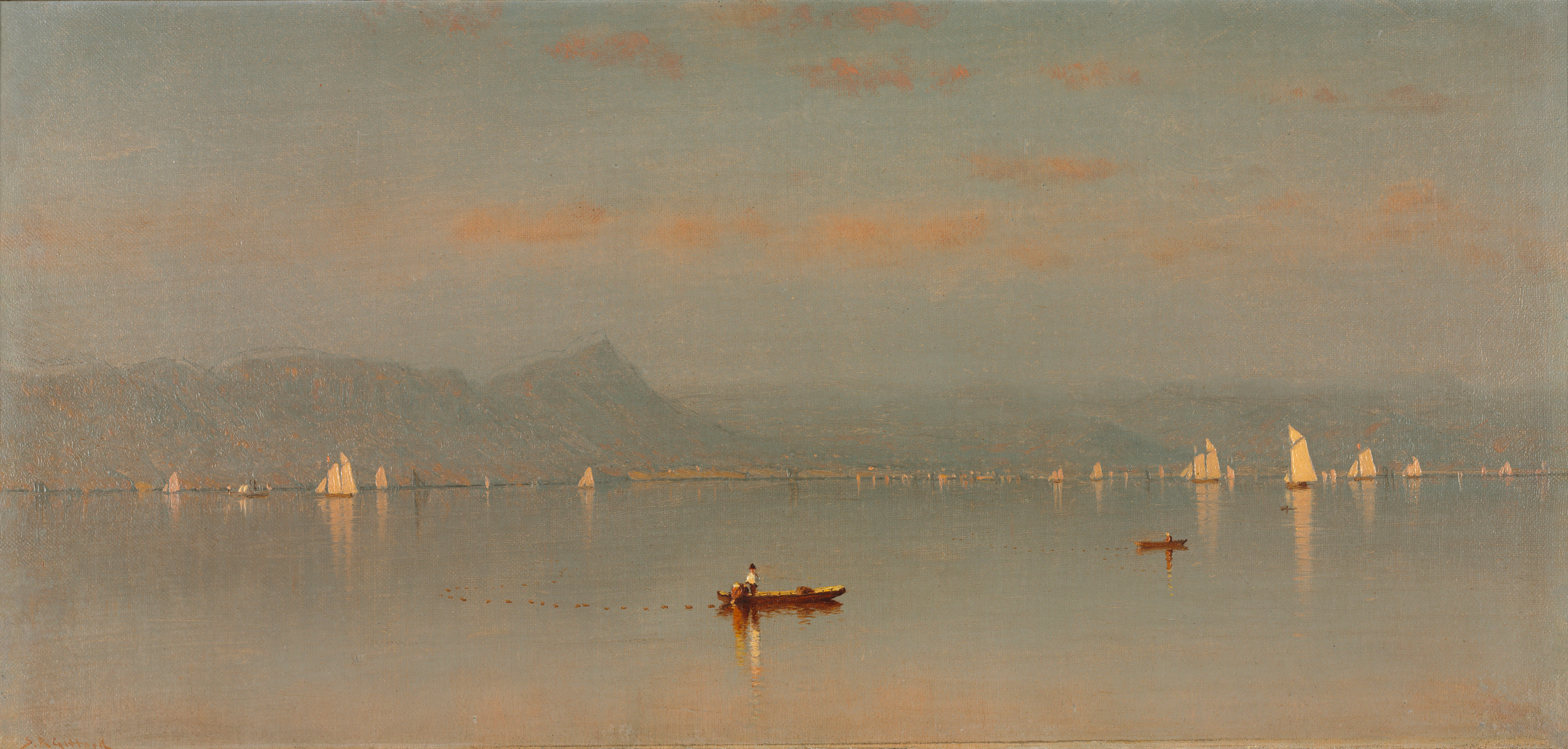
Haverstraw Bay (1866), Cleveland Museum of Art

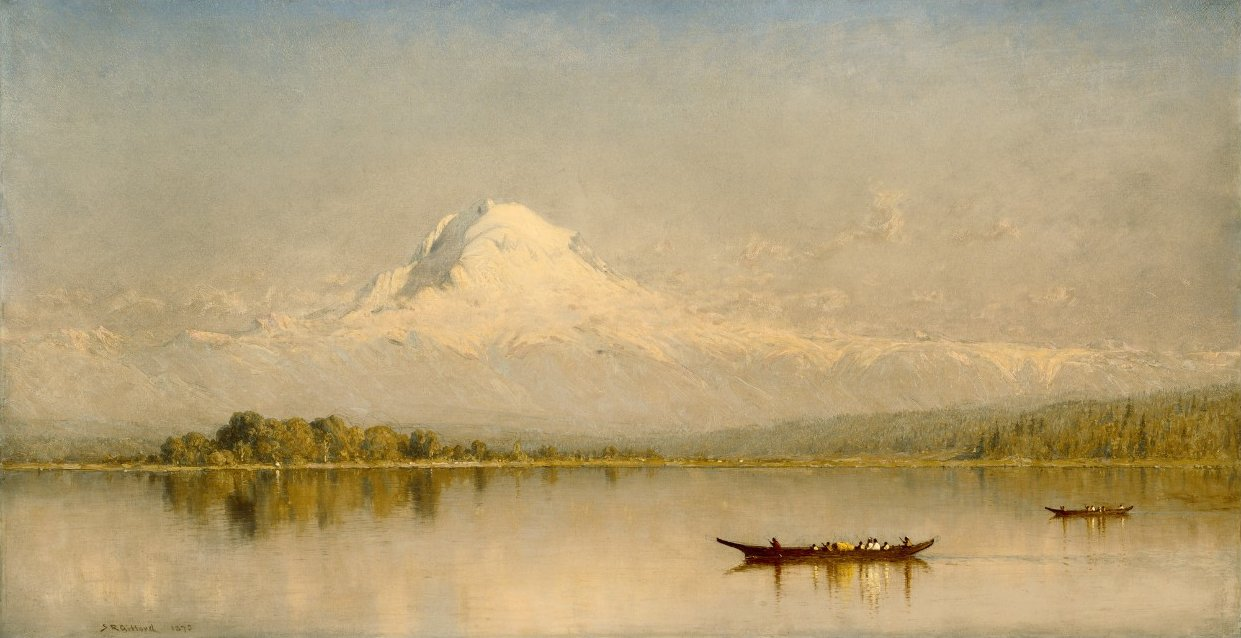
Mount Rainier, Bay of Tacoma – Puget Sound (1875), Seattle Art Museum

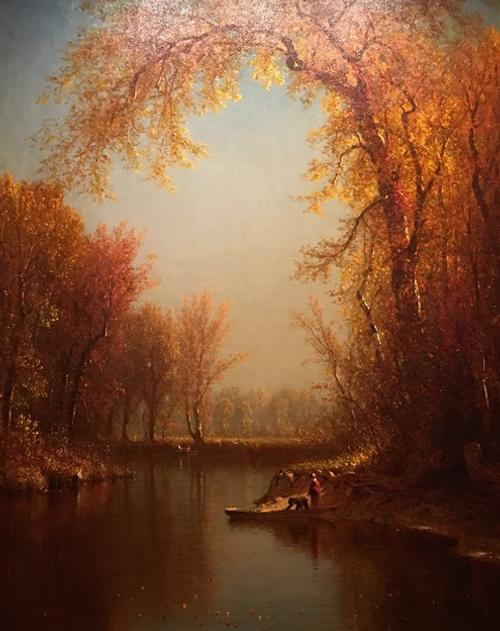
An Indian Summer Day on the Claverack Creek (1877), Metropolitan Museum of Art

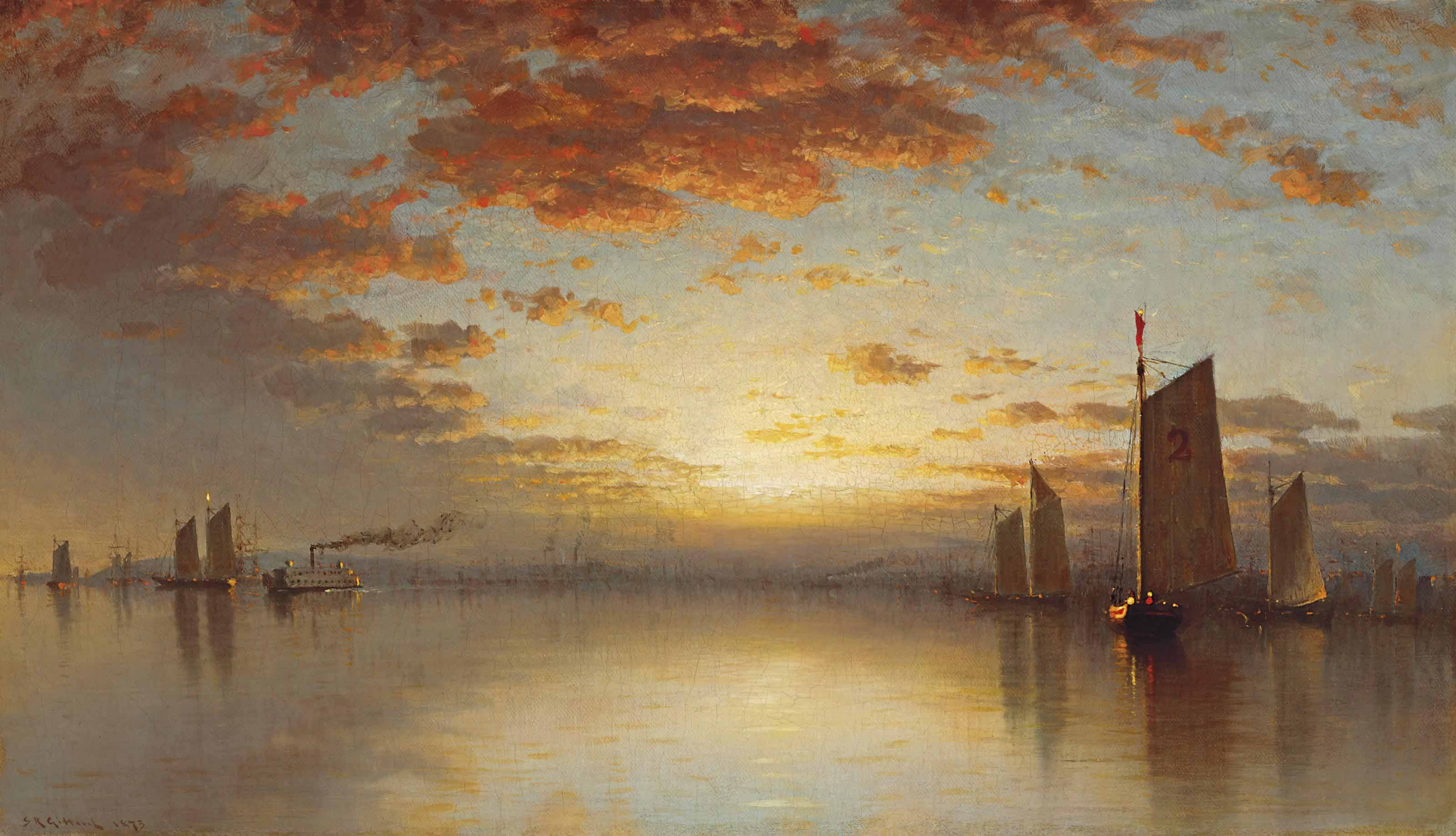
Sunset over New York Bay (c.1878), private collection

- Morning in the Adirondacks (1854), oval canvas, 41" x 36", Westervelt-Warner collection, Tuscaloosa, Alabama
- Sunset in the Shawangunk Mountains (1854), oval canvas, 41" x 36", Westervelt-Warner collection, Tuscaloosa, Alabama
- **Mount Mansfield** (1858), Manoogian collection (on loan to Detroit Institute of Arts)
  - related: Sketch for Mount Mansfield (1858), Springfield Museums, Massachusetts
- Mount Mansfield, Vermont (1859), private collection. Deaccessioned by National Academy of Design, 2008
- Early October in the White Mountains (1860), Washington University Art Gallery, St. Louis
  - related: Mount Washington from the Saco River (1858), High Museum of Art, Atlanta
  - related: Indian Summer in the White Mountains (Mount Washington from the Saco) (1862), Mint Museum of Art, Charlotte, North Carolina
  - related: The White Mountains (Mount Washington from the Saco) (1871), New Britain Museum of American Art
- **The Wilderness** (1860), Toledo Museum of Art, Toledo, Ohio
  - related: The Wilderness (1861), private collection
  - related: Lake Scene - Mountain Background (1861), Addison Gallery of American Art
- Twilight in the Catskills (1861), Yale University Art Gallery
- **A Gorge in the Mountains (Kauterskill Falls)** (1862), Metropolitan Museum of Art
  - related: October in the Catskills (1880), Los Angeles County Museum of Art
  - related: Kauterskill Clove, Catskill Mountains (1880), Art Institute of Chicago
- The Catskill Mountain House (1862), private collection. Purchased by E. H. Gordon for $505 at the posthumous April 11 & 12, 1881 auction of Gifford's paintings.
- On the Bronx River (1862). Exhibited at 1876 Centennial, Philadelphia. Sold for $310 at the posthumous April 11 & 12, 1881 auction of Gifford's paintings.
- A Coming Storm (1863, retouched by Gifford 1880), Philadelphia Museum of Art
  - related: A Coming Storm on Lake George (c.1863), private collection
  - related: A Coming Shower over Black Mountain, Lake George (c.1877), 18" x 34", private collection. Purchased by George C. Clark for $1,025 at the posthumous April 11 & 12, 1881 auction of Gifford's paintings.
  - A Sudden Storm, Lake George (1877), private collection.
- A View from South Mountain in the Catskills (c.1863), unlocated. Exhibited at the National Academy of Design, 1864. Sold for $300 at the posthumous April 11 & 12, 1881 auction of Gifford's paintings.
  - related: The View from South Mountain in the Catskills, A Sketch (1865), private collection
  - related: The View from South Mountain in the Catskills (1871), St. Johnsbury Athenaeum, Vermont.
  - related: Autumn in the Catskills (1871), The Parthenon, Nashville, Tennessee
  - related: Study for The View from South Mountain in the Catskills (1873), private collection
  - related: The Hudson Valley from South Mountain (1873). Sold for $215 at the posthumous April 11 & 12, 1881 auction of Gifford's paintings.
- **A Twilight in the Adirondacks** (1864), private collection. (Note: The New York Leader critic George Arnold's praise for the painting is quoted in Avery et al., pp. 167-168.) (Note: "One of the most important pictures was A Twilight in the Adirondacks, by Sanford R. Gifford. It is a lake-scene in the forest, just as the shadows of approaching night begin to creep over the landscape. The sky glows with reflected light, and this brilliant after-glow is repeated in the quiet water. In the deep shadows of the forest on the bank of the lake in the middle ground, there glows the firelight of a hunter's camp, but otherwise there is nothing in the landscape to disturb the impressive quiet of the scene.") Exhibited at the 1876 Centennial Exposition, Philadelphia.
- The Artist Sketching at Mount Desert, Maine (1864-1865), National Gallery of Art
- An October Afternoon (1865), upright composition, unlocated
  - related: **An October Afternoon** (1871), Museum of Fine Arts, Boston
- Sandy Hook (1865), Whitney Museum of American Art
- Manchester Beach, Massachusetts (1865), Thyssen-Bornemisza Collection, Madrid, Spain. Sold for $205 at the posthumous April 11 & 12, 1881 auction of Gifford's paintings.
- **A Passing Storm in the Adirondacks** (1866), Wadsworth Atheneum, Hartford, Connecticut
- Rocks at Porcupine Island, near Mount Desert (1866), Farnsworth Art Museum, Rockland, Maine. Sold for $230 at the posthumous April 11 & 12, 1881 auction of Gifford's paintings.
- A Home in the Wilderness (1866), Cleveland Museum of Art, Cleveland, Ohio. Exhibited at the 1867 Exposition Universelle in Paris.
  - related: Mountain Landscape (undated), Yale University Art Gallery
- Hunter Mountain, Twilight (1866), Terra Foundation, Chicago. Exhibited at the 1867 Exposition Universelle in Paris. This painting helped to inspire the creation of the Catskill and Adirondack Forest Preserves.
  - related: A Study of Hunter Mountain at Twilight (c.1865), private collection
- Morning in the Hudson, Haverstraw Bay (1866), Terra Foundation, Chicago
  - related: Haverstraw Bay (1868), Cleveland Museum of Art
  - related: Tappan Zee (1879-1880), private collection
- Hook Mountain, near Nyack on the Hudson (1866), Yale University Art Gallery. Sold for $300 at the posthumous April 11 & 12, 1881 auction of Gifford's paintings.
  - related: Hook Mountain on the Hudson River (1867), private collection
- Echo Lake, Franconia Notch, White Mountains (c.1866), Adirondack Museum, Blue Mountain Lake, New York. Sold for $215 at the posthumous April 11 & 12, 1881 auction of Gifford's paintings.
- **Sunrise on the Sea-Shore** (1867), unlocated. Exhibited at the 1876 Centennial Exposition, Philadelphia. Sold for $305 at the posthumous April 11 & 12, 1881 auction of Gifford's paintings.
  - related: Sunrise, Long Branch, New Jersey, (1864), private collection.
  - related: Long Branch Beach (1867), Palmer Museum of Art, State College, Pennsylvania
  - related: Beach Scene (c.1870), Edison National Historic Site, West Orange, New Jersey
- **Sunset over the Mouth of the Shrewsbury River** (1868), private collection. Exhibited at the 1876 Centennial Exposition, Philadelphia.
  - Shrewsbury River, Sandy Hook (1868), unlocated.
- Valley of the Chugwater, Wyoming Territory (1870), Amon Carter Museum, Fort Worth, Texas
  - related Red Buttes, Wyoming Territory (1870), unlocated
- Mount Hood and the Dalles, Columbia River, Oregon (1870), private collection. Exhibited at the National Academy of Design in 1870. (See Note A, below)
- Kauterskill Falls (1871), Detroit Institute of Arts
- Outlet of Catskill Lake (1872), Loeb Art Center, Vassar College, Poughkeepsie, New York. Sold for $275 at the posthumous April 11 & 12, 1881 auction of Gifford's paintings.
- **Mount Rainier, Bay of Tacoma** (1875), Seattle Art Museum. Exhibited at the 1878 Paris Salon.
  - related: Mount Rainier, Washington Territory (1874), private collection
- Autumn - A Catskills Wood Path (1876), Cleveland Museum of Art. Purchased by J. G. Brown for $255 at the posthumous April 11 & 12, 1881 auction of Gifford's paintings.
- An Indian Summer Day on the Claverack Creek (1877), Metropolitan Museum of Art
- A Sunset, Bay of New York (1878), Everson Museum of Art, Syracuse, New York
  - related: Sunset over New York Bay (c.1878), private collection
- Sunset over the Palisades on the Hudson (1879), private collection
  - related: Sunset on the Hudson (1876), Wadsworth Atheneum, Hartford, Connecticut
  - related: The Palisades (1877), Williams College Museum of Art, Williamstown, Massachusetts

=== American Civil War ===
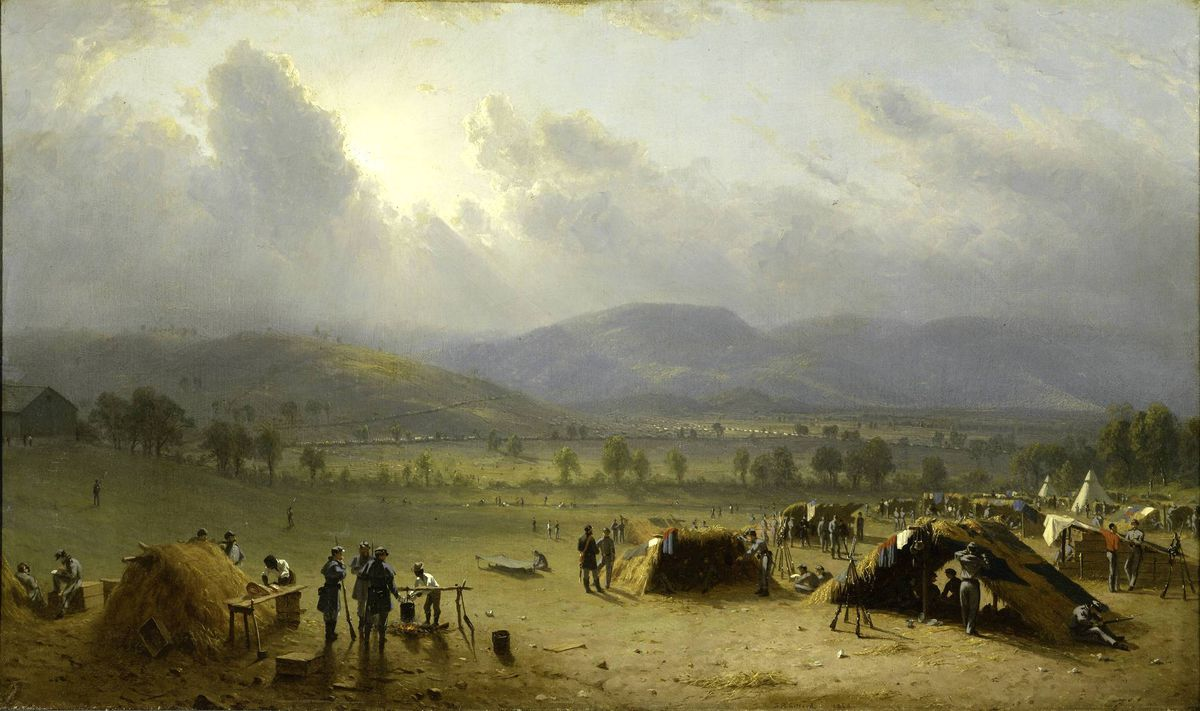
Camp of the Seventh Regiment, near Frederick, Maryland, in July 1863 (1864), Seventh Regiment Armory, New York City

- Preaching to the Troops - Sunday Morning at Camp Cameron (1861), Union League Club of New York. Painted from Meridian Hill, Georgetown, Washington, D.C., about two miles northwest of the U.S. Capitol.
- Bivouac of the Seventh Regiment at Arlington Heights, Virginia (1861). Purchased by William Schaus for $630 at the posthumous April 11 & 12, 1881 auction of Gifford's paintings. Reportedly, damaged in the April 21, 1881 Madison-Square Garden disaster.
  - related: Bivouac of the Seventh Infantry (1861)
- **Baltimore in 1862: A Sunset from Federal Hill** (1862), Seventh Regiment Armory, New York City. Sold for $325 at the posthumous April 11 & 12, 1881 auction of Gifford's paintings. Reportedly, damaged in the April 21, 1881 Madison Square Garden disaster.
  - related: The Basin of the Patapsco from Federal Hill, Baltimore (c.1862), private collection
- **Camp of the Seventh Regiment, near Frederick, Maryland, in July 1863** (1864), Seventh Regiment Armory, New York City

== See also ==
- List of Hudson River School artists
