= Tivoli (Sanford Robinson Gifford) =

Painting by Sanford Robinson Gifford

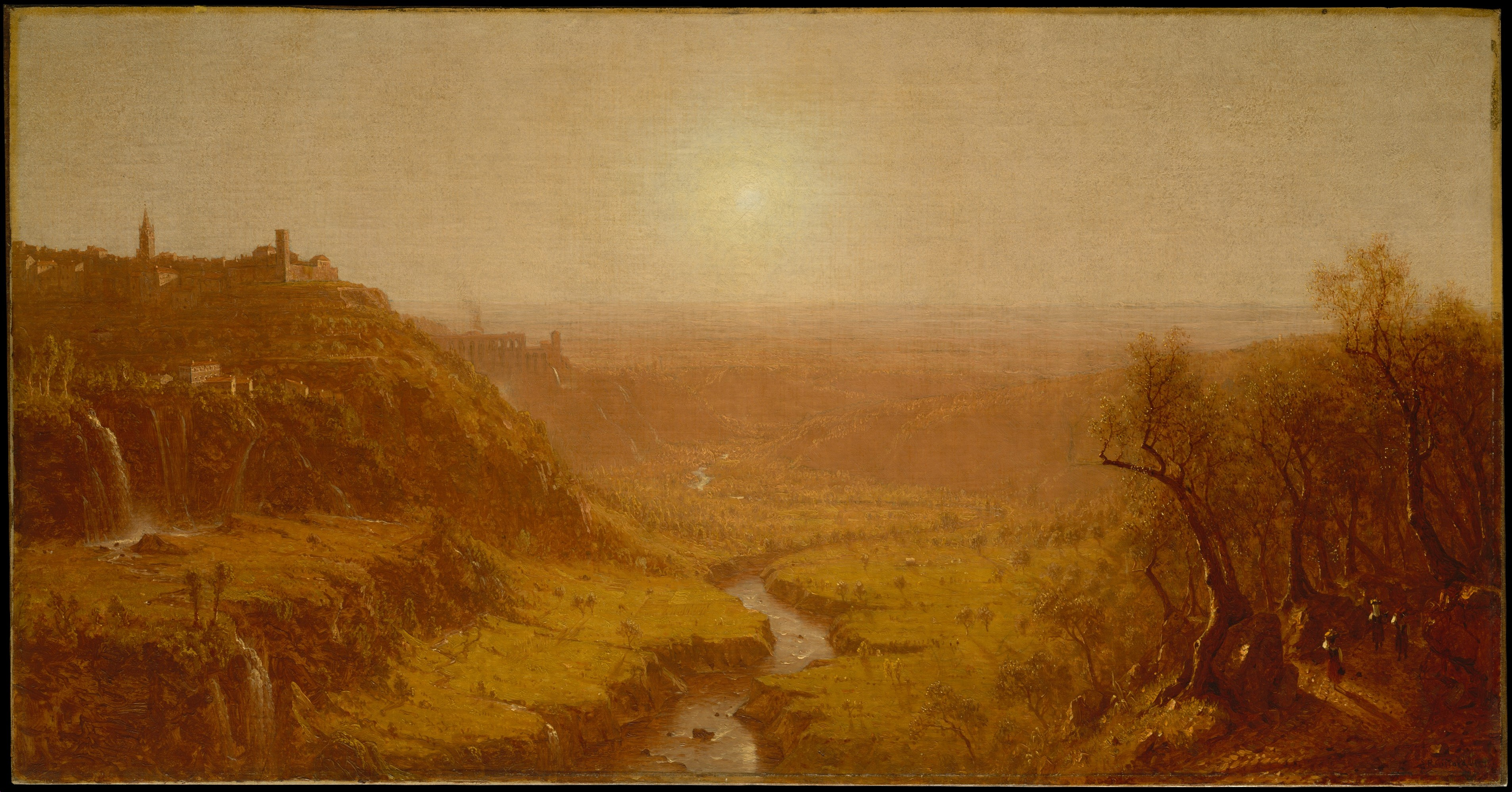
- Artist: Sanford Robinson Gifford
- Year: 1870
- Medium: Oil on canvas
- Dimensions: 67 cm × 128 cm (26 in × 50 in)
- Location: Metropolitan Museum of Art; New York City

Tivoli is a 19th-century painting by the American artist Sanford Robinson Gifford. Done in oil on canvas, the work depicts a sunlit day in the town of Tivoli in Italy. The view of the town, the Aniene River, and surrounding valley was described by Gifford as “one of the finest views in the world”. The painting, which is in the collection of the Metropolitan Museum of Art, was produced for noted New York art collector Robert Gordon.
