= Beach (disambiguation) =

A beach is a geological formation consisting of loose rock particles along the shoreline of a body of water.

Beach, Beaches or beaching may also refer to:

== Geography ==
=== Canada ===
- Beaches (federal electoral district), a federal electoral district in Toronto, Ontario
- Beaches (provincial electoral district), a provincial riding in Toronto, Ontario
- Beaches, Newfoundland and Labrador, a village
- The Beaches, Toronto, a neighbourhood of Toronto, Canada

=== United States ===
- Beach, Georgia, an unincorporated community
- Beach, Missouri, an unincorporated community
- Beach, North Dakota, a city
- Beach, Washington, an unincorporated community
- Jacksonville Beaches, or Beaches, a neighborhood of Jacksonville, Florida
- The Beach (waterpark), a former water park in Albuquerque, New Mexico
- The Beach at Adventure Landing, a water park in Mason, Ohio

=== Other places ===
- Beach, Gloucestershire, a village in England
- Kingdom of Beach, a promontory of Terra Australis appearing on Latin maps of the 16th century
- List of beaches, of the world, sorted by country

== Arts, entertainment, and media ==
=== Books ===
- Beaches (novel), a 1986 novel by Iris Rainer Dart
- The Beach (novel), a 1996 novel by Alex Garland
- Sebastian Beach, character in the stories of P. G. Wodehouse

=== Film, TV, and Radio ===
- Beaches (1988 film), starring Bette Midler and Barbara Hershey
- Beaches (2017 film), a television remake of the 1988 film, starring Idina Menzel and Nia Long
- The Beach (film), a 2000 film starring Leonardo DiCaprio
- The Beach (TV series), a 2020 Australian lifestyle television series shown on SBS and NITV
- The Beach (UK radio station), a British commercial local radio station in Great Yarmouth, Norfolk
- CHWC-FM, a radio station in Goderich, Ontario, Canada, that identifies as "The Beach"
- KTBH-FM, a radio station called "The Beach" on the Big Island of Hawaii
- "The Beach" (Avatar: The Last Airbender) season 3, episode 5 (2007)

=== Music ===
- Beach music, a music genre of the 1950s and 1960s
- The Beaches (band), Canadian rock band
- Beaches (soundtrack), the soundtrack to the 1988 film
- "Beach" (song), a song by San Cisco from San Cisco (2012)
- "The Beach" (song), a song by Miss Kittin & The Hacker from First Album (2003)
- "The Beach", a song by All Time Low from So Wrong, It's Right (2007)
- "Beaches", a song by Beabadoobee from This Is How Tomorrow Moves (2024)
- The Beach, a 2010 album by Ron Contour (an alias of Moka Only)

== Little Beach ==
- Little Beach in Makena State Park, Hawaii, United States
- Little Beach, New Jersey, United States
- Little Beach, Portland, Dorset, England

== Other uses ==
- California State University, Long Beach, often colloquially referred to as "The Beach"
  - The Long Beach State athletic program, officially branded as "The Beach" since 2020–21
- Beaching (nautical), to lay a vessel ashore or ground it deliberately
- Bettering the Evaluation and Care of Health (BEACH), an Australian Department of Health system for collecting data from general practice
- Beaches Resorts, a Caribbean all-inclusive resort chain
- Cetacean stranding, when a whale beaches itself
- Toronto Beaches (lacrosse), a Canadian lacrosse team

== See also ==
- Beech (disambiguation)
- On the Beach (disambiguation)
