= King's Pier =

Quay in Dorset, England

Coordinates: 50.5591°N 2.4214°W

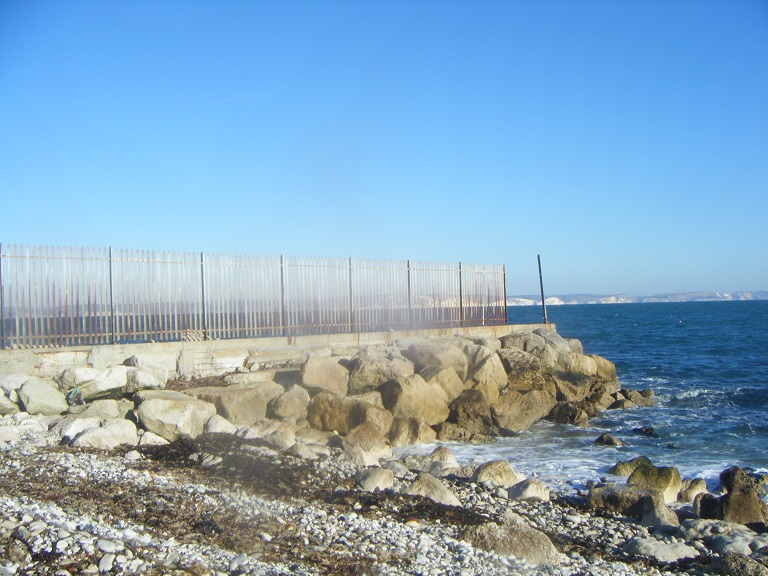
King's Pier as it remains today.

King's Pier is a 17th-century stone shipping quay, located on the Isle of Portland, Dorset, England; part of the Jurassic Coast. It is found at the boundary point of the land owned by Portland Port Ltd, on the east side of the island within the area of East Weares. To the north of the pier is Balaclava Bay, whilst further south along the coastline are the remains of Folly Pier and Folly Pier Waterworks, East Weare Rifle Range, the two Salt Pans, Little Beach and Durdle Pier respectively. When active, King's Pier was one of the most important stone shipping pier sites.

== History ==
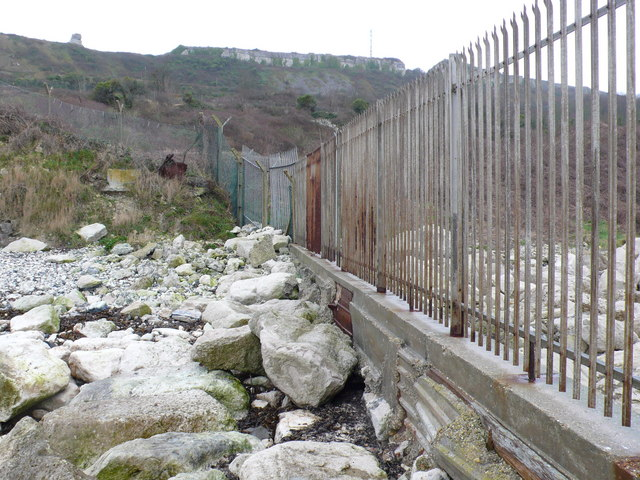
A view from King's Pier looking up towards the cliffs, on top of which is the Verne Citadel, (once HM Prison The Verne).

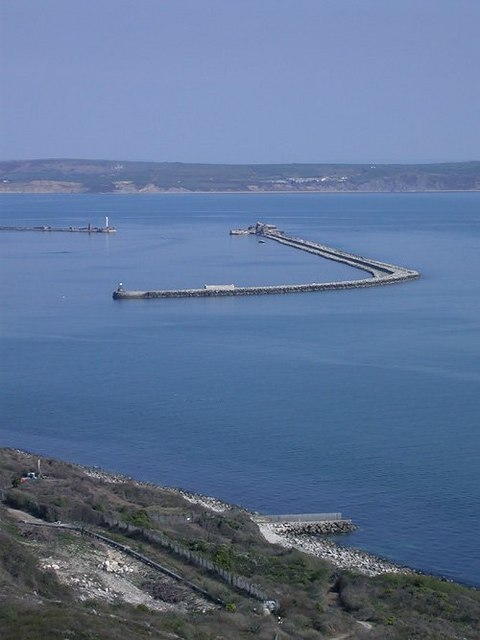
King's Pier in the foreground, with the outer arm of the breakwater in the distance.

The pier was first recorded on a 1710 map, although historical documents date King's Pier to 1622 for the shipment of stone to Whitehall in London. Work originally started in 1619, and cost £700. British architect Inigo Jones chose Portland Stone for the rebuilding of the Banqueting House at Whitehall, London, in 1619, and from then on the island's stone became increasingly popular. King's Pier became one of the main stone shipping places on the east side.

The limestone quarries of East and Penn's Weares were the location of Sir Christopher Wren's first workings of stone to rebuild London after the Great Fire of 1666. The stone was shipped from the adjacent Durdle, Folly, and King's Piers. The stone for St. Paul's Cathedral came from the East and Penn's Weares quarries, and the majority of it was shipped from King's Pier.

Once quarrying in the area was reduced, and quarries moved inland from the cliffs, the pier fell out of use, and any cranes were removed. The remnants of the pier ended up being used as the boundary of the naval base. Portland Harbour was sold by the navy in 1996 as a commercial port run by Portland Port Ltd, and the boundary fencing on King's Pier continues to stand today.
