= The Beach Waterpark =

The Beach Waterpark may refer to:

- The Beach at Adventure Landing, a waterpark in Mason, Ohio.
- The Beach (waterpark), a closed waterpark in Albuquerque, New Mexico.

== See also ==
- Beach
- Beach (disambiguation)
