= Salt Pans, Portland =

Geologic features in Dorset, England

Coordinates: 50.5508°N 2.4165°W

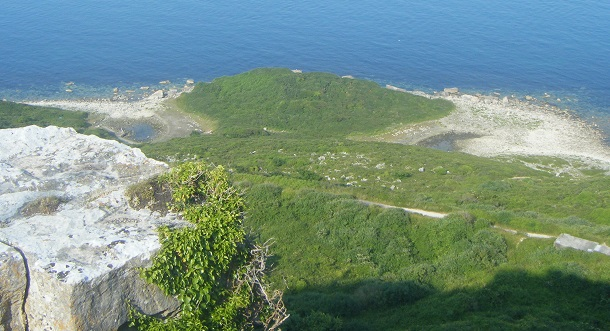
The Salt Pans seen from the cliff top of East Weares.

The Salt Pans are two salt pans on the Isle of Portland, Dorset, England. Both pans sit next to one another, and are situated on the coastline of East Weares, the east side of Portland. The pans sit directly below the Young Offenders Institution HM Prison Portland, and are found close to various old historic relics such as the East Weare Rifle Range, Folly Pier, King's Pier and the remains of the Folly Pier Waterworks. The East Weares area, including the Salt Pans, has been labelled a Site of Special Scientific Interest (SSSI), largely due to the scrub and wildlife being of high nature conservation value.

== History ==
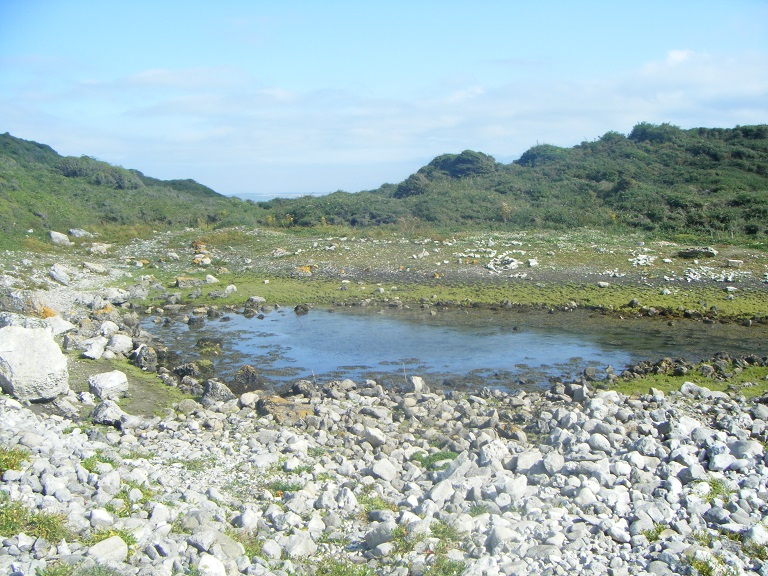
The southernmost salt pan seen close up.

Situated along the eastern coastline of East Weares, the two salt pans have existed for many centuries. The origins of the pans remain uncertain, however the limited evidence recorded suggest they are likely to be medieval. During Saxon and Norman times the pans were one of two places for the thriving salt production industry on Portland. The other was the tidal lagoon known as The Mere, which was situated at the north of the island. The two pans at East Weares were formed by the digging of Kimmeridge clay.

The pans would flood at high Spring Tides and once they dried out through the evaporation of the seawater, the encrusted salt would be removed from the rocks. Although the pans have remained unused for centuries, both remain completely intact and undisturbed.

== Access ==
The salt pans can be reached via an unofficial pathway veering off the official coastal path of the East Weares area. A similar pathway further north links to the remains of the Folly Pier Waterworks. Sitting on the coastline, the pans link directly to the sea and thus can be reached via the coastline edge as well. The pans can also be viewed from the clifftops of Grove Point.
