= The Beeches =

The Beeches may refer to:

- Beeches (Frankfort, Kentucky), a brick house in Frankfort, Kentucky, listed on the National Register of Historic Places
- The Beeches (Saugatuck, Michigan), historic house and inn in Saugatuck, Michigan, listed on the National Register of Historic Places
- The Beeches (Springfield, Tennessee), a historic mansion in Springfield, Tennessee, listed on the National Register of Historic Places
- The Beeches (St. Albans, West Virginia), a historic home located at St. Albans, West Virginia, listed on the National Register of Historic Places
- The Beeches (painting), an 1845 painting by Asher Brown Durand

== See also ==
- Beech (disambiguation)
- Beach (disambiguation)
