= Beech (disambiguation) =

Beech is the common name for trees in the genus Fagus.

Beech may also refer to:

== Plants ==
- Fagus sylvatica, the European or common beech
- Nothofagus, the genus of southern beeches
- Gmelina, the genus of Australian and tropical beech and beechwoods

== Places ==
- Beech, Hampshire, England, a village and civil parish
- Beech, Iowa, USA, an unincorporated community
- Beech, West Virginia, USA, an unincorporated community
- Bough Beech, a hamlet in Kent, England
- Burnham Beeches, a nature reserve in Buckinghamshire, England
- Carshalton Beeches, a suburb in Greater London, England
- Beech Senior High School, a public school in Hendersonville, Tennessee

== Other uses ==
- Beech (surname), a surname
- Beech Aircraft Corporation, an aircraft manufacturer

== See also ==
- Beach (disambiguation)
- The Beeches (disambiguation)
- Beeches (Frankfort, Kentucky), historic house
