= Beach games =

Beach games are games played on the beach. Beach games may refer to:

- ANOC World Beach Games
- African Beach Games
- Asian Beach Games
- Mediterranean Beach Games
- South American Beach Games
- South Asian Beach Games

== See also ==
- Games (disambiguation)
- Beach (disambiguation)
- Category:Beach sports
- Beach volleyball at the Olympics
