= Lefty Turner =

American baseball player

- First baseman
- Born: July 8, 1912; Beach, Georgia, US
- Died: August 13, 2000 (aged 88); Palatka, Florida, US
- Batted: Right Threw: Left

Negro league baseball debut
- 1940, for the Indianapolis Crawfords

Last appearance
- 1943, for the Harrisburg–St. Louis Stars

Teams
- Indianapolis Crawfords (1940); Baltimore Elite Giants (1942); Harrisburg–St. Louis Stars (1943)

James Henry Turner (July 8, 1912 – August 13, 2000), nicknamed "Lefty", was an American Negro league first baseman in the 1940s.

A native of Beach, Georgia, Turner graduated from Central Academy in Palatka, Florida, where he was an all-state football player. He made his Negro leagues debut in 1940 with the Indianapolis Crawfords, and played for the Baltimore Elite Giants in 1942. He played for the Harrisburg–St. Louis Stars the following season. Turner died in Palatka in 2000 at age 88.
