= Kiddie Pool =

Kiddie Pool may refer to:

- Kiddie pool, or children's pool
- "Kiddie Pool" (Robot Chicken episode), a 2005 episode of the stop-motion TV series
- "Kiddie Pool", a 2006 short story by Tom Perrotta
- "Kiddie Pool", a 2012 song by Lucy Dacus
- Kiddie Pool, the children's section of The Beach (water park) in Albuquerque, New Mexico
