= Progress (The Advance of Civilization) =

1853 painting by Asher Brown Durand

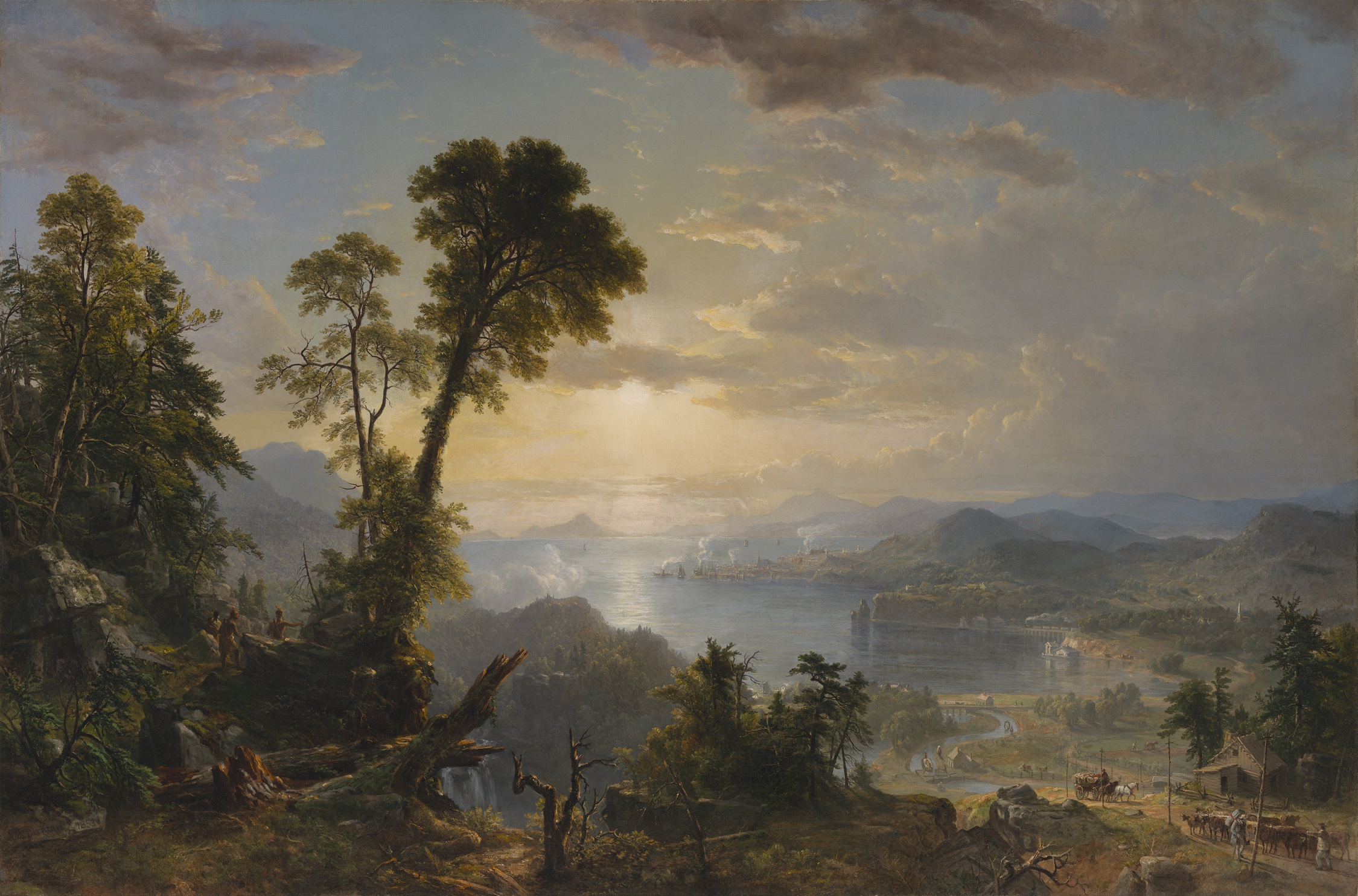
- Artist: Asher Brown Durand
- Year: 1853
- Medium: Oil on canvas
- Dimensions: 121.9 cm × 182.9 cm (48 in × 72 in)
- Location: Virginia Museum of Fine Arts, Richmond, Virginia

Progress (The Advance of Civilization) is a painting by Asher B. Durand, one of the most important works of American art, that was in private hands since its creation in 1853. In 2018, it was gifted to the Virginia Museum of Fine Arts (VMFA) in Richmond, Virginia, by an anonymous donor, becoming the highest valued gift of a single work of art in VMFA's history. The painting is a masterpiece that dramatizes the meeting of nature and civilization, representing the idea of Manifest Destiny and the clash of industrial expansion and nature, as well as Native American culture.

The painting depicts Native Americans standing to the left of trees facing a stream, while a small town, a steam-producing locomotive, and livestock follow the path of telegraph poles on the right. This highlights the sacrifices made by Native Americans in the name of "progress".

The painting was commissioned by Charles Gould, a financier, industrialist, and collector in the 19th century. Despite his involvement in the railroad industry, Gould did not control the painting's subject matter or style. The painting was held in private collections, including that of Jack Warner, and reportedly an unidentified buyer paid $40 million for it in 2011, before being anonymously gifted to the Virginia Museum of Fine Arts in 2018.
