= The Beeches (painting) =

Painting by Asher Brown Durand

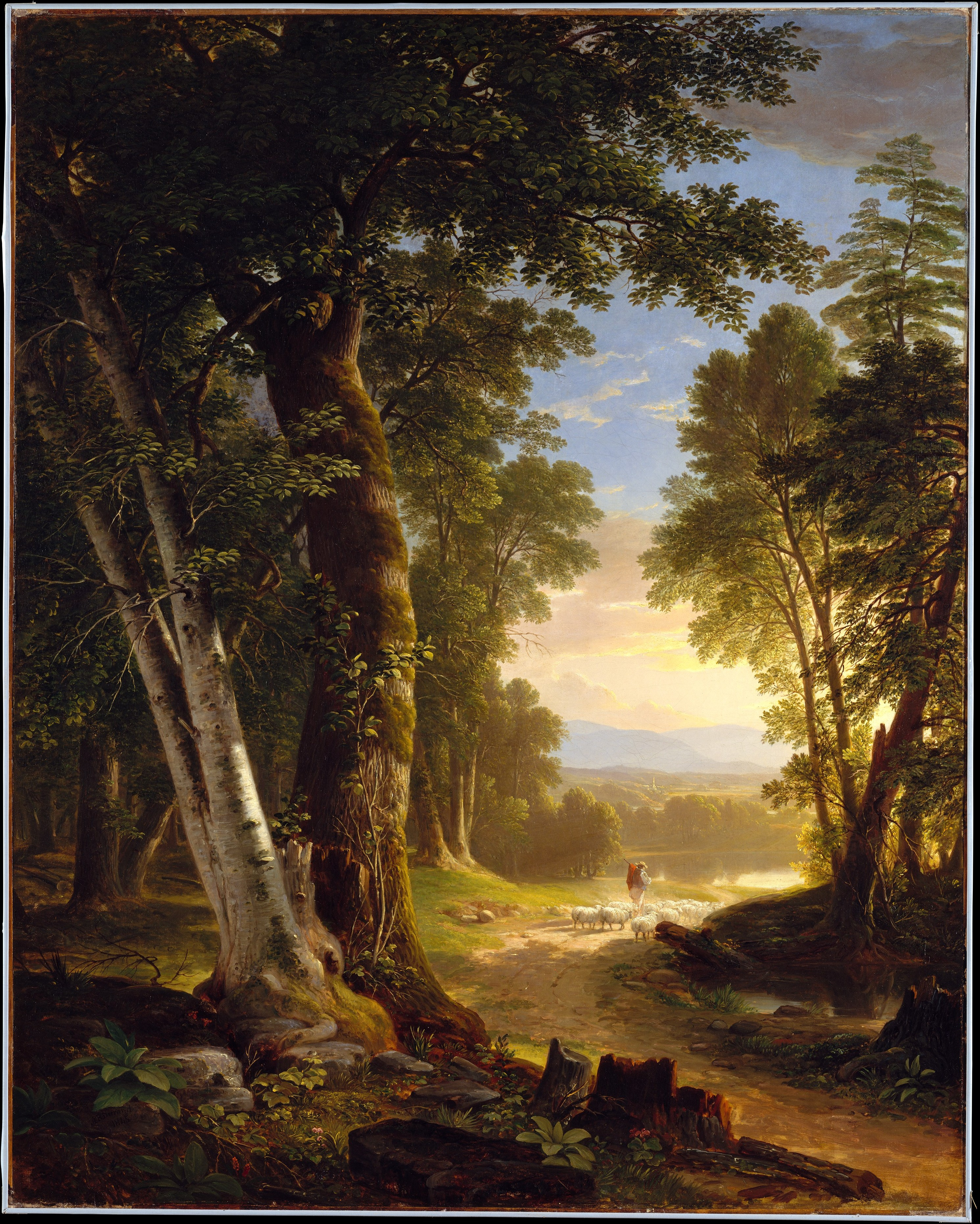
- Artist: Asher Brown Durand
- Year: 1845
- Medium: Oil on canvas
- Dimensions: 153.4 cm × 122.2 cm (60.4 in × 48.1 in)
- Location: Metropolitan Museum of Art; New York City
- Accession: 15.30.59

The Beeches is a mid 19th-century painting by American artist Asher Brown Durand. Done in oil on canvas, the work depicts a forested path in the Northeastern United States. Beeches has been described as one of Durand's earlier works of Naturalist art.

== Description ==
The Beeches was painted by Asher Brown Durand in 1845 on behalf of Abraham Cozzens, a prominent New York art collector. The painting was heavily influenced by the work of British painter John Constable, whose work Durand had viewed during an 1840 trip to the United Kingdom. Durand's work reflects a deviation in the Hudson River School in which landscape paintings began to shift focus from dramatic natural scenes to more tranquil scenes.

The Beeches is in the collection of the Metropolitan Museum of Art.

== See also ==
- The Catskills (painting)
