= Asher Brown Durand =

American painter (1796–1886)

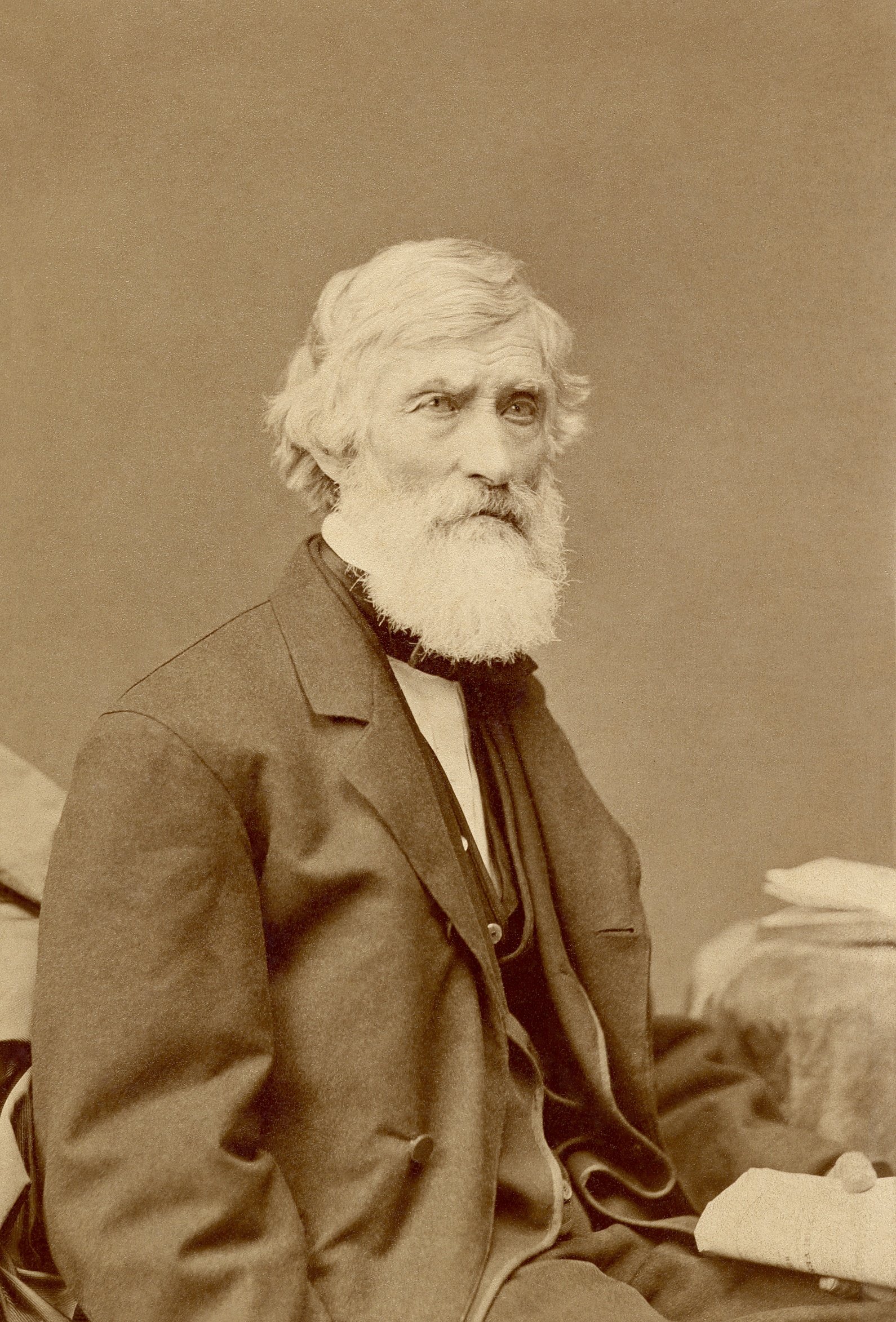
- Asher Brown Durand, c. 1869, by Abraham Bogardus
- Born: August 21, 1796; Maplewood, New Jersey, U.S.
- Died: September 17, 1886 (aged 90); Maplewood, New Jersey, U.S.
- Known for: Painting, Landscape art
- Movement: Hudson River School

Asher Brown Durand (August 21, 1796 – September 17, 1886) was an American engraver and painter of the Hudson River School.

== Early life ==
Durand was born in, and eventually died in, Maplewood, New Jersey (then called Jefferson Village). He was the eighth of eleven children. Durand's father was a watchmaker and a silversmith.

Durand was apprenticed to an engraver from 1812 to 1817 and later entered into a partnership with the owner of the company, Charles Cushing Wright (1796–1854), who asked him to manage the company's New York office. He engraved Declaration of Independence for John Trumbull during 1823, which established Durand's reputation as one of the country's finest engravers. The project took three years and he was paid $3,000. Between 1829 and 1850, he submitted illustrations and engravings for The Token and Atlantic Souvenir annual gift book, including the title page for the 1829 volume. Contemporary critic John Neal praised Durand's engraving of The Wife by Samuel F.B. Morse for The Atlantic Souvenir (1830), which Neal said was better than the original painting.

Durand helped organize the New York Drawing Association in 1825, which would become the National Academy of Design; he would serve the organization as president from 1845 to 1861. There he exhibited 181 engravings and paintings between 1826 and 1860.

Asher's engravings on bank notes were used as the portraits for America's first postage stamps, the 1847 series. Along with his brother Cyrus he also engraved some of the succeeding 1851 issues. Contemporary art historian William Dunlap dubbed Durand America's first engraver.

== Painting career ==
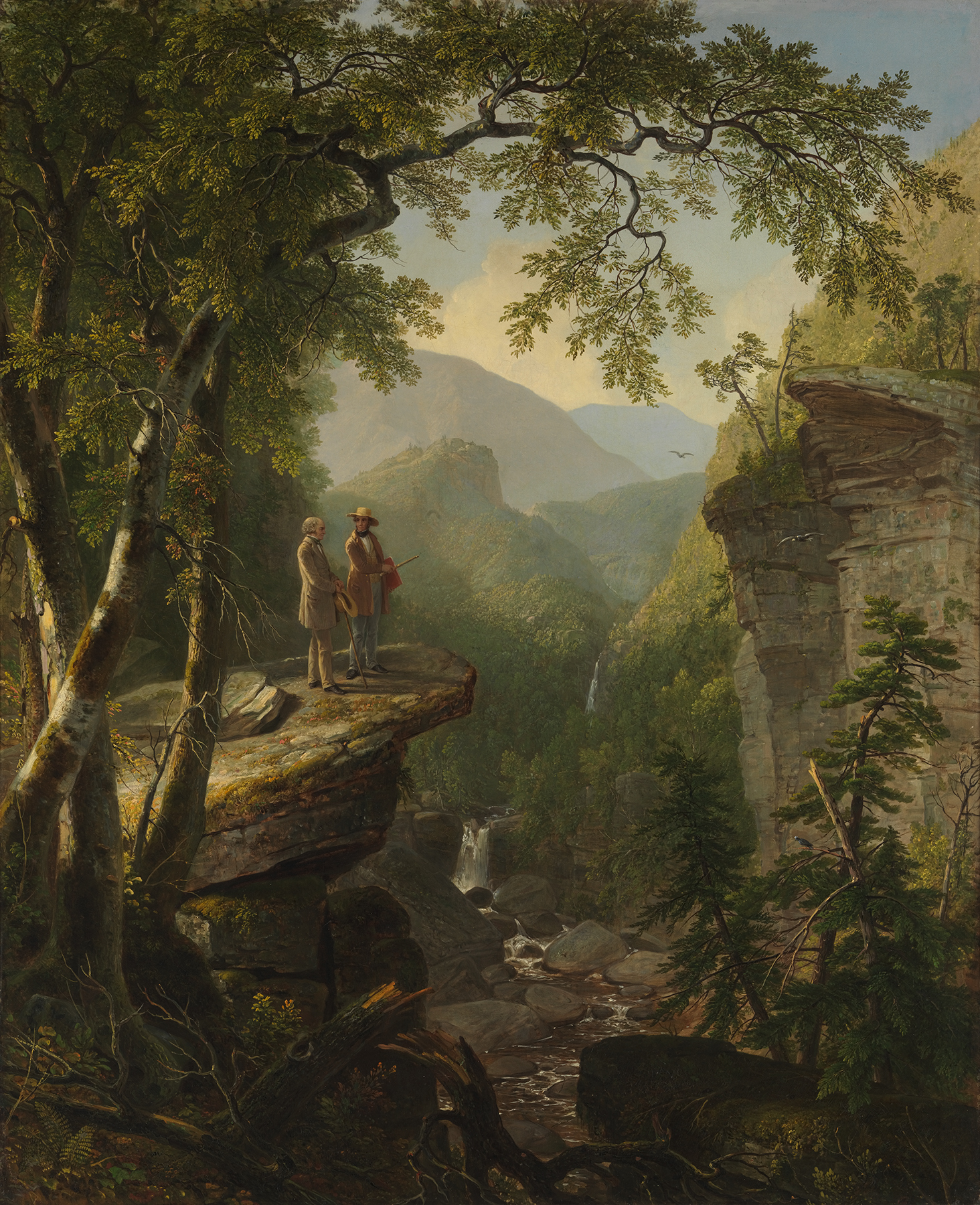
Asher Durand, Kindred Spirits, 1849

Durand's main interest changed from engraving to oil painting around 1830 with the encouragement of his patron, Luman Reed. In 1837, he accompanied his friend Thomas Cole on a sketching expedition to Schroon Lake in the Adirondacks Mountains, and soon after he began to concentrate on landscape painting. He spent summers sketching in the Catskills, Adirondacks, and the White Mountains of New Hampshire, making hundreds of drawings and oil sketches that were later incorporated into finished academy pieces which helped to define the Hudson River School.

Durand is remembered particularly for his detailed portrayals of trees, rocks, and foliage. He was an advocate for drawing directly from nature with as much realism as possible. Durand wrote, "Let [the artist] scrupulously accept whatever [nature] presents him until he shall, in a degree, have become intimate with her infinity...never let him profane her sacredness by a willful departure from truth."

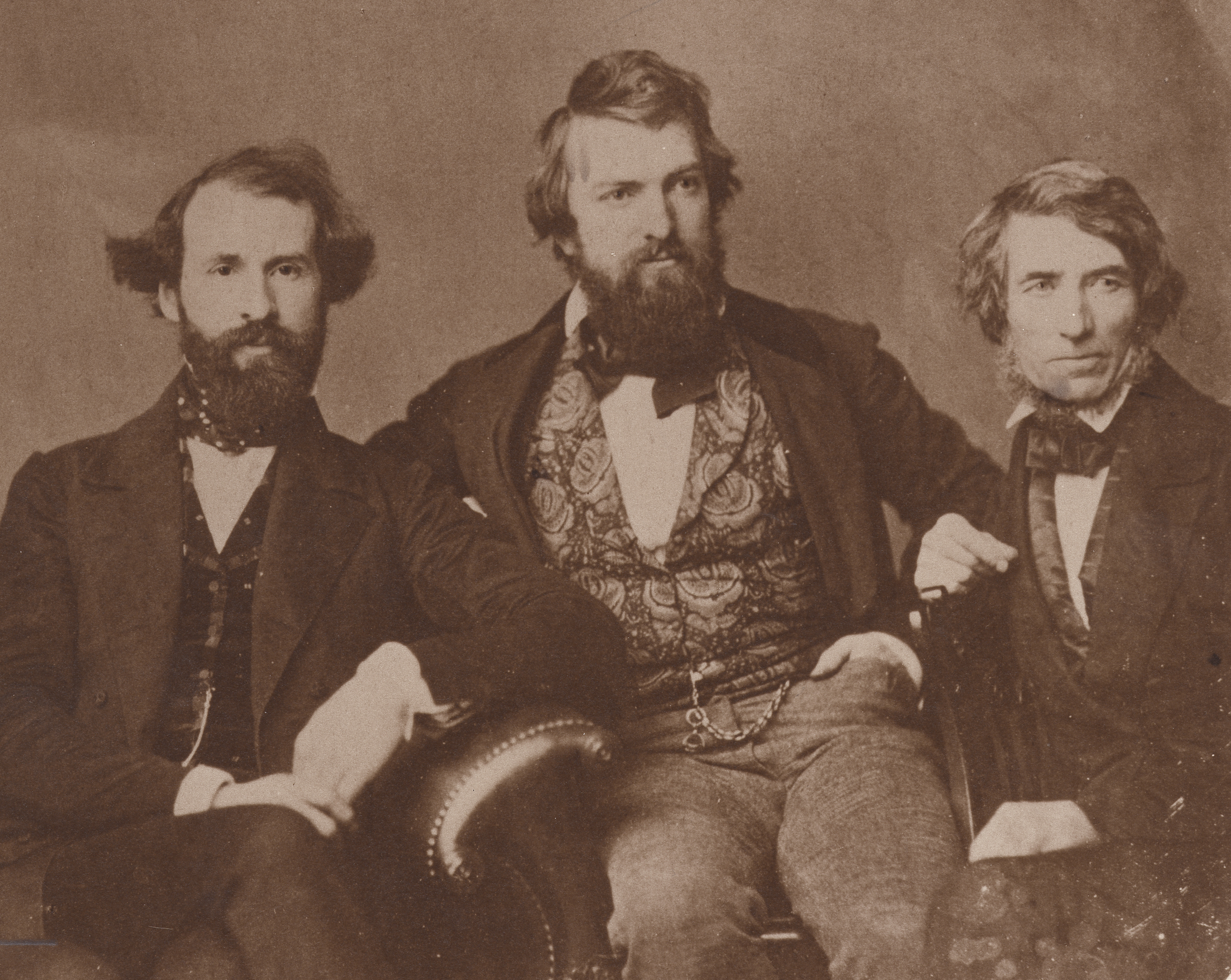
L-R: Henry Kirke Brown, Henry Peters Gray and Durand, 1850

Like other Hudson River School artists, Durand also believed that nature was an ineffable manifestation of God. He expressed this sentiment and his general opinions on art in his essay "Letters on Landscape Painting" in The Crayon, a mid-19th century New York art periodical. Wrote Durand, "[T]he true province of Landscape Art is the representation of the work of God in the visible creation..."

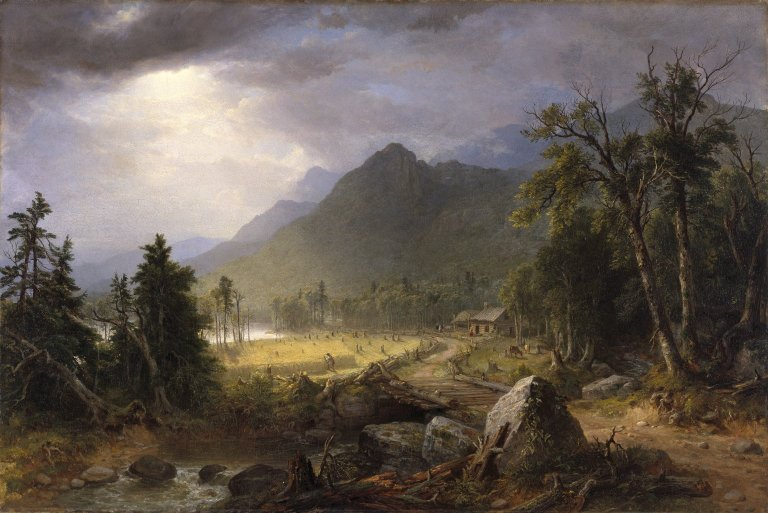
The First Harvest in the Wilderness, c. 1855, Brooklyn Museum

Durand is noted for his 1849 painting Kindred Spirits which shows fellow Hudson River School artist Thomas Cole and poet William Cullen Bryant in a Catskills Mountains landscape. This was painted as a tribute to Cole upon Cole's death in 1848 and a gift to Bryant. The painting, donated by Bryant's daughter Julia to the New York Public Library in 1904, was sold by the library using Sotheby's at an auction in May 2005 to Alice Walton for a purported $35 million (the sale was performed as a sealed, first bid auction, so the actual sales price is not known). At $35 million, however, it would be a record price paid for an American painting at the time.

Another of Durand's paintings is Progress (1853), commissioned by a railroad executive. The landscape depicts America's progress, from a state of nature (on the left, where Native Americans look on), towards the right, where there are roads, telegraph wires, a canal, warehouses, railroads, and steamboats. In December 2018, it was purchased by an anonymous donor for an estimated $40 million and given to the Virginia Museum of Fine Arts.

In 2007, the Brooklyn Museum exhibited nearly sixty of Durand's works in the first monographic exhibition devoted to the painter in more than thirty-five years. The show, entitled "Kindred Spirits: Asher B. Durand and the American Landscape", was exhibited from March 30 to July 29, 2007.

From October 1, 2010 - January 9, 2011, the Fundación Juan March Madrid exhibited "The American Landscapes of Asher B. Durand (1796–1886)," a retrospective of Durand’s work.

Durand is interred in Brooklyn, New York, in Green-Wood Cemetery.

== Gallery ==
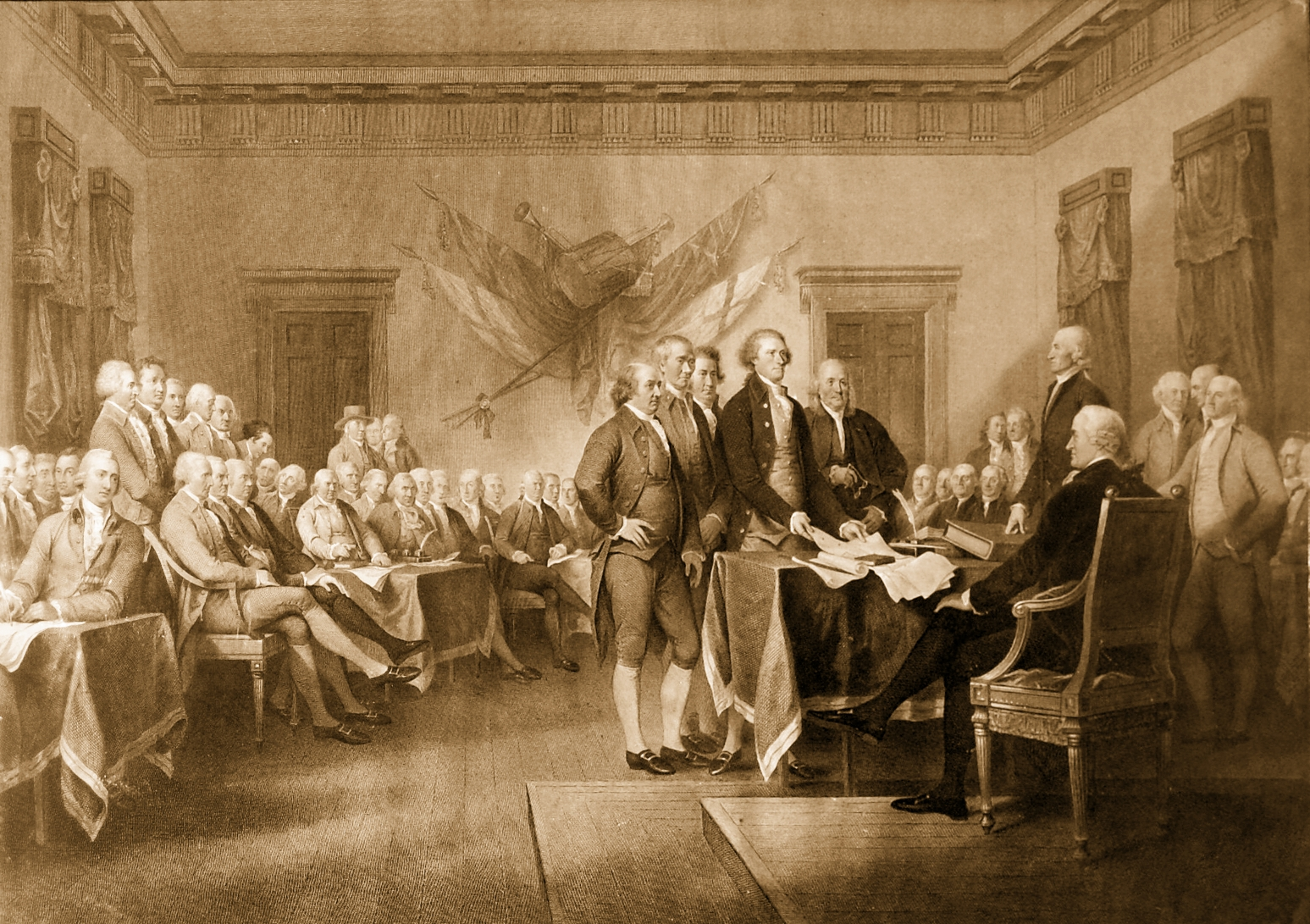
1823
Declaration of Independence (engraving)

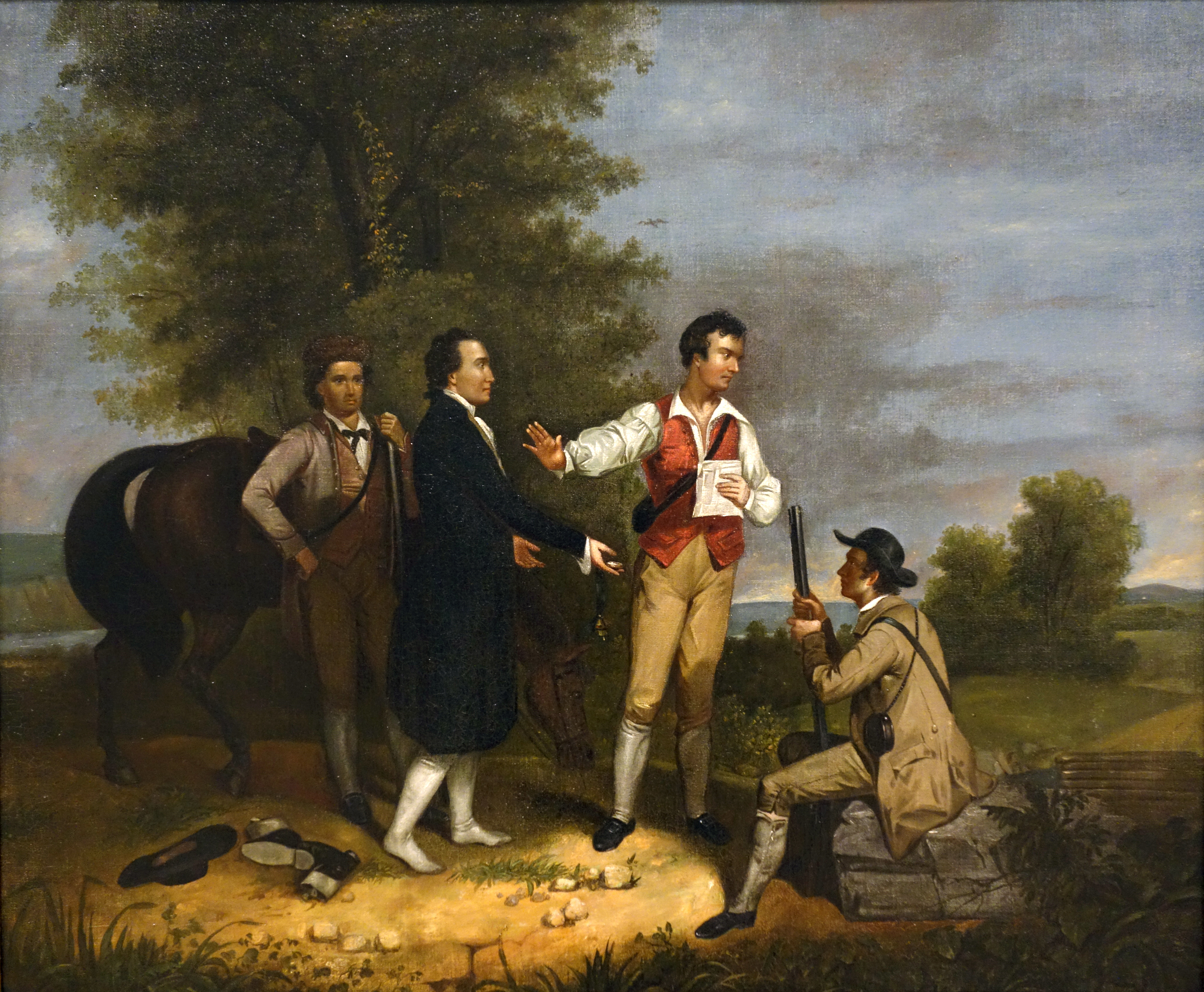
1833
The Capture of Major Andre

1835
Portrait of Luman Reed

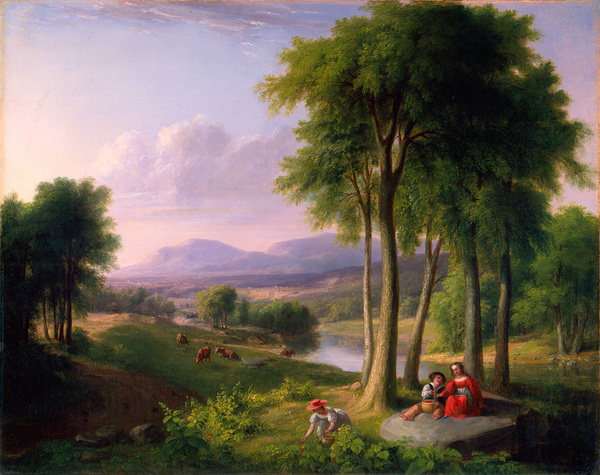
1837
View near Rutland, Vermont

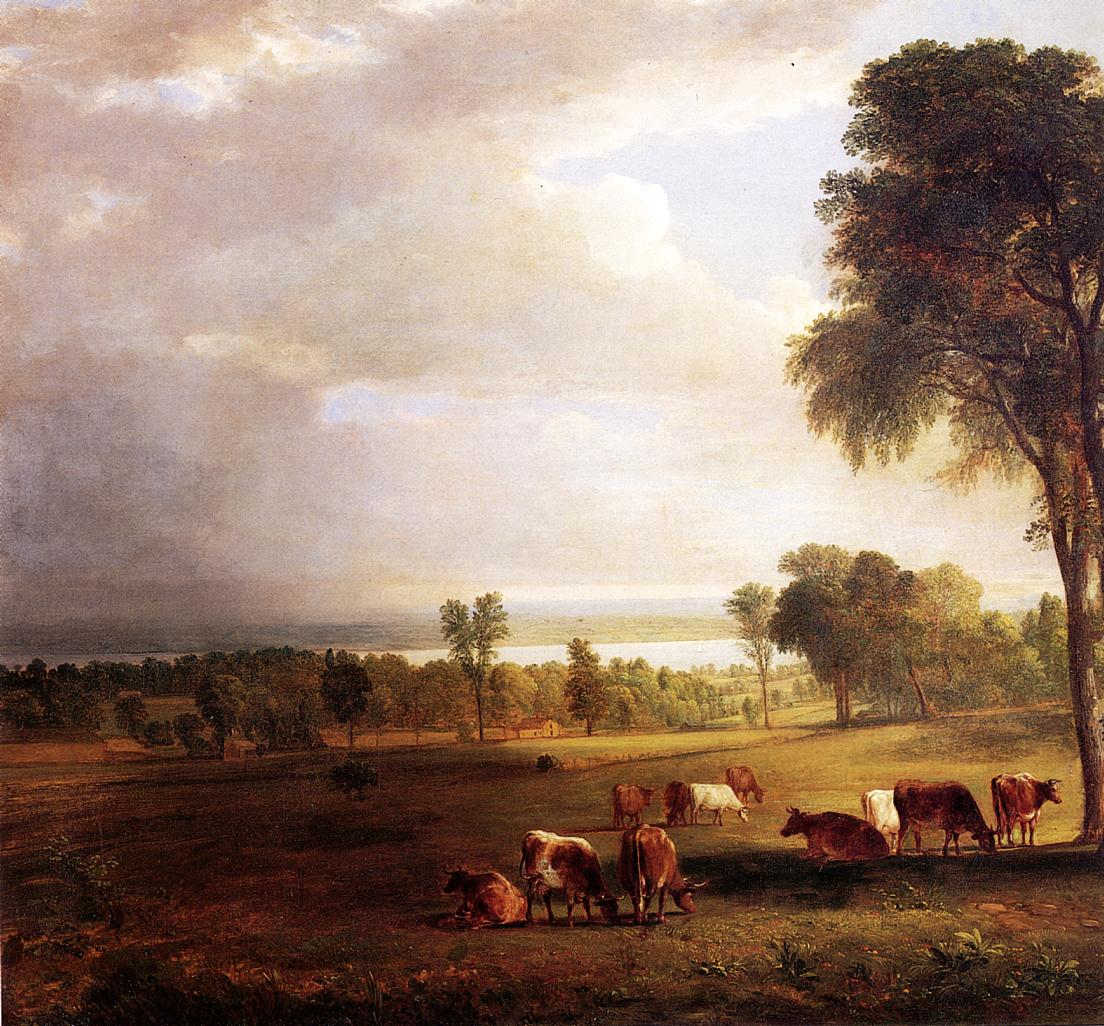
1837
Gathering Storm

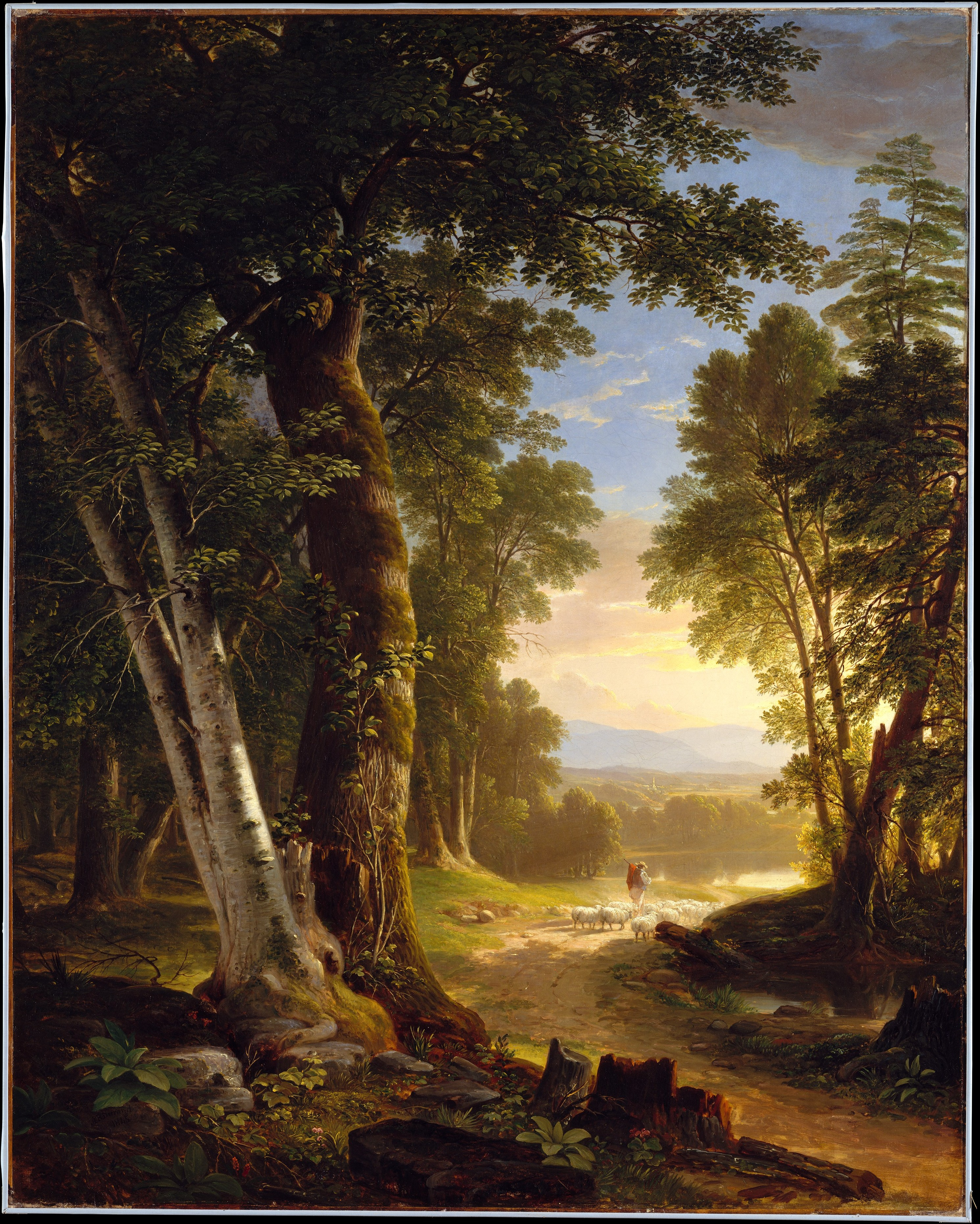
1845
The Beeches

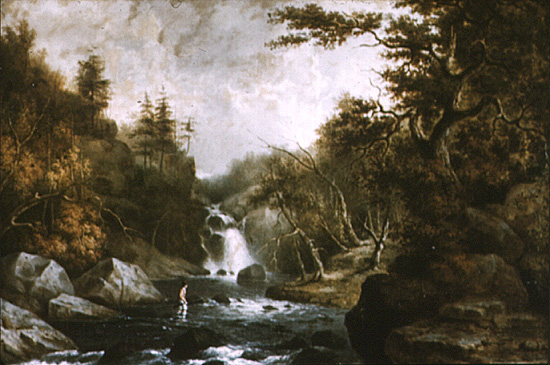
1846 The Hunter

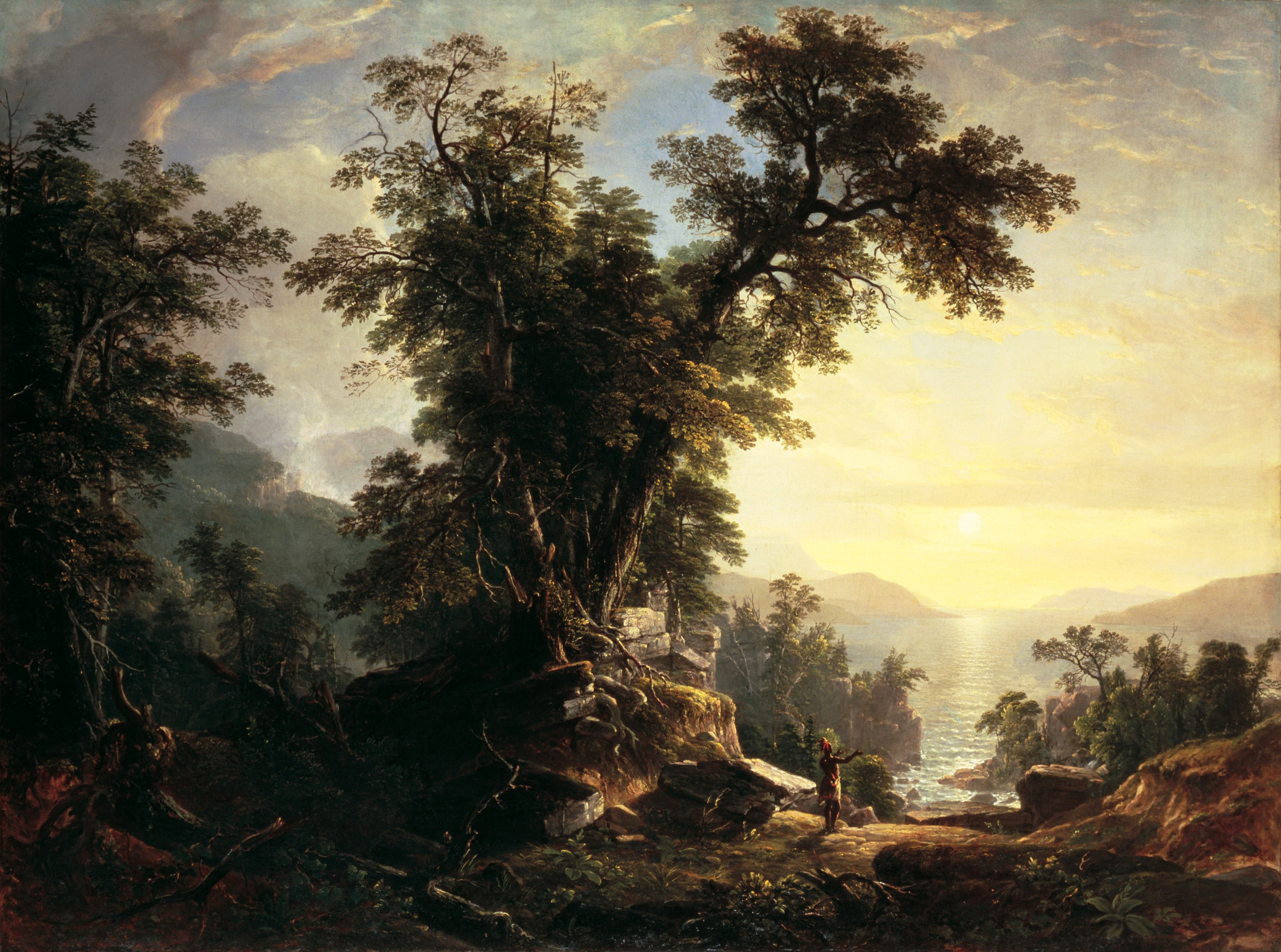
1847
The Indian's Vespers

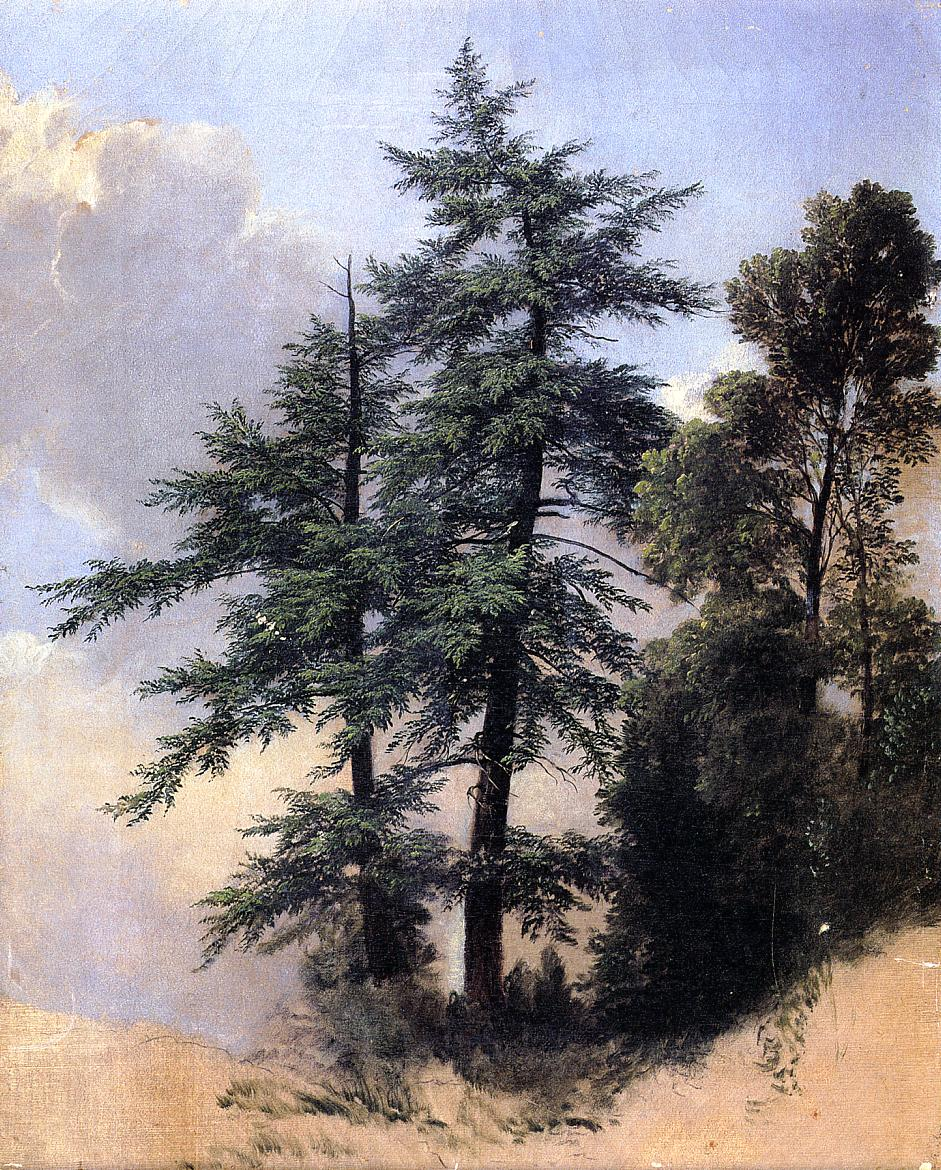
1849
Nature Study, Trees, Newburgh, New York

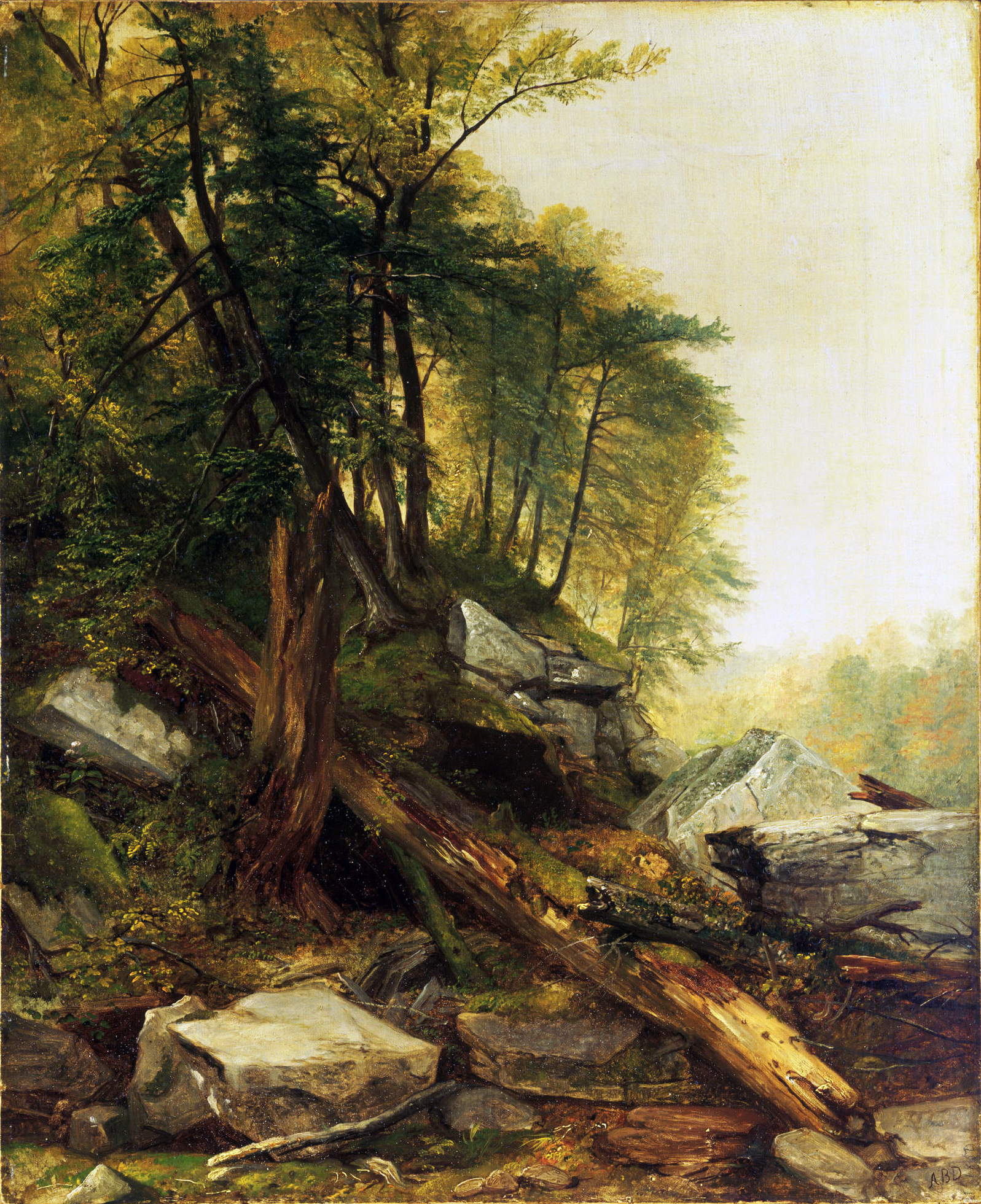
1850
Kaaterskill Landscape, Princeton University Art Museum

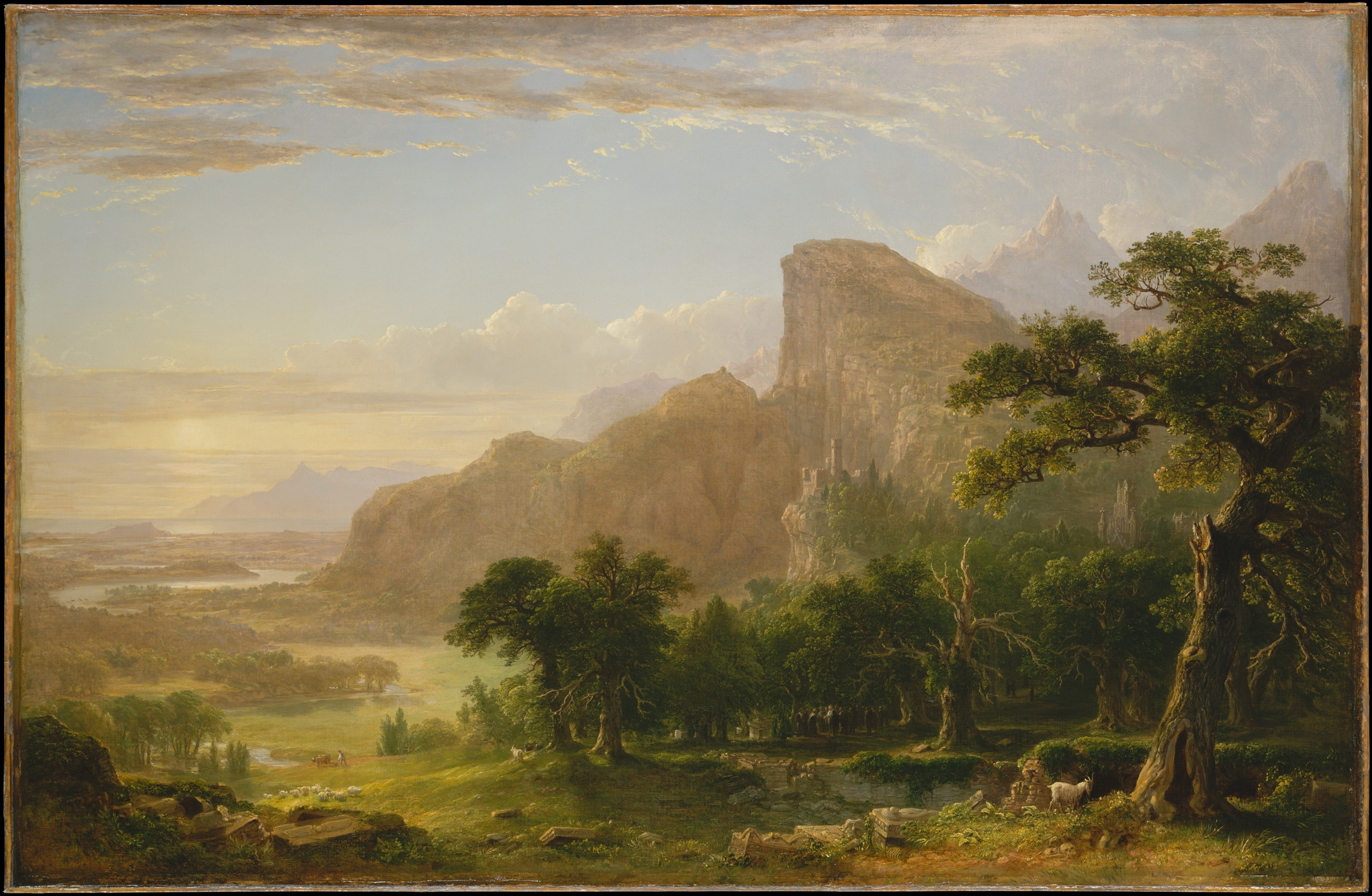
1850
Landscape—Scene from "Thanatopsis", Metropolitan Museum of Art

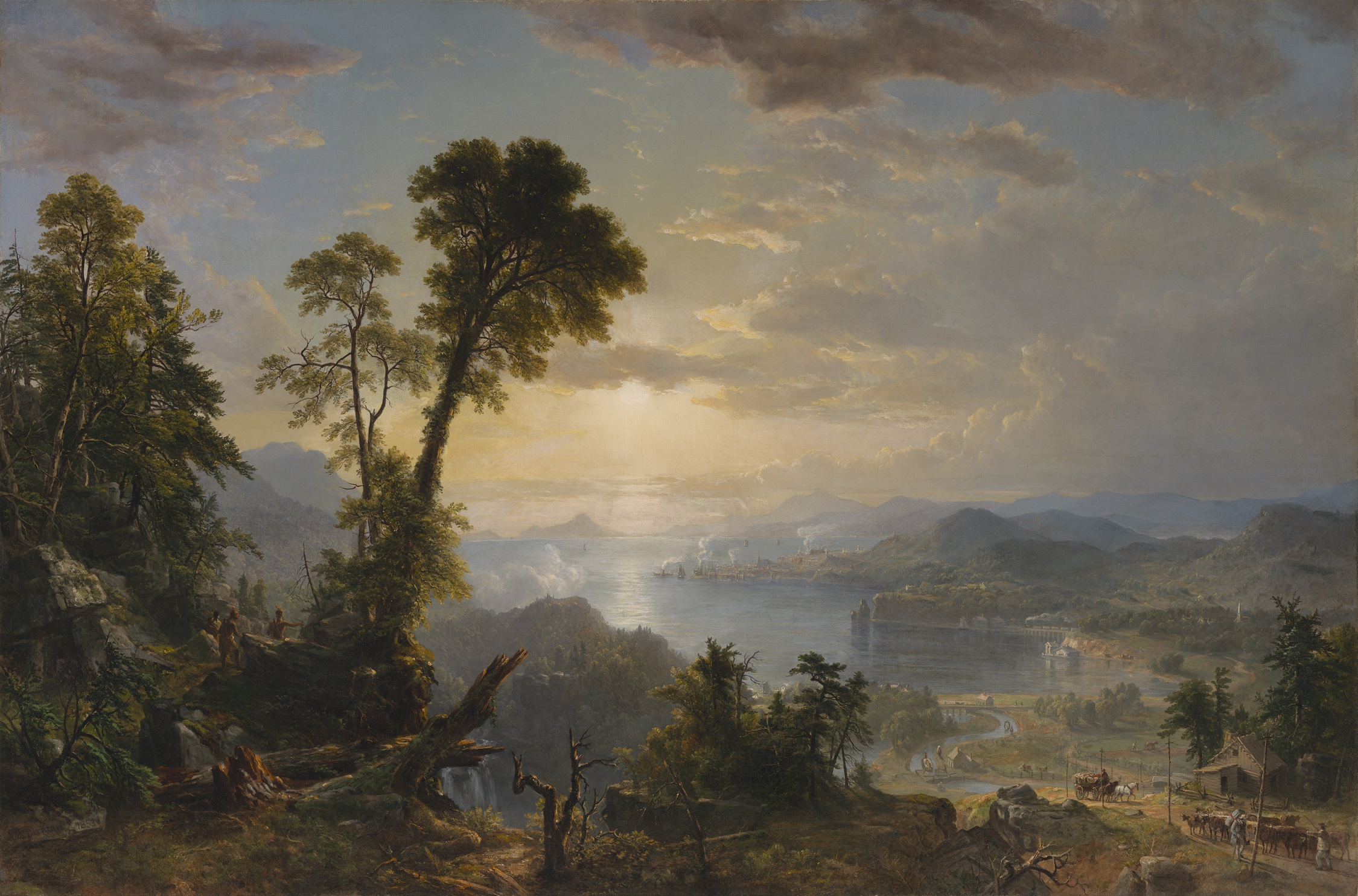
1853
Progress, Virginia Museum of Fine Arts

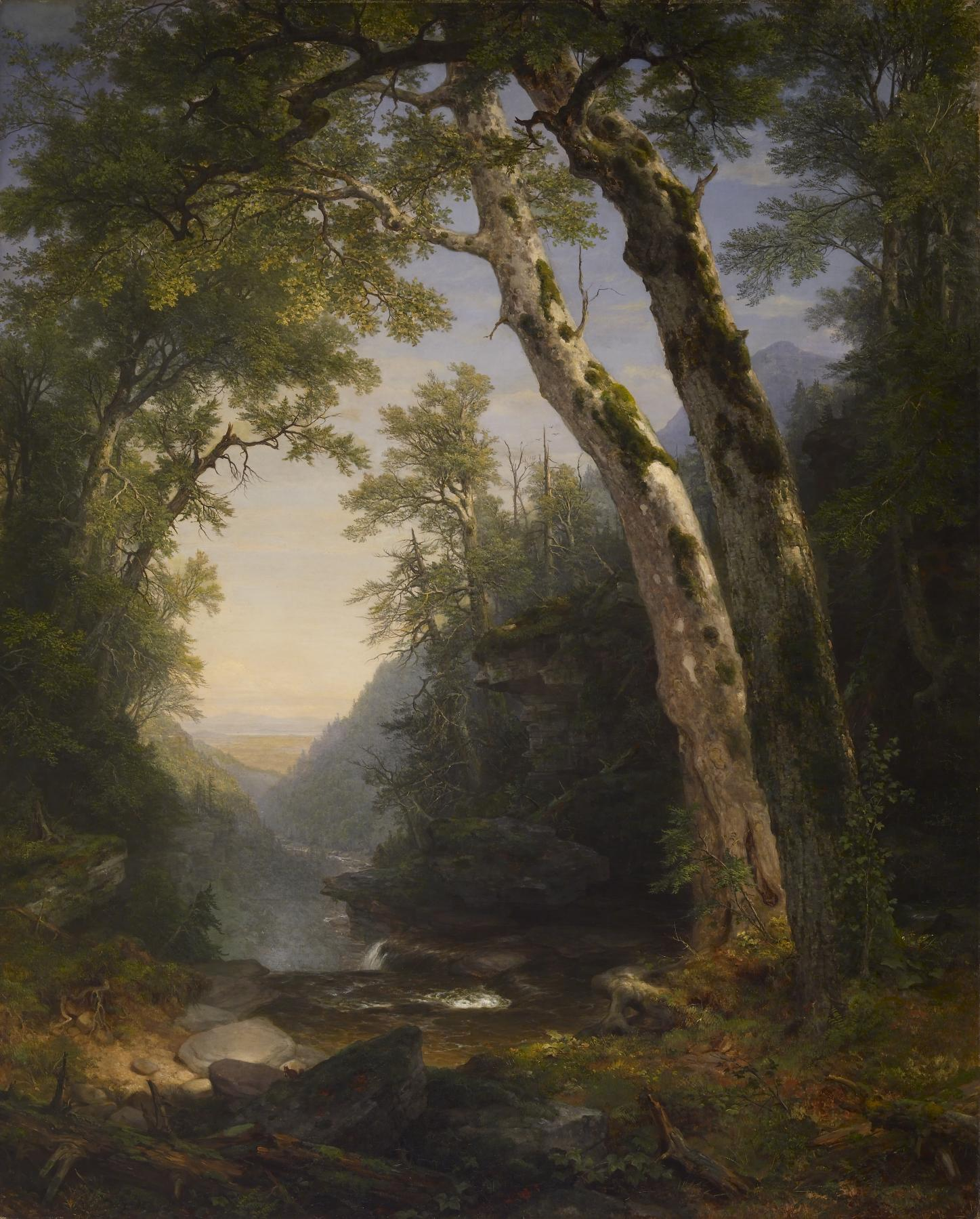
1859
The Catskills, The Walters Art Museum

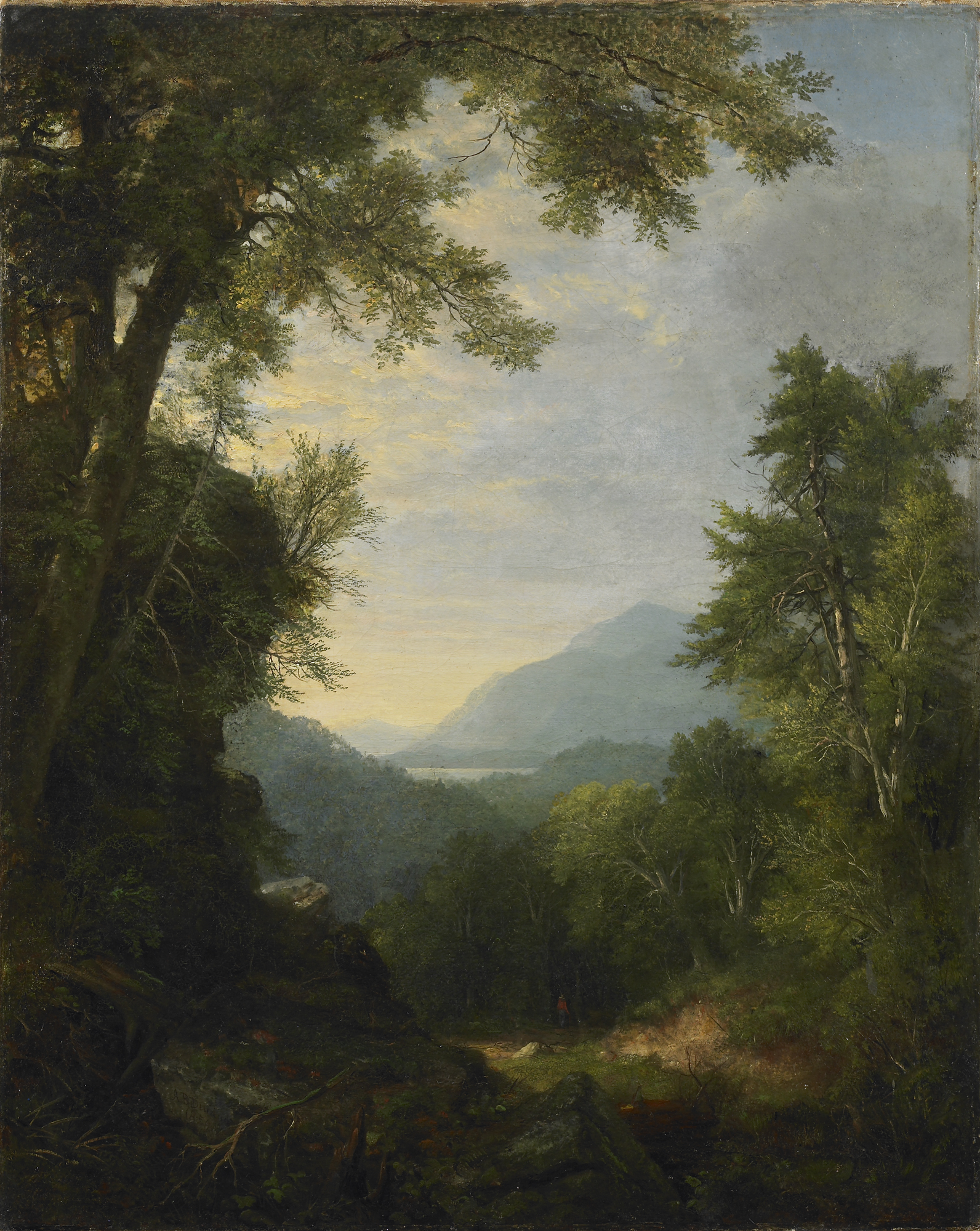
1859
Landscape, Princeton University Art Museum

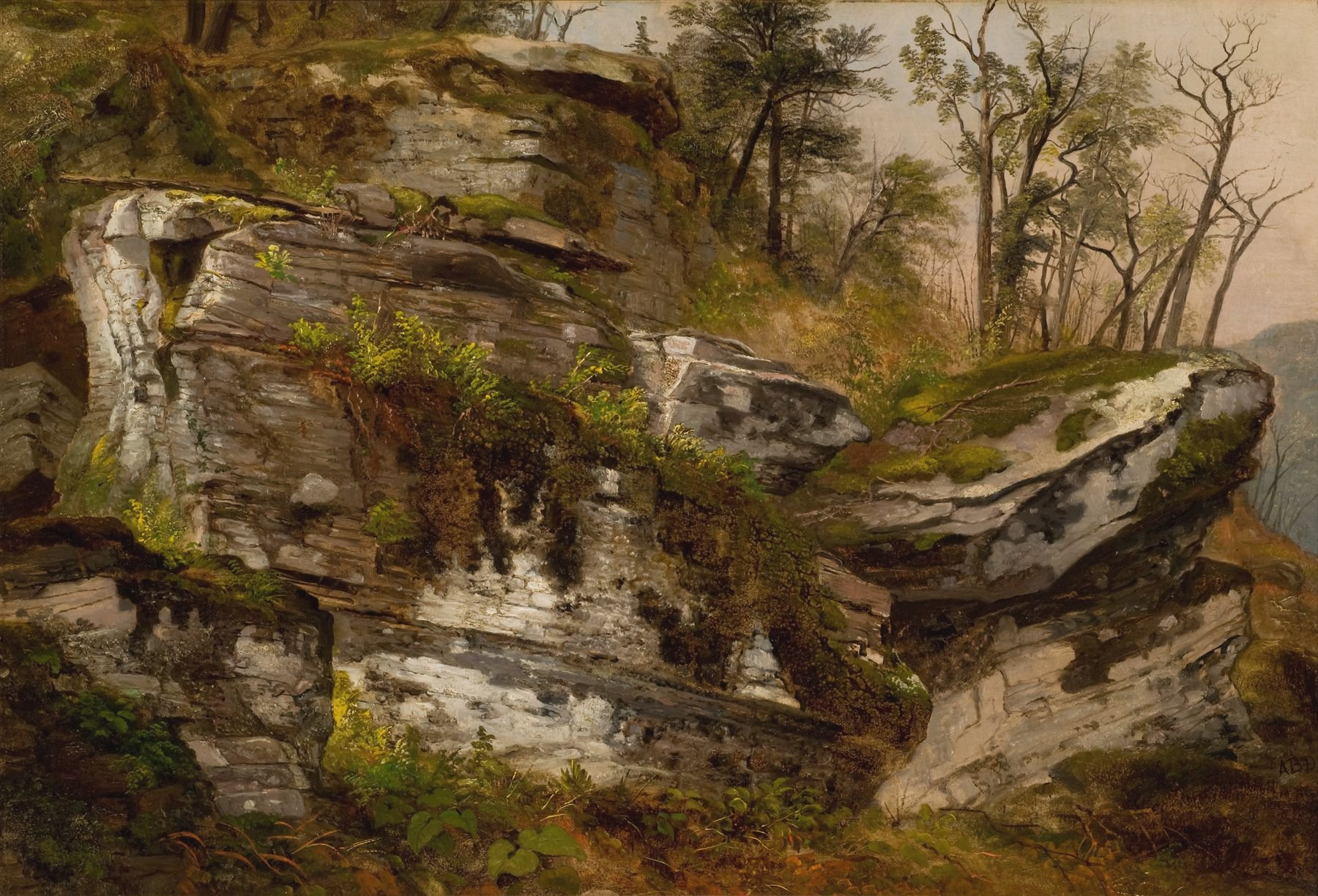
1860
Rocky Cliff, c. 1860, Reynolda House Museum of American Art

== External video ==
Asher Brown Durand

== See also ==
- List of Hudson River School artists
