= On the Beach =

On the Beach may refer to:

== Fiction ==
- On the Beach (novel), a 1957 novel by Nevil Shute
  - On the Beach (1959 film), an American adaptation of Shute's novel, by Stanley Kramer
  - On the Beach (2000 film), an American-Australian television film based on Shute's novel, by Russell Mulcahy
- "On the Beach" (ER), a 2002 TV episode
- On the Beach, one of two stage plays which make up The Contingency Plan by Steve Waters (2009)
- Death Stranding 2: On the Beach, a 2025 video game developed by Kojima Productions

== Music ==
=== Albums ===
- On the Beach (Chris Rea album) or the title song (see below), 1986
- On the Beach (Neil Young album) or the title song, 1974
- On the Beach, by Phil Cohran and the Artistic Heritage Ensemble, 1968
- On the Beach, by the Paragons, 1967

=== Songs ===
- "On the Beach" (Chris Rea song), 1986
  - covered by York as "O.T.B. (On the Beach)", 1999
- "On the Beach" (Cliff Richard song), 1964
- "On the Beach", by Caroline Polachek for the soundtrack of Death Stranding 2: On The Beach, 2025
- "On the Beach", by the Chameleons from What Does Anything Mean? Basically, 1985
- "On the Beach (In the Summertime)", by the 5th Dimension, 1970

== Other uses ==
- On the Beach (painting), a 1908 oil on canvas painting by Eugen de Blaas
- On the Beach (business), a UK-based travel retailer
- On the beach (nautical), a Royal Navy term for "retired from the Service"
