= Beech (surname) =

Beech is a surname and may refer to:

- Albert Beech (1912–1985), English footballer
- Charlie Beech (born 1987), English rugby union player
- Chris Beech (born 1974), English former footballer
- Chris Beech (footballer, born 1975), English former footballer
- David Beech (born 1954), curator of the British Library's philatelic collection
- Elaine Beech (born 1960), American politician
- Graham Beech (died 1993), English rower
- Hannah Beech, journalist for Time magazine
- Jim Beech, English footballer between 1894 and 1902
- Joseph Beech (1867–1954), American Methodist missionary and educator
- Josh Beech, English singer, songwriter, and musician
- Kenny Beech (born 1958), English former footballer
- Kris Beech (born 1981), Canadian ice hockey player in Sweden
- Loren Beech (born 2002), American singer and social media personality
- Mark Beech (writer), English writer and rock critic
- Matt Beech (born 1972), American former Major League Baseball pitcher
- Olive Ann Beech (1904–1993), U.S. aviation pioneer and businesswoman, wife of Walter Beech
- Sandra Beech (born c. 1942), Canadian children's musician
- Terry Beech (born 1980 or 1981), Canadian politician
- Walter Beech (1891–1950), American pioneer aviator
- William George Beech (1898–1971), Canadian politician
