= Beach, Gloucestershire =

Hamlet in Gloucestershire, England

Coordinates: 51.4351°N 2.4259°W

Beach
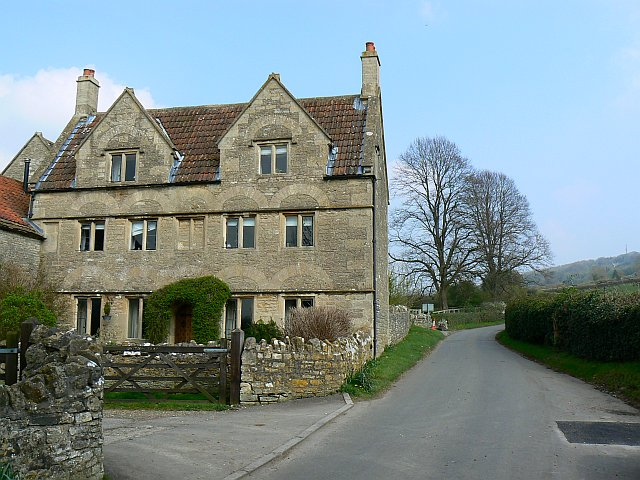
- Brittons Farm, Beach Lane, Beach

- Location within Gloucestershire
- OS grid reference: ST7070
- Unitary authority: South Gloucestershire
- Ceremonial county: Gloucestershire
- Region: South West
- Country: England
- Sovereign state: United Kingdom
- Police: Avon and Somerset
- Fire: Avon
- Ambulance: South Western
- UK Parliament: North East Somerset and Hanham

Beach is a hamlet in South Gloucestershire, England, in the parish of Bitton, on the lower northern slopes of Lansdown Hill. It is about 1 mile north-west of Upton Cheyney. Beach was designated as a conservation area on 23 October 1989.

Beach consists of about eight traditional stone properties informally positioned along Beach Lane, mostly set back from the lane in their own grounds. Britton's Farm is the major property in the village. Formerly much of the village and surrounding area was part of the Beach House estate.

During the English Civil War the Battle of Lansdowne was fought, on 5 July 1643, in fields nearby Beach.

A Forest of Avon Trust community woodland, The Retreat, is to the east of the village. The Retreat was planted in 2000 under a Millennium Commission programme, and previously managed by the Woodland Trust.
