= Little Beach, Portland =

Beach in Dorset, England

Coordinates: 50.5486°N 2.4167°W

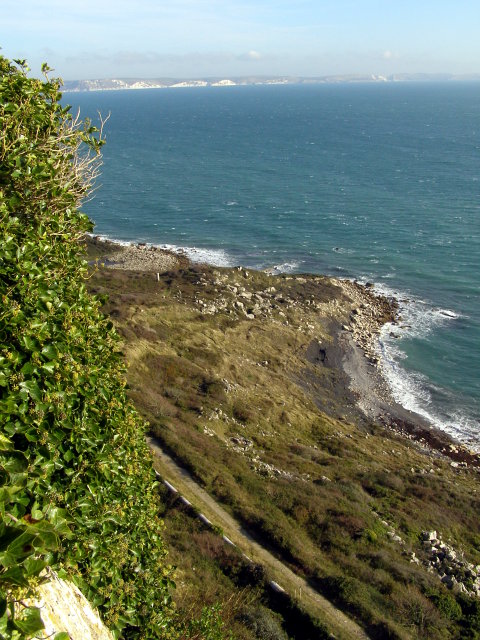
Little Beach seen on the right, with the exposed Kimmeridge Clay behind it.

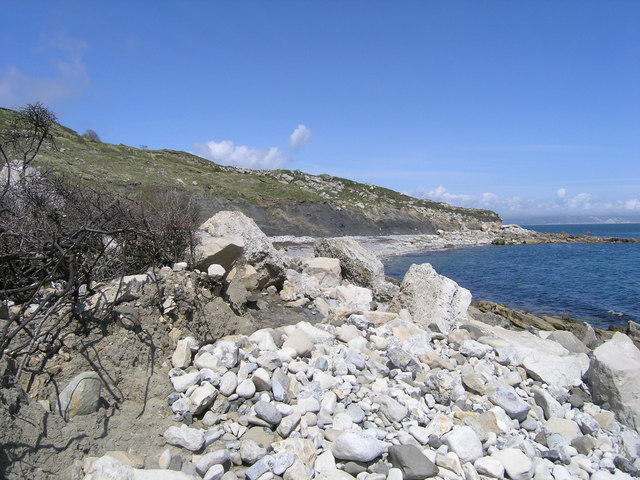
Little Beach seen from further south along the coastline.

Little Beach is a small secluded beach on the eastern side of the Isle of Portland, Dorset, England; part of the Jurassic Coast. It is found at East Weares, below Grove Point, and is found in close proximity of the two Salt Pans. The East Weares area, including Little Beach, has been labelled a Site of Special Scientific Interest (SSSI), largely due to the surrounding scrub and wildlife being of high nature conservation value.

Along with Church Ope Cove further south along the eastern side of Portland, Little Beach is one of the few beaches on Portland. However unlike Church Ope, Little Beach is often undisturbed.

As part of the anti-invasion measures during World War II, a minefield was placed above Little Beach, amongst other sites across East Weares. It formed part of the Isle of Portland Defences and Dorset Coastal Defences and was laid out in 1940-41.

== Access ==
Little Beach can be reached via a pathway veering off the official coastal path of the East Weares area. A similar pathway further north links to the Salt Pans, and the remains of the Folly Pier Waterworks. The beach can also be reached via the coastline edge as well.
