= Folly Pier =

Disused stone shipping quay in Dorset, England

Coordinates: 50.5533°N 2.4175°W

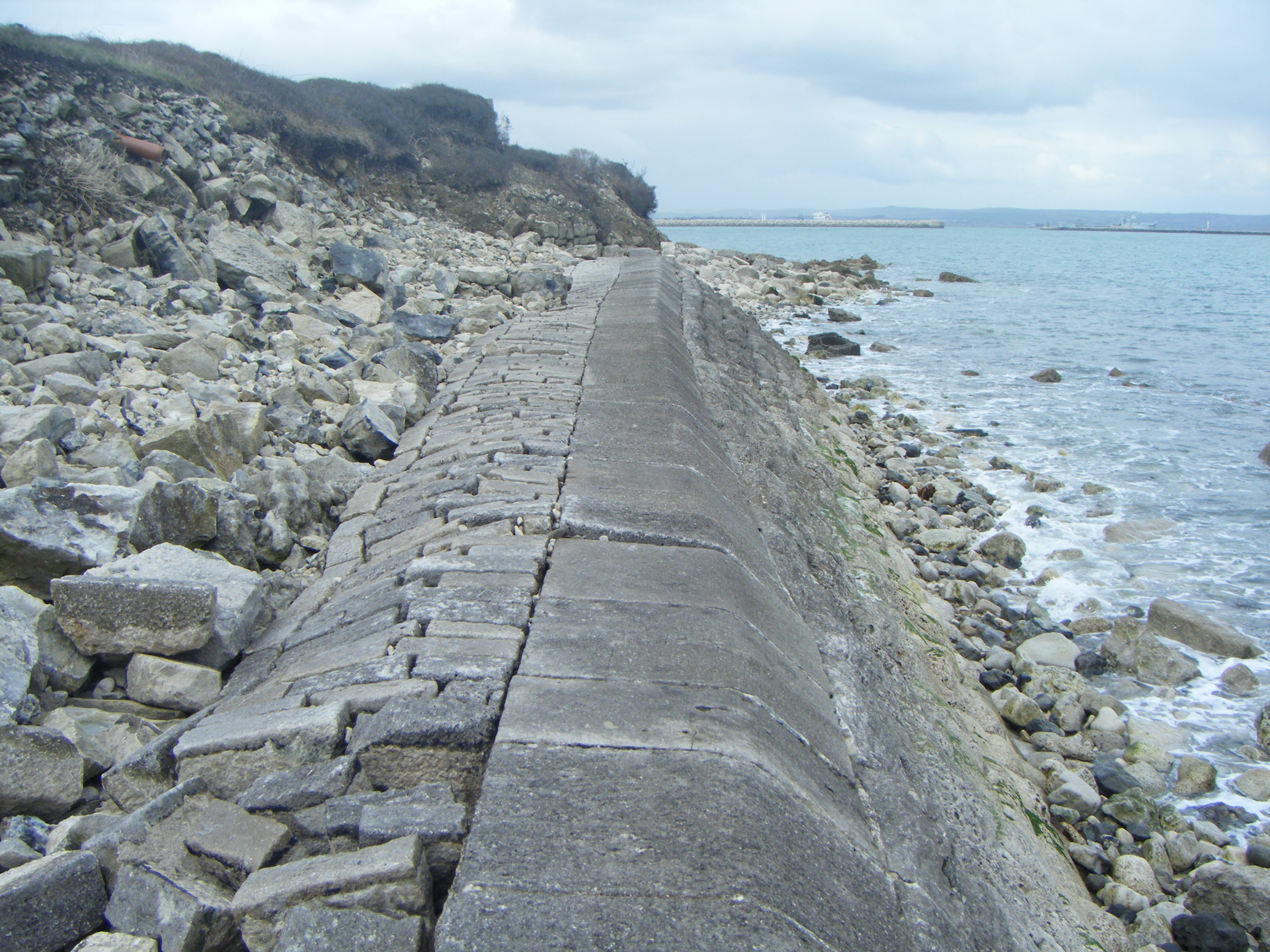
The sea wall of Folly Pier Waterworks, with the remains of Folly Pier beyond.

Folly Pier is a disused stone shipping quay, located on the Isle of Portland, Dorset, England; part of the Jurassic Coast. It is found on the east side of the island within the area of East Weares. Other piers within the area include King's Pier and Durdle Pier respectively. Folly Pier dates from the 17th century.

== History ==
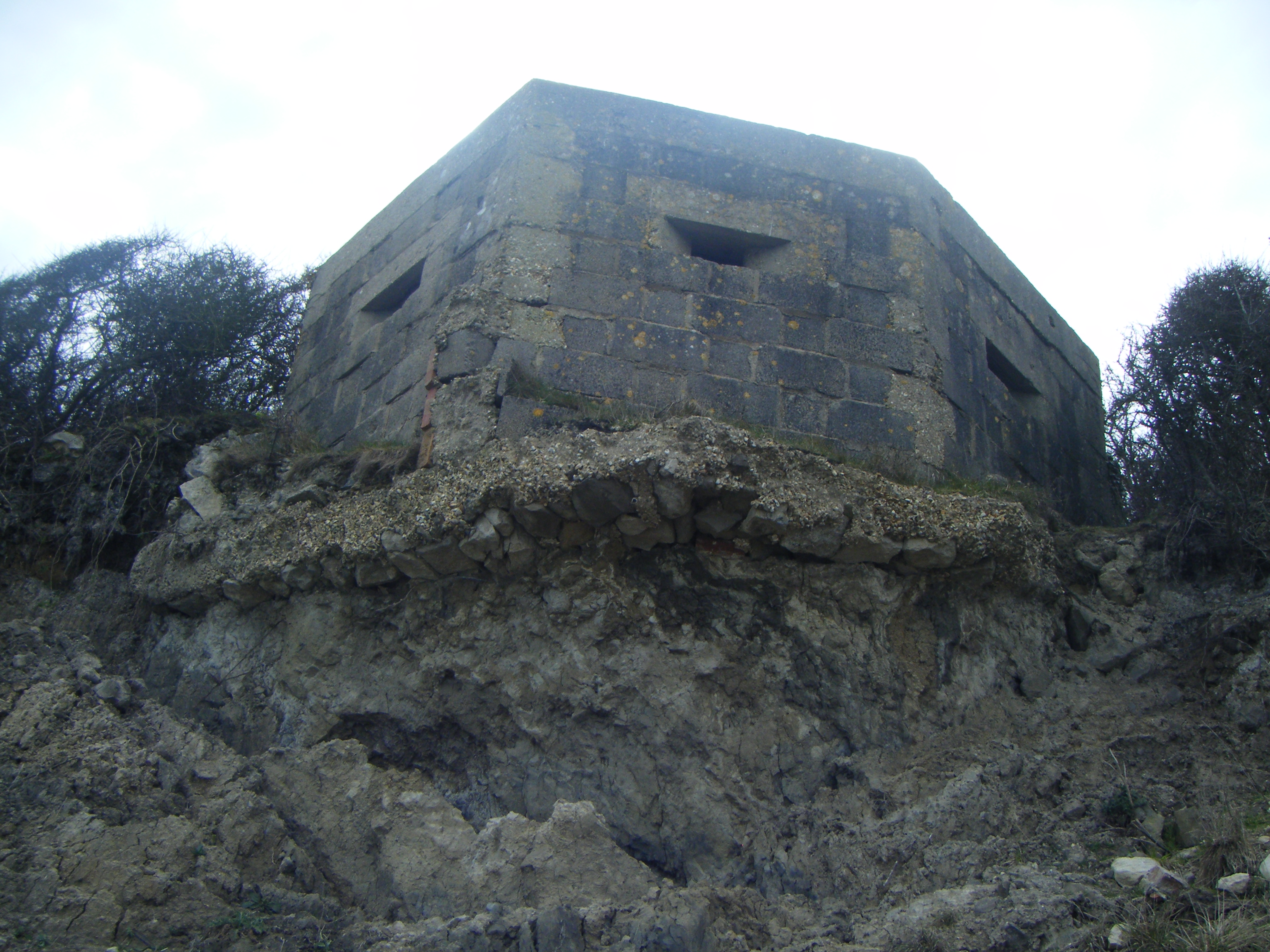
A World War II pillbox at Folly Pier.

Folly Pier was once known as Old Pier, and was one of the main stone shipping places on the east side of Portland. The pier had been destroyed by the sea during the mid-18th century, but by 1765, a new pier on the site had been built.

The limestone quarries of East and Penn's Weares were the location of Sir Christopher Wren's first workings for stone to rebuild London after the Great Fire of 1666. The stone was shipped from the adjacent Durdle, Folly, and King's Piers. Once quarrying in the area was reduced, and quarries moved inland from the cliffs, the pier fell out of use, and any cranes were removed.

The surrounding area was chosen for the site of Folly Pier Waterworks, which was built in 1855 by John Coode for the government. In addition to the pier and waterworks, a World War II pillbox is also located near the shoreline, next to pier.
