= The Catskills (painting) =

1859 painting by Asher Brown Durand

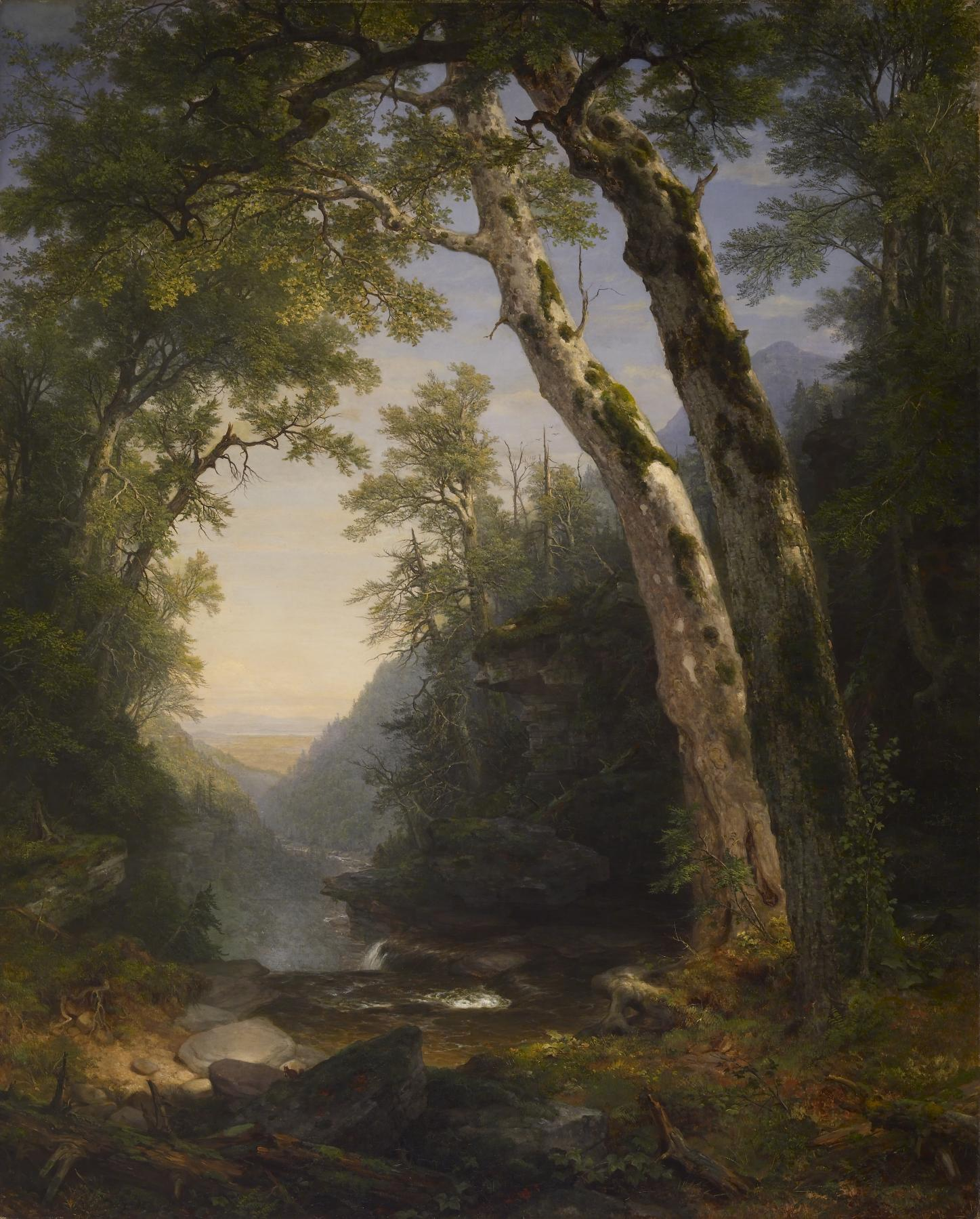
- Artist: Asher Brown Durand
- Year: 1859
- Medium: oil on canvas
- Dimensions: 158.8 cm × 128.3 cm (62.5 in × 50.5 in)
- Location: The Walters Art Museum; Baltimore

The Catskills by Asher Brown Durand, an American engraver, portraitist, and landscape artist, was commissioned by William Thompson Walters in 1858.

== History ==
Asher Brown Durand, known for his skill as an engraver and portraitist, left this career path in 1837 to pursue landscape painting. He was persuaded by his friend and fellow artist, Thomas Cole, who lived in the Catskill region. Durand, who resided in New York, corresponded with Cole and wrote in one of his letters, "now, if there be a man on earth whose location I envy... it is Thomas Cole". During the summer months Durand would often go on expeditions in search of beauty and the Catskills were one of the areas he often explored.

The Catskills, completed in 1859, reflects the Transcendental philosophy of Ralph Waldo Emerson. This style was consistent with the Hudson River School, to which Durand was a founding member. It is also noted that after Durand's return from Europe in 1841, his landscapes reflect influence by the European painters Claude Lorrain and John Constable.

== Composition ==
In the foreground two large trees are presented, one a black birch and the other a sycamore. A stream falls over a cliff and then winds through the valley toward the sunny area in the distance. A squirrel crouching on a rock is the only sign of animate life, representing the loneliness of the scene.

== Exhibition history ==
- Romanticism in America. Baltimore Museum of Art, Baltimore. 1940.
- Highlights from the Collection. The Walters Art Gallery, Baltimore. 1998-2001.
- The American Artist as Painter and Draftsman. The Walters Art Museum, Baltimore. 2001.
- Kindred Spirits: Asher B. Durand and the American Landscape. Brooklyn Museum, Brooklyn; Smithsonian American Art Museum, Washington; San Diego Museum Of Art, San Diego. 2007-2008.
- 19th Century Masterpieces from the Walters Art Museum. Santa Barbara Museum of Art, Santa Barbara; Jack S. Blanton Museum of Art, Austin. 2010-2011.
