= Bettering the Evaluation and Care of Health =

Australian government healthcare evaluation system

Bettering the Evaluation and Care of Health (BEACH) is a system established in April 1988 by the Australian Department of Health in order to "provide a reliable and valid data collection process for general practice". It fulfils the first of the General Practice Statistics and Classification Unit (GPSCU)'s objectives, namely to fill the void existing in 1997 in data about general practice.

After 18 years of data collection from 1998 to 2016, BEACH contained almost 1.8 million GP-patient encounter records, and was described by the University of Sydney as "the most valid, reliable GP dataset in Australia", "proven to be nationally representative of patients at all Medicare-claimed GP services". At this point, data collection had ceased, but the resource is maintained by the University of Sydney, to which requests for analysis of any topic should be directed.

BEACH data describe GP-patient encounters, with data linkages between indication and patient management, making them suitable for research into primary healthcare delivery or specific health problems, and to inform pricing and strategy. According to the website:

The program has generated or contributed to several hundred academic publications and grant applications. It has provided data and reports to industry, government and not-for-profit organisations. It has been used to support health system planning, policy development, development of educational material and to inform marketing and pricing business decisions.
