= Beach, Georgia =

Unincorporated community in Georgia, USA

Coordinates: 31°26′24″N 82°30′13″W

Beach is an unincorporated community in Ware County, in the U.S. state of Georgia.

== History ==
A post office called Beach was established in 1890, and remained in operation until 1930. In 1900, the community had 250 inhabitants.
