= East Weare Rifle Range =

Disused rifle range of the Royal Navy on the Isle of Portland, England

Coordinates: 50.5532°N 2.4210°W

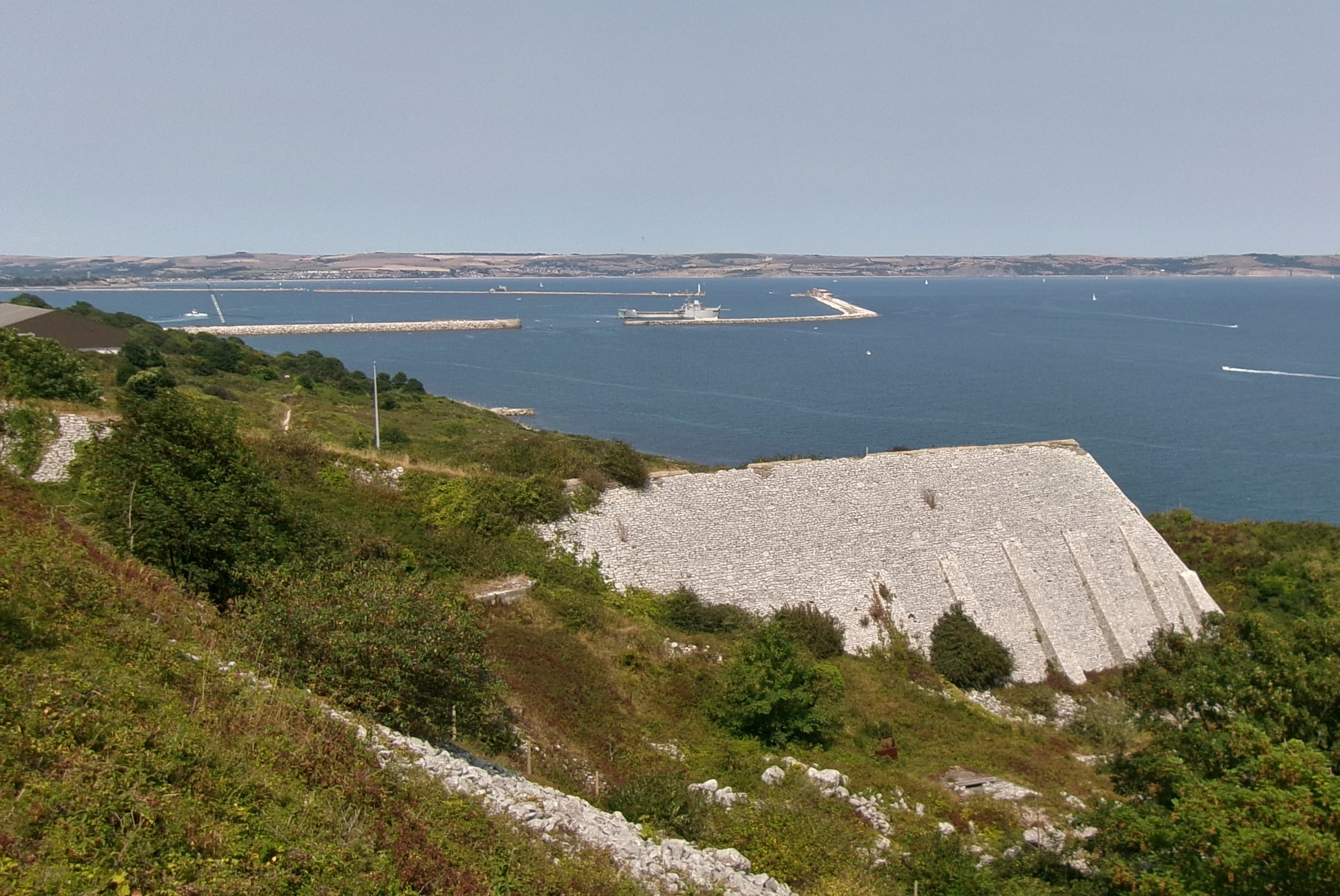
Stop butt structure of the East Weares Rifle Range.

East Weare Rifle Range is a disused naval rifle range on the Isle of Portland, Dorset, England. It is located within the area of East Weares, overlooking Portland Harbour. The range became a scheduled monument in October 2015, which included the stop butt of Portland stone, the marker's gallery and 100-yard firing position. It remains on the private property of Portland Port Ltd, and has not been opened to the public, however can be seen from surrounding coastal paths.

The range was not the only one of its kind on the island. A rifle and revolver range was once located near King's Pier, while a late 20th-century light automatic range was also located nearby.

== History ==
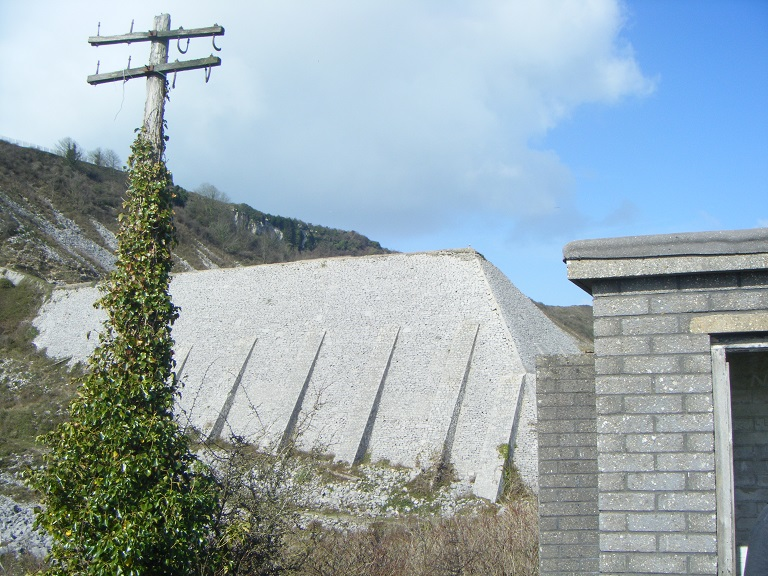
Stop butt structure, including a disused telegraph pole and part of sentry lookout post.

The East Weare Rifle Range was built at the beginning of the 20th century on land the war department purchased. It was built as part of the general development of the naval base and its training provisions, where it was used to train naval and other military service personnel. Due to its close proximity to the railway line of the Portland Branch Railway, red flags would be hoisted whenever the range was in use.

The range ceased operating during the 1980s after the government reviewed all active firing ranges in the UK and classed Portland's range as dangerous due to the public footpaths surrounding it. Today, the range remains a reminder of the military presence at Portland. The surrounding area is designated a Site of Special Scientific Interest (SSSI). In 2007, ten British Primitive goats were released into the area to control the scrub.

== Design ==
The large stop butt is located at the south-east end of the range, and measures approximately 100 metres in length and 30 metres wide. The marker's gallery, situated on the opposite side, survives in reasonable condition. It held the Hythe pattern target frame which was used to raise and lower the targets. The range had firing points, earth and stone-built mounds, at 100 yard intervals from 100 yards to 600 yards, with an additional lane of fire to the north-east, firing from 800 yards. Today, only the 100 and 200 yard positions survive.

Within proximity of the rifle range are two remaining sentry posts, where lookouts would warn away walkers when shooting was taking place. An observation post also remains above the range on the clifftop. There are also two World War II pillboxes within the range's perimeter.

== Gallery ==
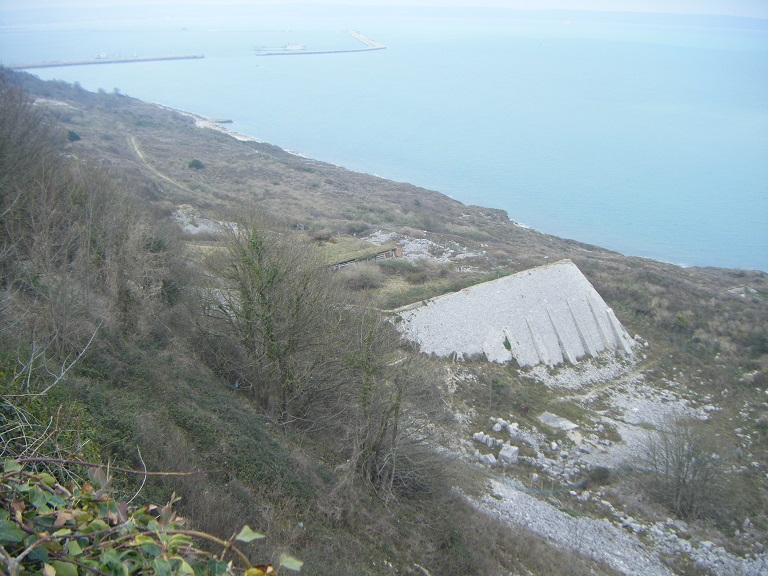
The range from the clifftop coast path of East Weares.

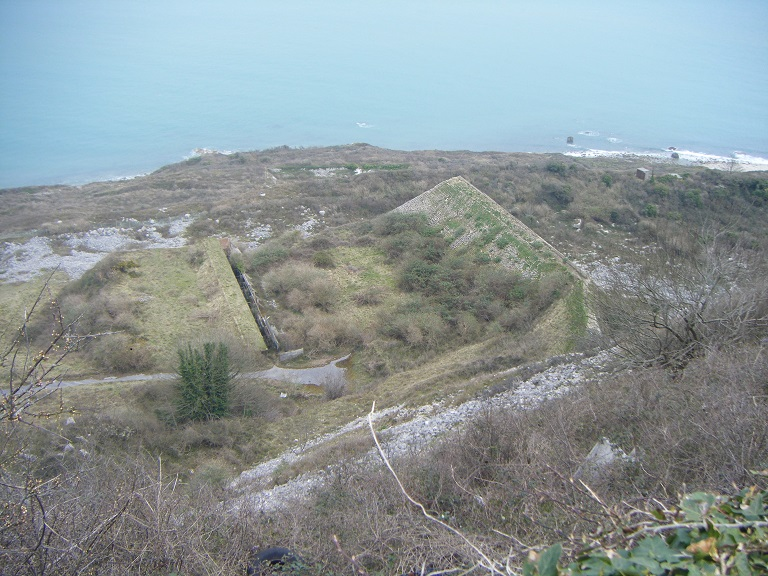
The range's back stop and markers' gallery from the clifftop path.

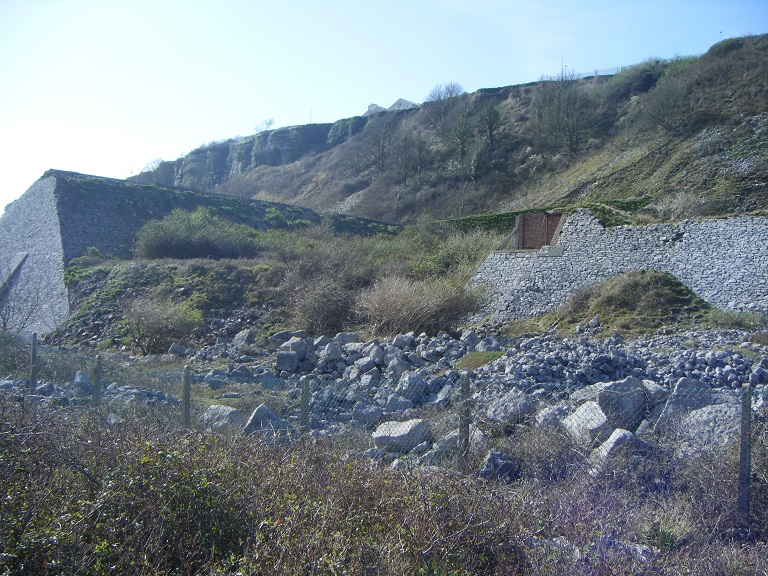
The side of the rifle range.

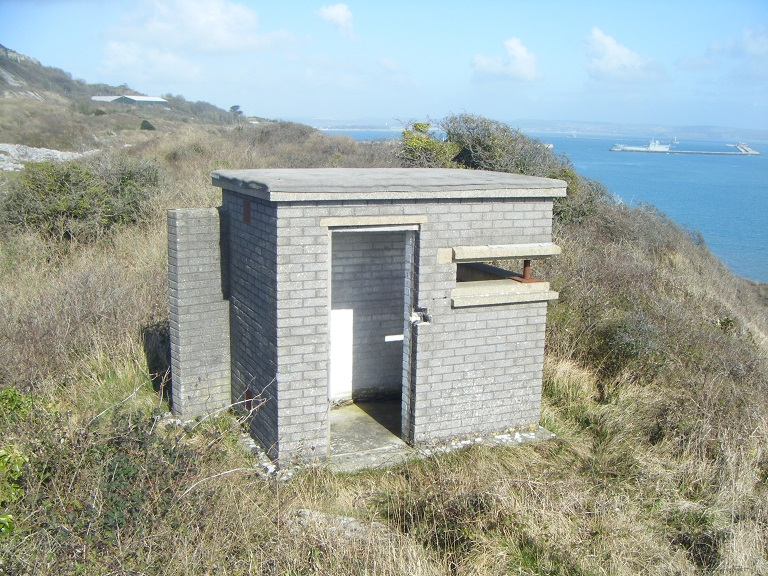
One of the surviving sentry posts.
