= Folly Pier Waterworks =

19th-century waterworks on the Isle of Portland, Dorset, England

Coordinates: 50.5535°N 2.4187°W

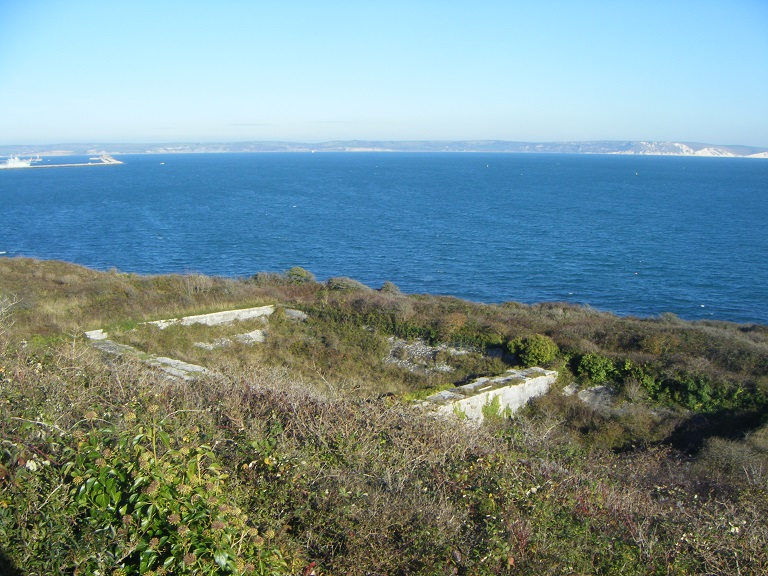
Folly Pier Waterworks seen up close.

Folly Pier Waterworks was a 19th-century waterworks on the Isle of Portland, Dorset, England. It was located at East Weares, the east side of Portland, below HM Prison Portland, which it supplied water for. Today, only the foundations and walls of the reservoirs survive. The waterworks was named after Folly Pier, a pier once used for the transporting of Portland stone by sea.

== History ==
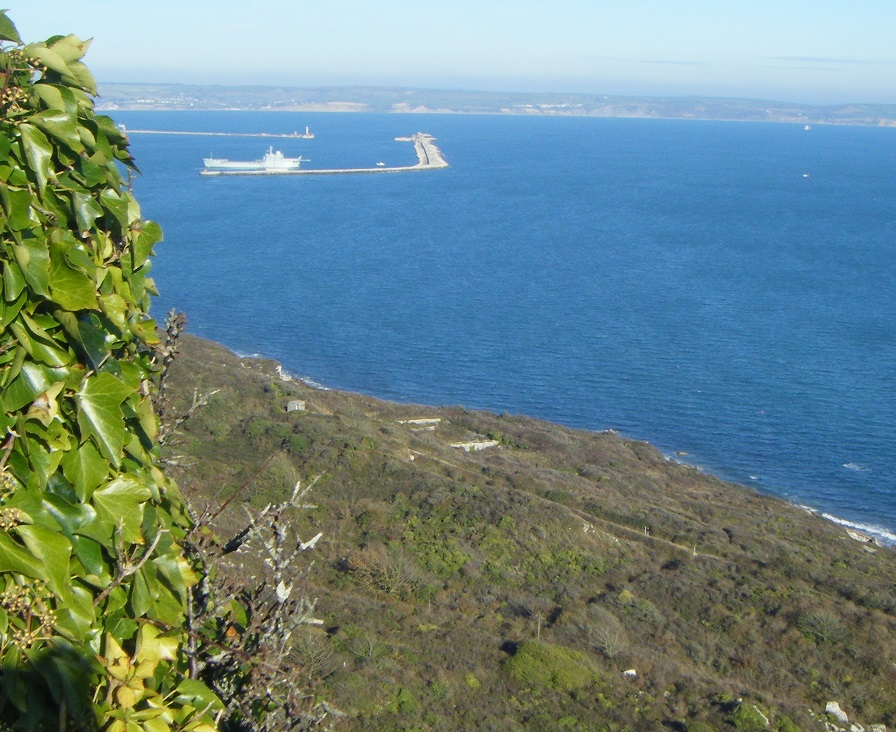
Folly Pier Waterworks seen from the cliff tops.

Construction of the breakwaters of Portland Harbour commenced in 1849, along with the various fortifications including the Verne Citadel. HM Prison Portland was established in 1848 to provide convict labour for these works. As the island's traditional water supply, using springs an wells, was not sufficient for the government works, the Admiralty tasked Chief Engineer John Coode to build Folly Pier Waterworks and its large reservoir, along with a pumping station on the clifftop at Cheyne. The waterworks supplied the prison above and acted as an intermediary by receiving and managing water from the pumping station. Separate reservoir tanks allowed both rainwater and seawater to be held.

The waterworks was later closed due to an outbreak of typhoid which killed several prisoners. After the prison was converted into a Borstal in 1921, the remaining reservoir tanks of the then-demolished waterworks was used as swimming pools from the late 1920s. However, in 1933, one of the Borstal Boys drowned during a swimming event and this caused all swimming to be banned at the reservoirs. A swimming pool was later built within the prison complex. The surviving reservoirs have largely been reclaimed by nature. One of the remaining reservoirs acts now as a pond.

== Gallery ==
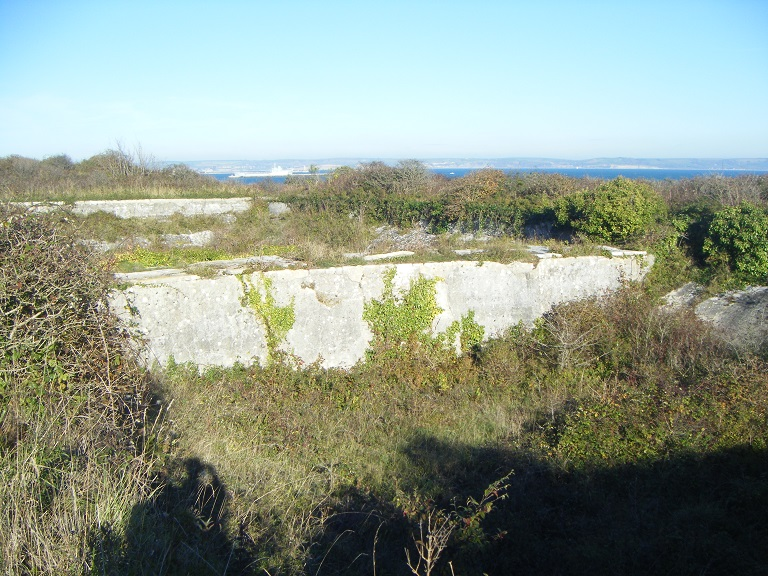
Another large section of the remains.

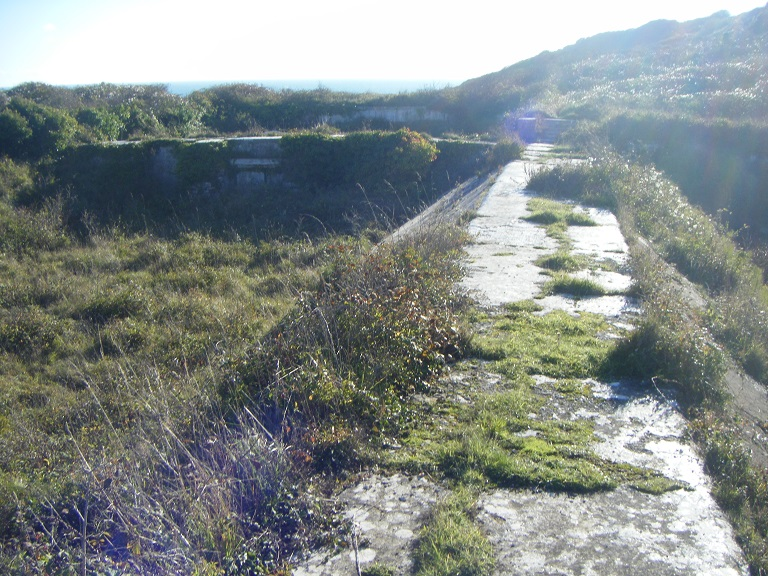
The centre area of the remains.

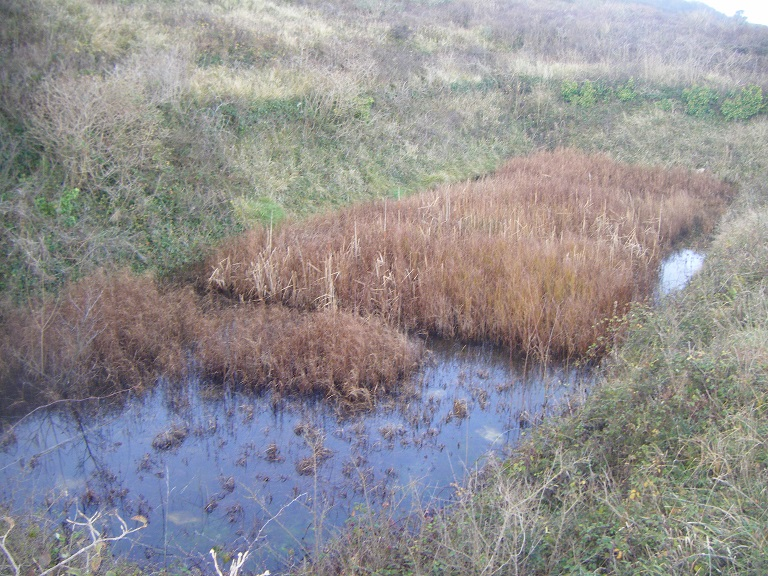
Reeds growing in a pond-like area of the ruins.
