= The Beach (water park) =

Former water park in Albuquerque, New Mexico

- Interactive map of The Beach
- Location: Albuquerque, New Mexico, United States
- Coordinates: 35.13233°N 106.613087°W
- Status: Defunct
- Opened: 1987
- Closed: 2005

Attractions
- Water rides: 10

The Beach was a 14-acre water park in Albuquerque, New Mexico. The park was started in 1987, its final open season was 2004, and it was closed in 2005. The park's land was put up for sale in 2014. When the park was active, the three 75-foot slides used to tower over Interstate 25.

== Attractions ==
- Wave Pool – the main feature of the park was a 700,000 gallon pool that generated ocean-like waves.
- Kiddie Pool – a miniature version of the park for kids, it had slides, a kiddie lazy river, a waterfall, a water umbrella, and a big purple dinosaur
- Lazy River – a tube-ride river like oval that circled the vast majority of the park, it had multiple stops, at the kiddie pool, wave pool, slides, bathhouse and an ice cream shop.
- 4 and 8 Foot Tube-Slides – these were both slides that ran downhill. The four foot slide was a narrower slide with a faster current, the eight foot slide was a wider slide with a slower current.
- The Silver Bullet - a body-slide that accommodated smaller children than their tower slides.
- The Black Hole - a body-slide that was encompassed by a darkened tunnel, it led to a 3-foot deep catch pool.
- The Plunge - a 75-foot "free-fall style" body-slide that led to a 3-foot deep catch pool.
- The Scream – a 75-foot open slide with less-intense drop than The Plunge.
- The Rolling Thunder - a 75-foot fully enclosed body slide with twists and turns.
