= Frederic Edwin Church =

American landscape painter (1826–1900)

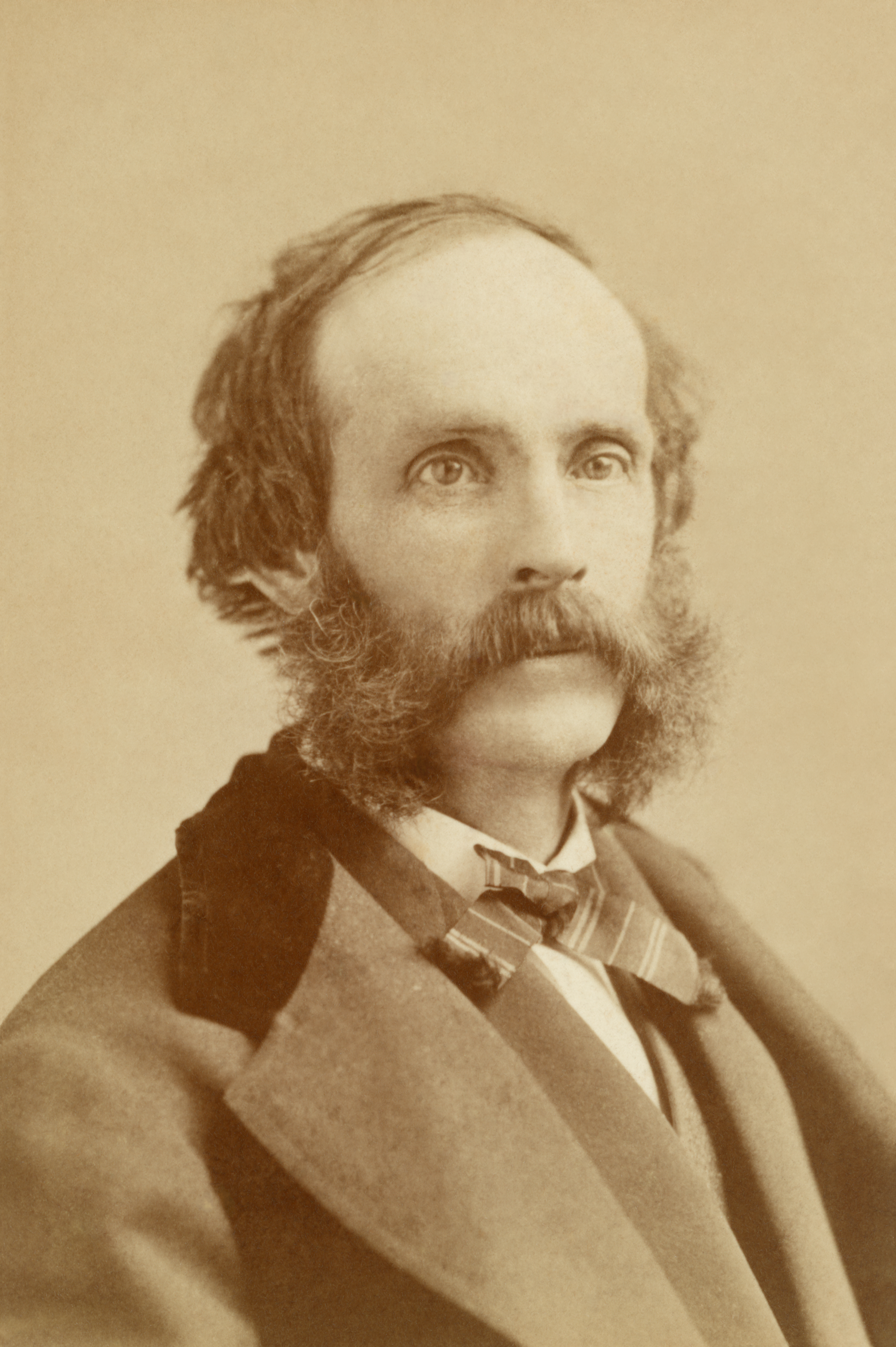
- c. 1868 photograph by Napoleon Sarony
- Born: May 4, 1826; Hartford, Connecticut, U.S.
- Died: April 7, 1900 (aged 73); New York City, U.S.
- Known for: Landscape painting
- Notable work: Niagara, The Heart of the Andes
- Movement: Hudson River School

Frederic Edwin Church (May 4, 1826 – April 7, 1900) was an American landscape painter born in Hartford, Connecticut. He was a central figure in the Hudson River School of American landscape painters, best known for painting large landscapes, often depicting mountains, waterfalls, and sunsets. Church's paintings put emphasis on realistic detail, dramatic light, and panoramic views. He debuted some of his major works in single-painting exhibitions to a paying and often enthralled audience in New York City. In his prime, he was one of the most famous painters in the United States.

== Beginnings ==
Frederic Edwin Church was a direct descendant of Richard Church, a Puritan pioneer from England who accompanied Thomas Hooker on the original journey through the wilderness from Massachusetts to what would become Hartford, Connecticut. Church was the son of Eliza (1796–1883) and Joseph Church (1793–1876). Frederic had two sisters and no surviving brothers. His father was successful in business as a silversmith and jeweler and was a director at several financial firms. His mother's brother was Adrian Janes, who owned an iron foundry that constructed the U.S. Capitol Dome. The family's wealth allowed Frederic to pursue his interest in art from a very early age. In 1844, aged 18, Church became the pupil of landscape artist Thomas Cole in Catskill, New York after Daniel Wadsworth, a family neighbor and founder of the Wadsworth Athenaeum in Hartford, Connecticut, introduced the two. Church studied with him for two years; by this time his talent was evident. Cole wrote that Church had "the finest eye for drawing in the world". During his time with Cole he traveled around New England and New York to make sketches, visiting East Hampton, Connecticut, Long Island, Catskill Mountain House, The Berkshires, New Haven, Connecticut, and Vermont. His first recorded sale was in 1846 to the Wadsworth Athenaeum for $130; it was a pastoral painting depicting Hooker's journey in 1636.

In 1848, he was elected the youngest Associate of the National Academy of Design. He was promoted to full member the following year and began to take in his own students including Walter Launt Palmer, William James Stillman and Jervis McEntee.

== Style and influences ==
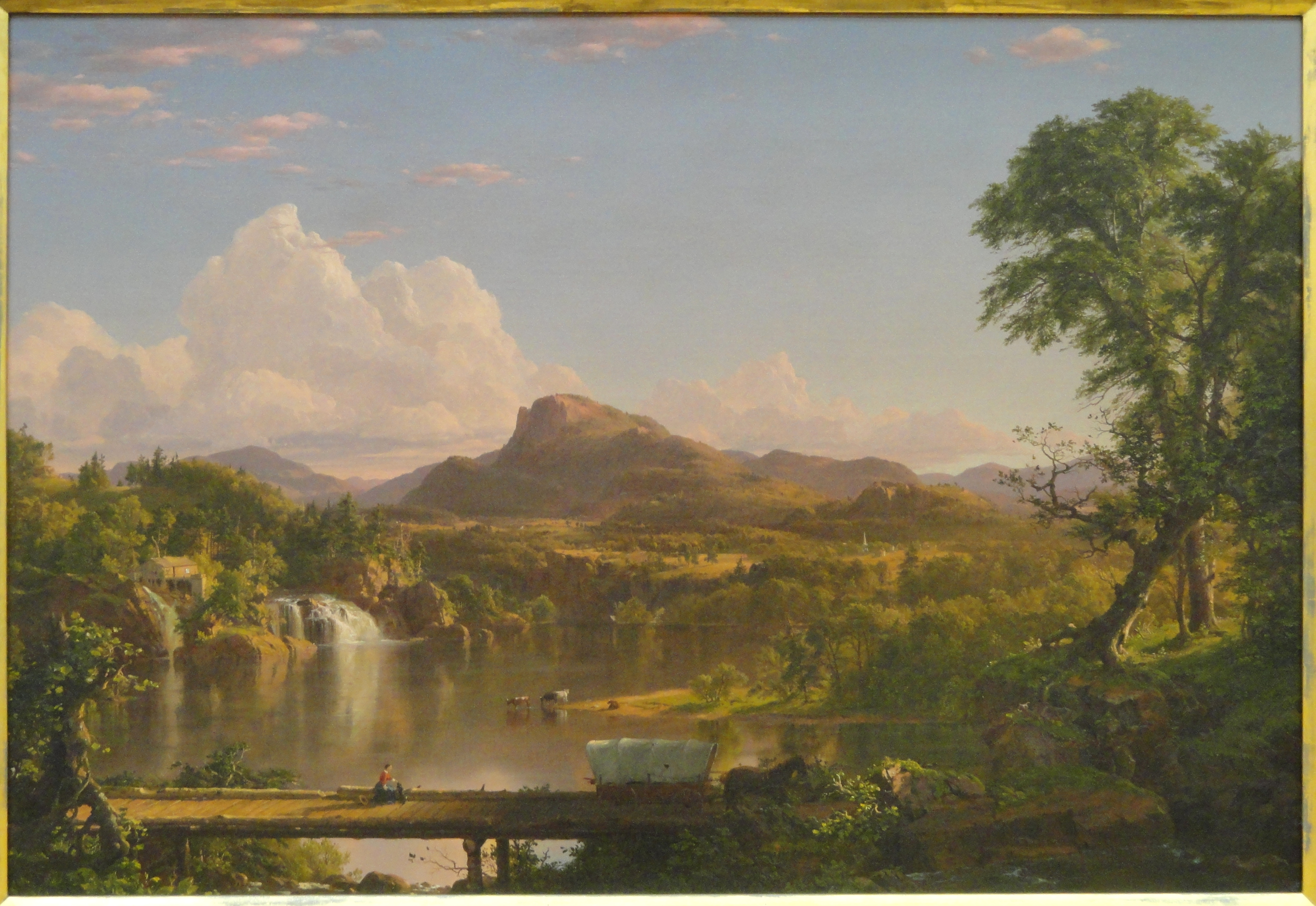
New England Scenery (1851) was Church's "first true composite landscape"—it used sketches from various locations to develop a more detailed and spatially complex landscape than found in Cole's work.

Romanticism was prominent in Britain and France in the early 1800s as a counter-movement to the rationalism of the Age of Enlightenment. Artists of the Romantic period often depicted nature in idealized scenes that depicted the richness and beauty of nature, sometimes with emphasis on its grand scale. This tradition carried on in the works of Church, who idealizes an uninterrupted nature in intricate detail. The emphasis on nature is encouraged by low horizontal lines and a preponderance of sky. Church usually "hid" his brushstrokes so that the painting surface was smooth and the painter's hand evident by accuracy and control, rather than by the conspicuous mark making prevalent in later eras.

Church was the product of the second generation of the Hudson River School, a movement in American landscape art founded by his teacher Thomas Cole. Both Cole and Church were devout Protestants, and the latter's beliefs played a role in his paintings, especially his early canvases. Hudson River School paintings were characterized by their focus on traditional pastoral settings, especially the Catskill Mountains, and their Romantic qualities. They attempted to capture the wild realism of an unsettled America that was quickly disappearing, and the appreciation of natural beauty. His American frontier landscapes show the "expansionist and optimistic outlook of the United States in the mid-nineteenth century." Church differed from Cole in the topics of his paintings: he preferred natural and often majestic scenes over Cole's propensity towards allegory—though Church's work has increasingly been re-examined in terms of themes and meanings.

The Prussian explorer and scientist Alexander von Humboldt was a major influence on Church. In his Kosmos, Humboldt put forth a vision of the interconnectedness of science, the natural world, and spiritual concerns. Kosmos, which Church owned, dedicated a chapter to landscape painting; Humboldt gave an important role to the visual artist in "scientifically" portraying the diversity of nature, especially in the New World. As Charles Darwin's theory of evolution began to overturn Humboldt's ideas of unity in the 1860s, art historians have examined how Church's painting responded to this disruption in Church's world view.

The English art critic John Ruskin was another important and big influence on Church. In Ruskin's Modern Painters, he emphasizes the close observation of nature: "the imperative duty of the landscape painter [is] to descend to the lowest details with undiminished attention. Every class of rock, every kind of earth, every form of cloud, must be studied with equal industry, and rendered with equal precision." This attention to detail must be combined with the artist's interpretation, impressions, and imagination to achieve great art. While Church's paintings were widely praised in the 1850s and 1860s, some critics found his detailed panoramas lacking in the imaginative or poetic. In his 1879 American Painters, George W. Sheldon wrote of Church's canvases, "It is scarcely necessary to ... explain what their principal defect is, because, by this time, that defect must have been recognized by almost every intelligent American lover of art. It consists in the elaboration of details at the expense of the unity and force of sentiment.... They are faithful and beautiful, but they are not so rich as they might be in the poetry, the aroma, of art. The higher and spiritual verities of Nature are the true home of landscape art."

Some of Church's paintings relate to, and influenced, the luminist landscape style as well. Luminist art tends to emphasize horizontals, use non-diffuse light, and hide brushstrokes such that the painter's presence, or "personality", is less apparent to the viewer. An exhibition book considers Church's Morning in the Tropics and Twilight in the Wilderness to highlight the style's "meticulous draftsmanship and intense colors", while Cotopaxi and The Parthenon "exemplify the style ... in their panoramic structure". Nevertheless, Church is not considered a primarily luminist artist.

== Career ==
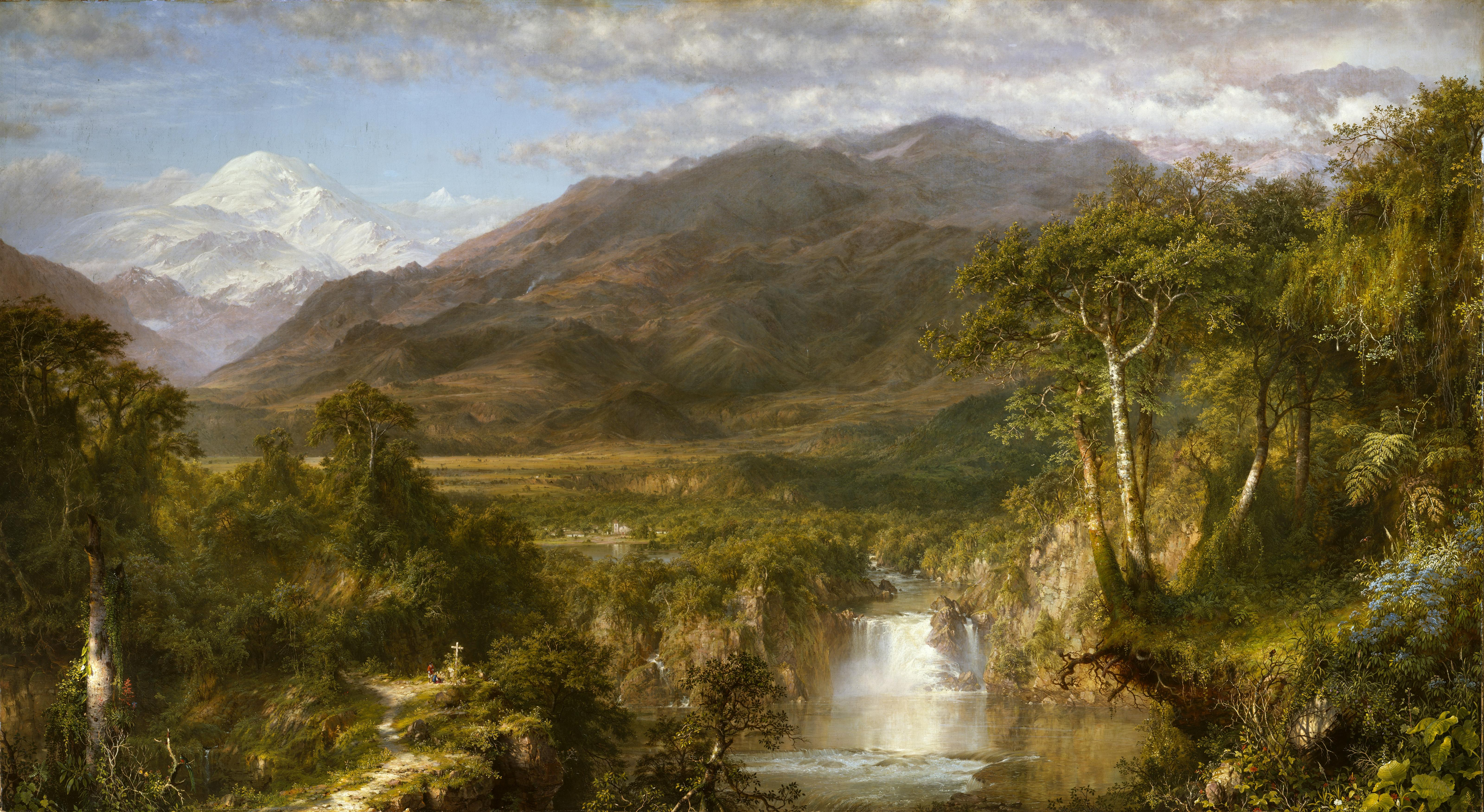
The Heart of the Andes (1859)

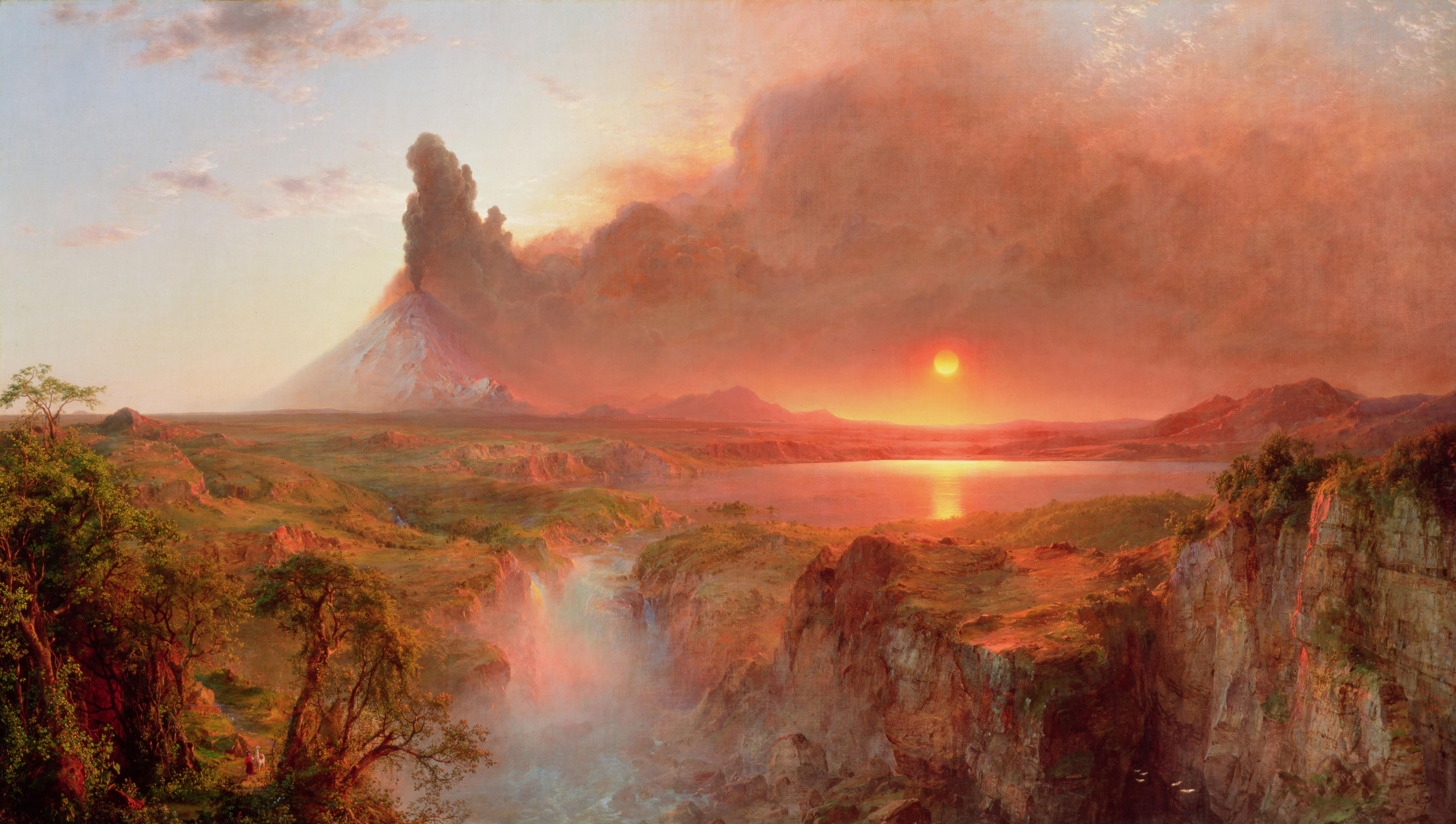
Cotopaxi (1862)

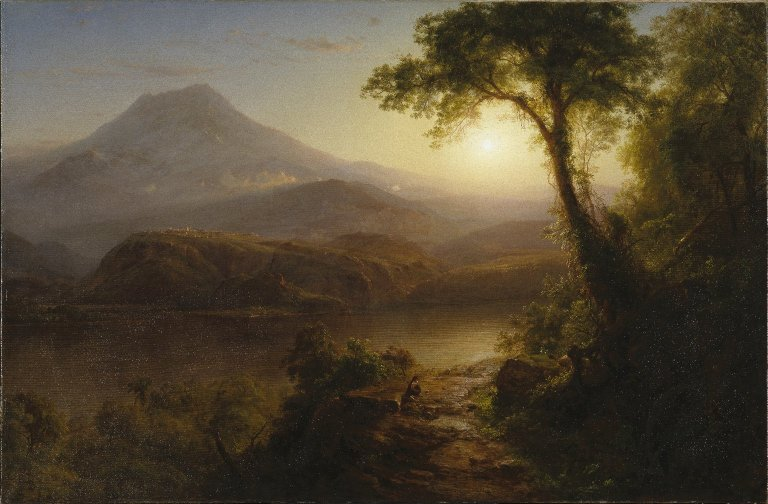
Tropical Scenery (1873)

Church began his career by painting classic Hudson River School scenes of New York and New England, but by 1850, he had settled in New York. He exhibited his art at the American Art Union, the Boston Art Club, and the National Academy of Design. His method consisted of creating paintings in his studio based on sketches in nature. In the earlier years of his career, Church's style was reminiscent of that of his teacher, Thomas Cole, and epitomized the Hudson River School's founding styles. As his style progressed he departed from Cole's approach: he painted in more elaborate detail and his compositions became more adventurous in format, sometimes with dramatic light effects.

Church quickly earned a reputation as a traveler-artist, with early domestic painting and sketching trips to the White Mountains, western Massachusetts, the Catskills, Hartford, Conn, Niagara, Virginia, Kentucky, and Maine. He made two trips to South America in 1853 and 1857 and stayed predominantly in Quito, visiting the volcanoes and cities of modern day Colombia and Ecuador, and crossing the isthmus of Panama. The first trip was with businessman Cyrus West Field, who financed the voyage, hoping to use Church's paintings to lure investors to his South American ventures. Church was inspired by Alexander von Humboldt's exploration of the continent in the early 1800s; Humboldt had challenged artists to portray the "physiognomy" of the Andes. After Humboldt's Personal Narrative of Travels to the Equinoctial Regions of America was published in 1852, Church jumped at the chance to travel and study in Humboldt's footsteps. When Church returned to South America in 1857 with painter Louis Rémy Mignot, he added to his sketches of the area. After both trips, Church had produced a number of landscapes of Ecuador and the Andes, such as The Andes of Ecuador (1855), Cayambe (1858), The Heart of the Andes (1859), and Cotopaxi (1862). The Heart of the Andes, Church's most famous painting, pictures several elements of topography combined into an idealistic, broad portrait of nature. The painting was very large, yet highly detailed; every species of plant and animal is identifiable and numerous climate zones appear at once.

As he had with Niagara before, Church debuted The Heart of the Andes in a single-painting exhibition in New York City in 1859. Thousands of people paid to see the painting, with the painting's huge floor-based frame playing the part of a window looking out on the Andes. The audience sat on benches to view the piece, sometimes using opera glasses to get close, and Church strategically arranged the room to illuminate the painting with the light from overhead skylights. The work was an instant success. Church eventually sold it for $10,000, at that time the highest price ever paid for a work by a living American artist.

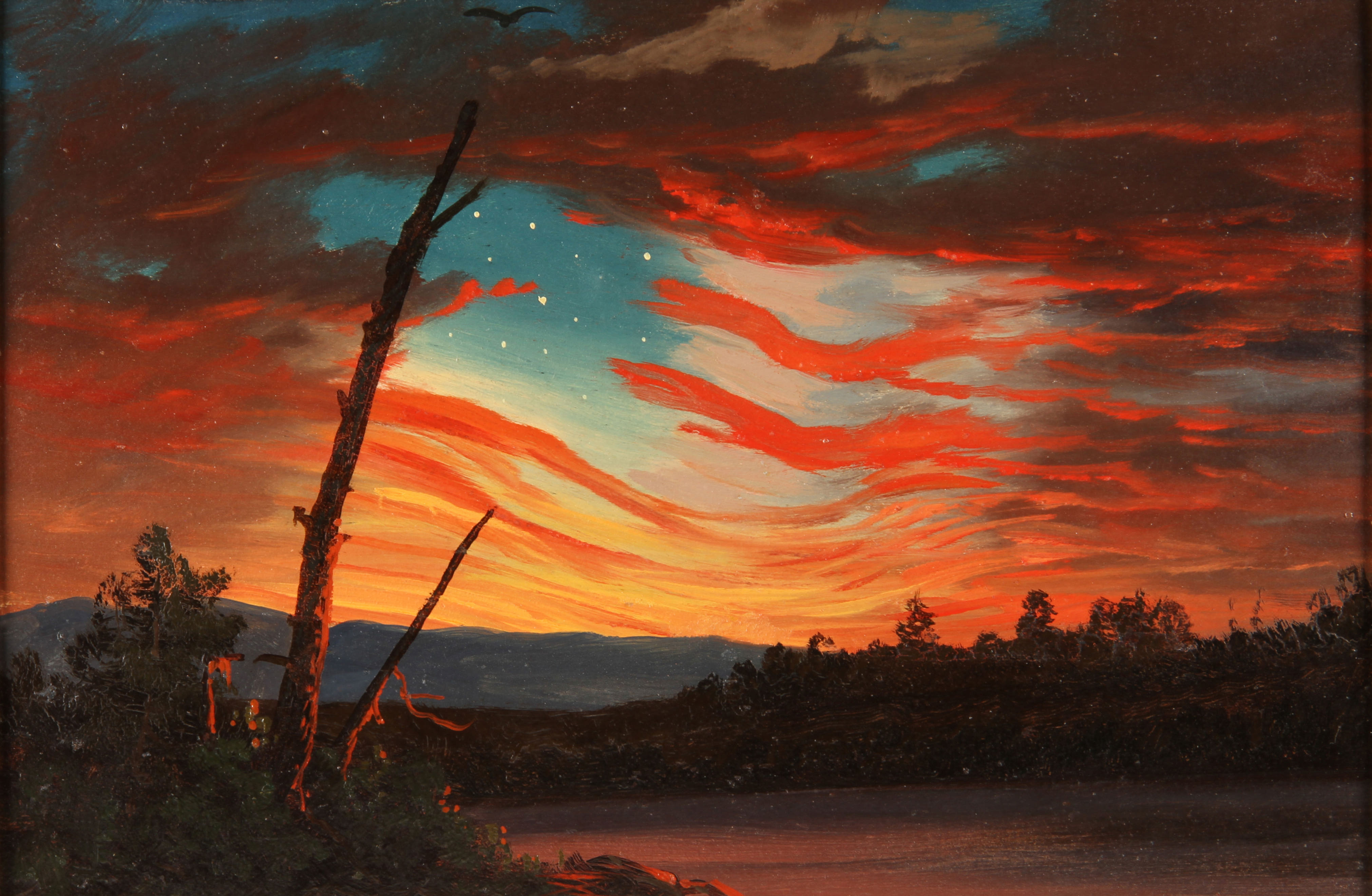
Our Banner in the Sky (1861) both oil and lithograph by Frederick Edwin Church – a colorful sunset interpreted to reflect divine support for the Union during the American Civil War

Church's friendship with Isaac Israel Hayes, a prominent arctic explorer, stimulated the artist's interest in the arctic regions. In 1859, Church and his good friend Rev. Louis Legrand Noble traveled to Newfoundland and Labrador. The journey was chronicled in Noble's book After Icebergs with a Painter (1861), published shortly before Church's painting The Icebergs went on display.

By 1860, Church was the most renowned American artist. In his prime, Church was a commercial as well as an artistic success. Church's art was very lucrative; he was reported to be worth half a million dollars at his death in 1900.

In 1861, at the start of the Civil War, Church was inspired to paint Our Banner in the Sky by a sunset featuring red, white, and blue that he believed was a symbol that "the heavens indicated their support for the United States by reflecting the nation's colors in the setting sun". A lithograph was made from it and sold to benefit the families of Union soldiers.

In 1863, he was elected an Associate Fellow of the American Academy of Arts and Sciences.

In 1870, Church was one of the founding trustees of the Metropolitan Museum of Art, and remained so until his death in 1900.

=== Family, later travels, and Olana ===
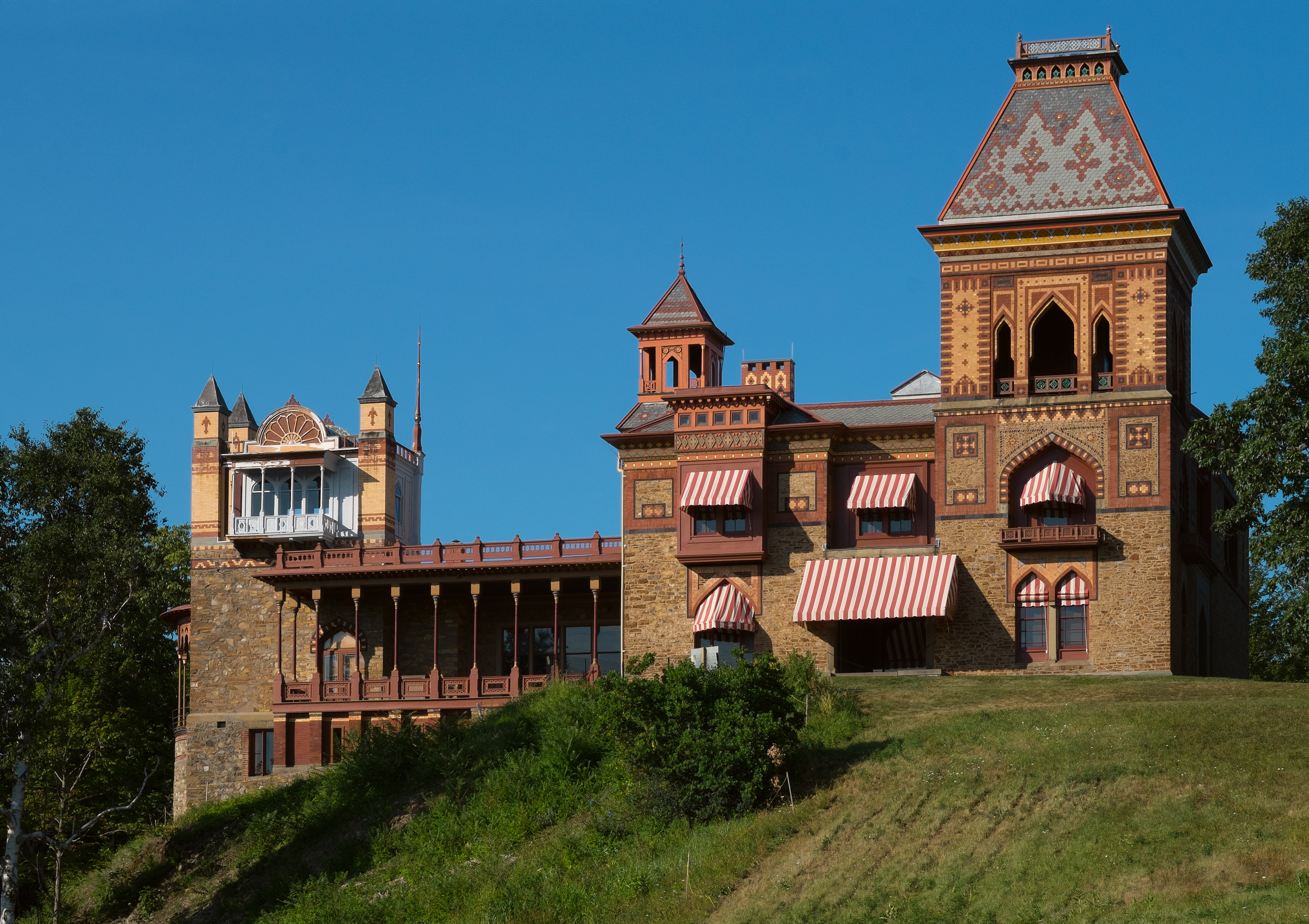
Olana

In 1860, Church bought a farm near Hudson, New York and married Isabel Mortimer Carnes (born 1836, of Dayton, Ohio), whom he had met during the New York exhibition of The Heart of the Andes. They soon started a family, but their two-year-old son Herbert and five-month-old daughter Emma both died of diphtheria in March 1865. Still grief stricken, Church, his wife, and a young artist they befriended traveled to Jamaica. Church sketched while Isabel made a collection of pressed Jamaican ferns. He and his wife started a new family with the birth of Frederic Joseph in 1866, followed by Theodore Winthrop in 1869, Louis Palmer in 1870, and Isabel Charlotte ("Downie") in 1871.

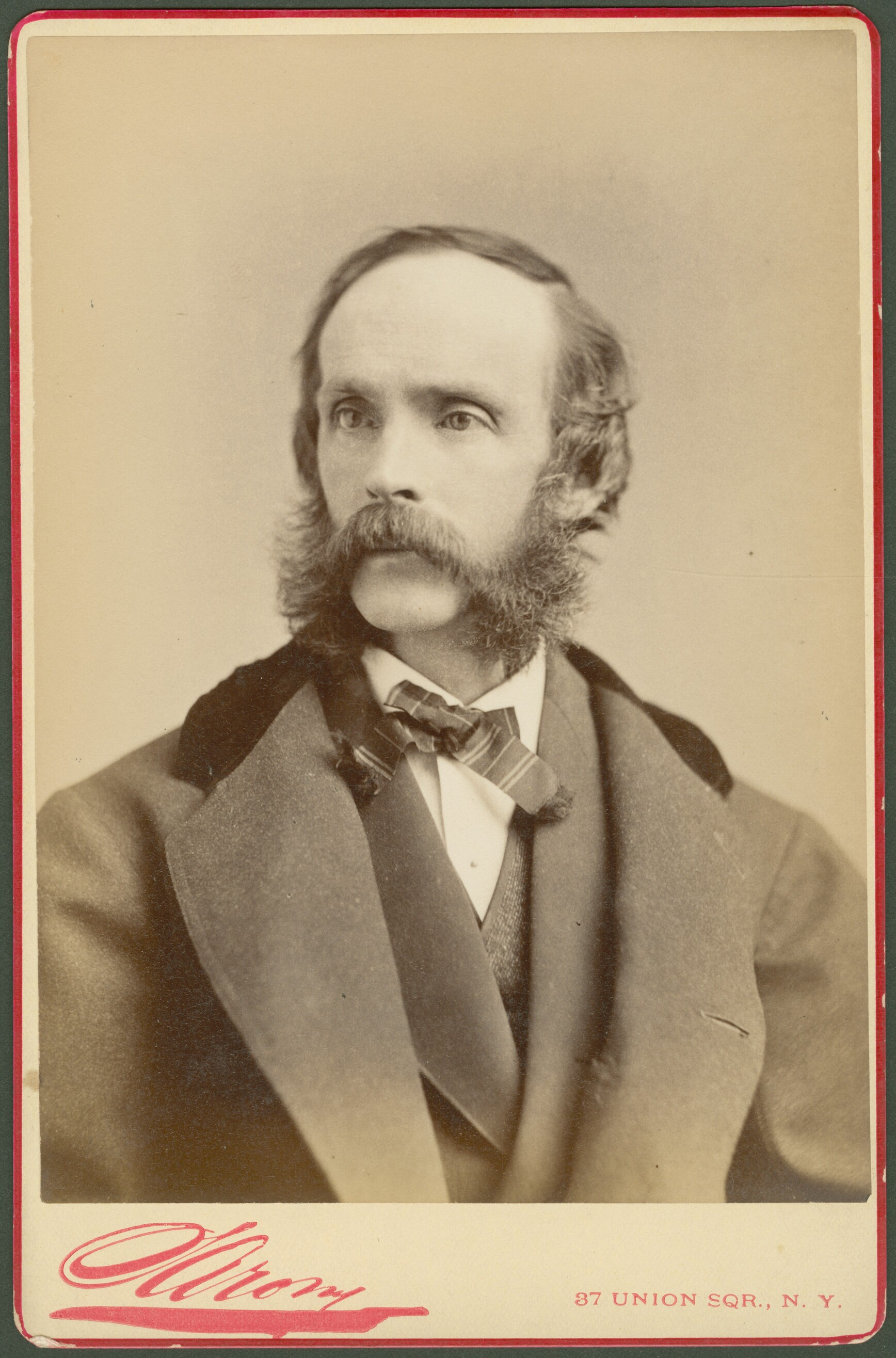
Cabinet card of Church c. 1868 by Napoleon Sarony

In late 1867, Church began the longest period of travel of his career. That fall he and his family went to Europe, moving through London and Paris fairly quickly. From Marseille they went to Alexandria, Egypt, but Church did not visit the pyramids, perhaps being afraid to leave his family alone. Passing through Jaffa, they arrived at Beirut, where they spent four months. They stayed with American missionaries, including David Stuart Dodge. In February 1868 Church travelled with Dodge to the city of Petra by camel from Jerusalem. There he sketched the Al Khazneh tomb, which became the subject of one of his important later works, El Khasné, Petra (1874). Later that spring the family visited Damascus and Baalbek, then sailed the Aegean Sea with a stop in Constantinople. Back in southern Europe by summer, they wintered in Rome. There were many American artists in Rome that year, and they joined several artist/friends, including Sanford Robinson Gifford, Jervis McEntee and other friends who were also living in Rome. While in Rome, Church learned fresco painting, and made a collection of "Old Masters" paintings. However, apparently Europe on the whole did not seem to interest Church as it did most American artists of the 19th century, many of whom traveled there to experience the Western artistic heritage. Leaving his expanded family in Rome with friends, Frederic made a two-week visit to stay in Athens ended the journey in April 1869. At Athens the Parthenon impressed him, and he sketched and painted it energetically. The Churches left Rome in May 1869, and made their way home via Paris and England, arriving home by the end of June.

Before departing the United States for that trip, Church purchased the 18 acres (7.3 ha) on the hilltop above his Hudson farmland, which he had long wanted for its magnificent views of the Hudson River and the Catskills. In 1870, he began the construction of a Persian-inspired mansion on the hilltop, and the family moved into the home in the summer of 1872. Today this estate is conserved as the Olana State Historic Site. Richard Morris Hunt was consulted early on in the plans for the mansion at Olana, but after the Churches' trip, the English-born American architect Calvert Vaux was hired to complete the project. Church was deeply involved in the process, even completing his own architectural sketches for its design. This highly personal and eclectic building incorporated many of the design ideas that he had acquired during his travels. In one letter of the period, he wrote "I have made about 1 3/4 miles of road this season, opening entirely new and beautiful views. I can make more and better landscapes in this way than by tampering with canvas and paint in the studio." He devoted much of his energy during his last twenty years to Olana.

Church had been enormously successful as an artist. In his last decades, illness limited Church's ability to paint. By 1876, Church was stricken with rheumatoid arthritis, making painting difficult. He eventually painted with his left hand and continued to produce works, although at a much slower pace. He still taught painting as Cole had before him. Two students were Walter Launt Palmer, son of his close friend Erastus Dow Palmer, and Howard Russell Butler. In later life he often wintered in Mexico, where he taught Butler.

Spending time at Olana and in Mexico, Church was less exposed to trends in New York City. He kept a studio there into the 1880s, but it was usually sublet to Martin Johnson Heade. His wife Isabel had been ill for years, and she died on May 12, 1899, at the home of their late friend and patron, William H. Osborn, on Park Avenue in New York. Less than a year later, on April 7, 1900, at the age of 73, Church also died at the home of Osborn's widow. Frederic and Isabel were buried in the family plot at Spring Grove Cemetery, Hartford, Connecticut.

== Legacy ==
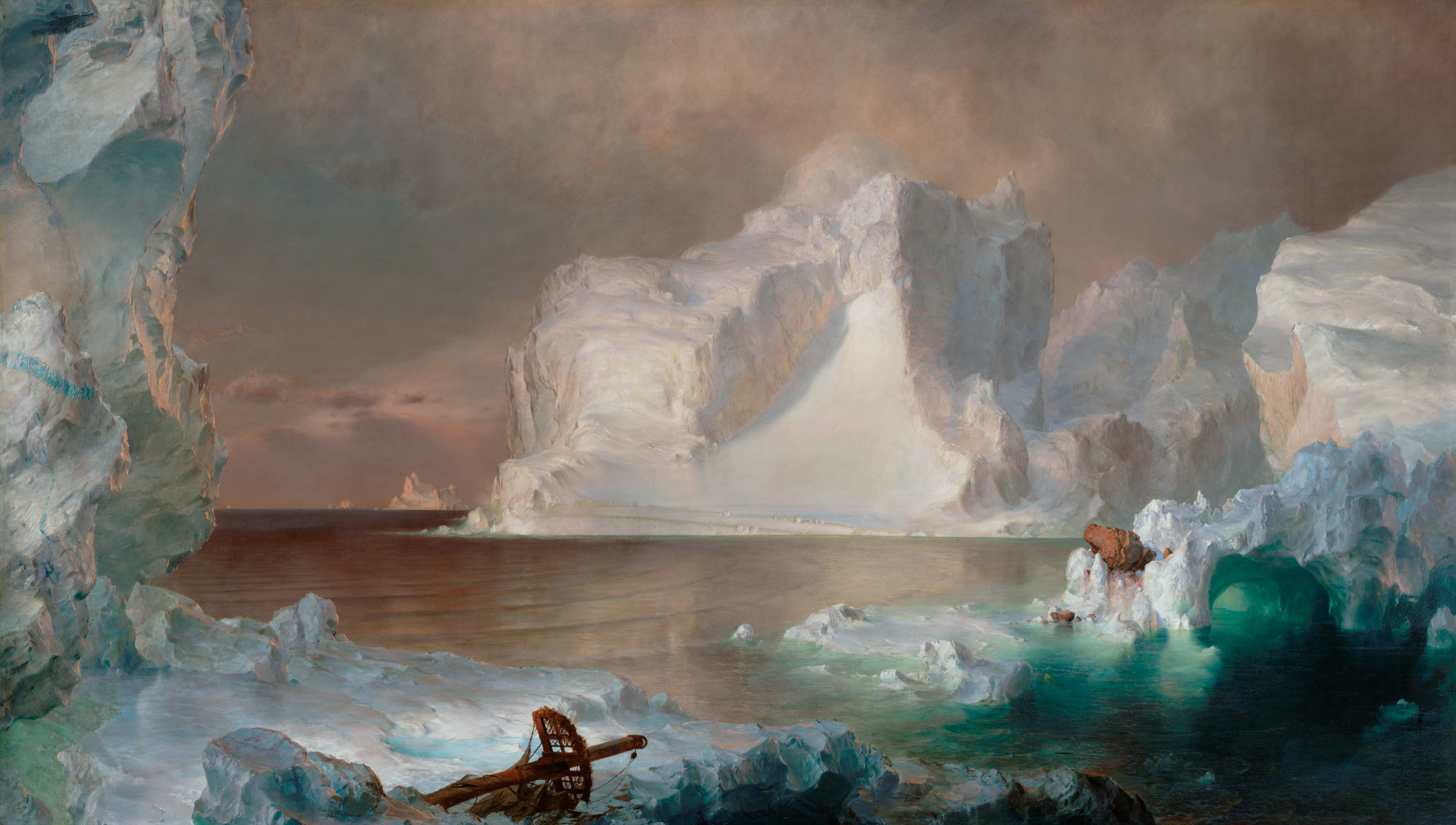
Church's The Icebergs (1861) was sold at auction for a record-setting amount in 1979, following its rediscovery.

In the last decades of his life Church's fame dwindled, and by his death in 1900 there was little interest in his work. His paintings were seen as part of an "old-fashioned and discredited" school that was too devoted to details. His reputation improved with a 1945 exhibition devoted to the Hudson River School at the Art Institute of Chicago, and that year the Metropolitan Museum of Art Bulletin revisited the original reception of The Heart of the Andes. In 1960 art historian David C. Huntington completed a dissertation on Church that explored his influences and milieu. By 1966 he had written a monograph on Church and organized the first exhibition devoted to Church since his death, for the National Collection of Fine Arts. Huntington recognized Church's estate as his greatest artwork and spearheaded the effort to preserve Olana when the property, which had been preserved largely as Church created it by later generations of the family, was threatened with destruction. He spearheaded a two-year campaign to save Frederic Church's Olana, resulting in a public-private partnership that created Olana State Historic Site.

Church's legacy was rekindled; American museums began to acquire his works, and by 1979 Church's The Icebergs sold for $2.5 million, then the third-highest auction for any work of art. The next year the National Gallery of Art held a major exhibition, American Light: The Luminist Movement, 1825–1875, which positioned Church as the leading American painter of his time.

Church's paintings, more confident and on a grander scale than those of his contemporaries, uniquely captured the spirit of an optimistic American people who associated the landscape of the New World with manifest destiny. Art historian Barbara Novak wrote that Church was "a paradigm of the artist who becomes the public voice of a culture, summarizing its beliefs, embodying its ideas, and confirming its assumptions."

Olana State Historic Site is now owned and operated by the New York State Office of Parks, Recreation and Historic Preservation, Taconic Region, and with its curatorial work, visitor services, and external relations managed by The Olana Partnership, a private, non-profit organization. In 1999, just before the centenary of Church's death, The Olana Partnership established the Frederic Church Award to honor individuals and organizations who make extraordinary contributions to American art and culture.

There are several museum exhibitions celebrating the 200th anniversary of Church's birth:

- Frederic Church: Global Artist, Olana State Historic Site, May 17 – October 25, 2026, catalog edited by Tim Barringer, Elizabeth Mankin Kornhauser, and Jennifer Raab (ISBN 978-0-300-28517-8)
- Guests of Honor: Frederic Church's Cotopaxi, Detroit Institute of Arts, March 27 – October 25
- Splitting the Horizon: Frederic Church Between Border and Bridge, Frances Lehman Loeb Art Center, Vassar College, Poughkeepsie, New York, February 21 – August 30
- Framing American Democracy: Radical Roots, The Wadsworth, Hartford, Connecticut, April 23 – September 27
- Niagara Falls: Mist and Majesty, National Gallery of Art, Washington, D.C., May 2 – September 20, 2026
- Frederic Church in Vermont, Middlebury College Museum of Art, Middlebury, Vermont, May 22 – August 9, 2026
- Your Friend, Frederic E. Church, Albany Institute of History & Art, June 6, 2026 – October 12, 2026 [focuses on Church's friendship with sculptor Erastus Dow Palmer].

Also in 2026, Glorious Country: How the Artist Frederic Church Brought the World to America and America to the World, the first biography of Church, was published by Victoria Johnson (ISBN 978-1-982-19629-5).

== Gallery ==
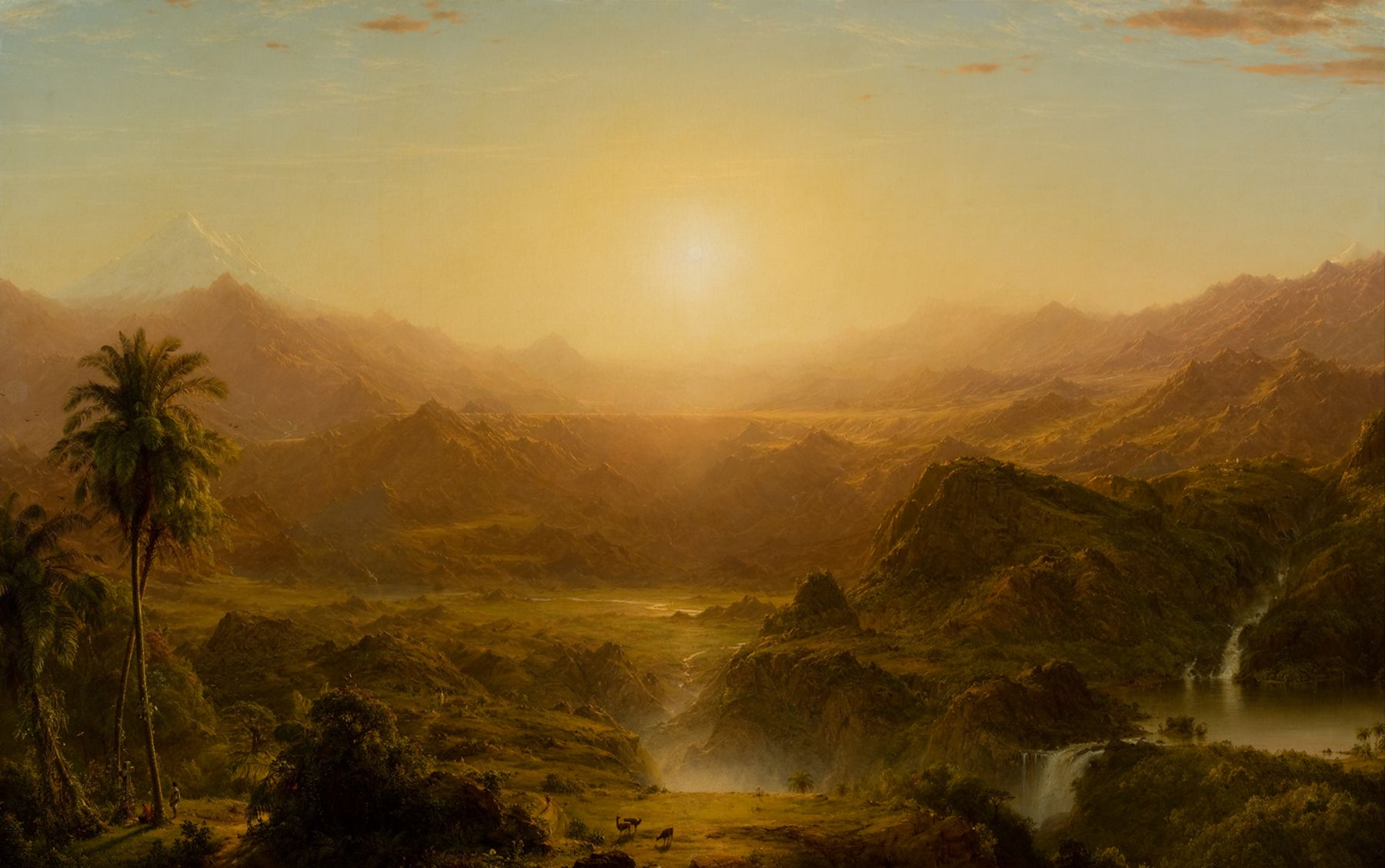
The Andes of Ecuador, 1855, Reynolda House Museum of American Art

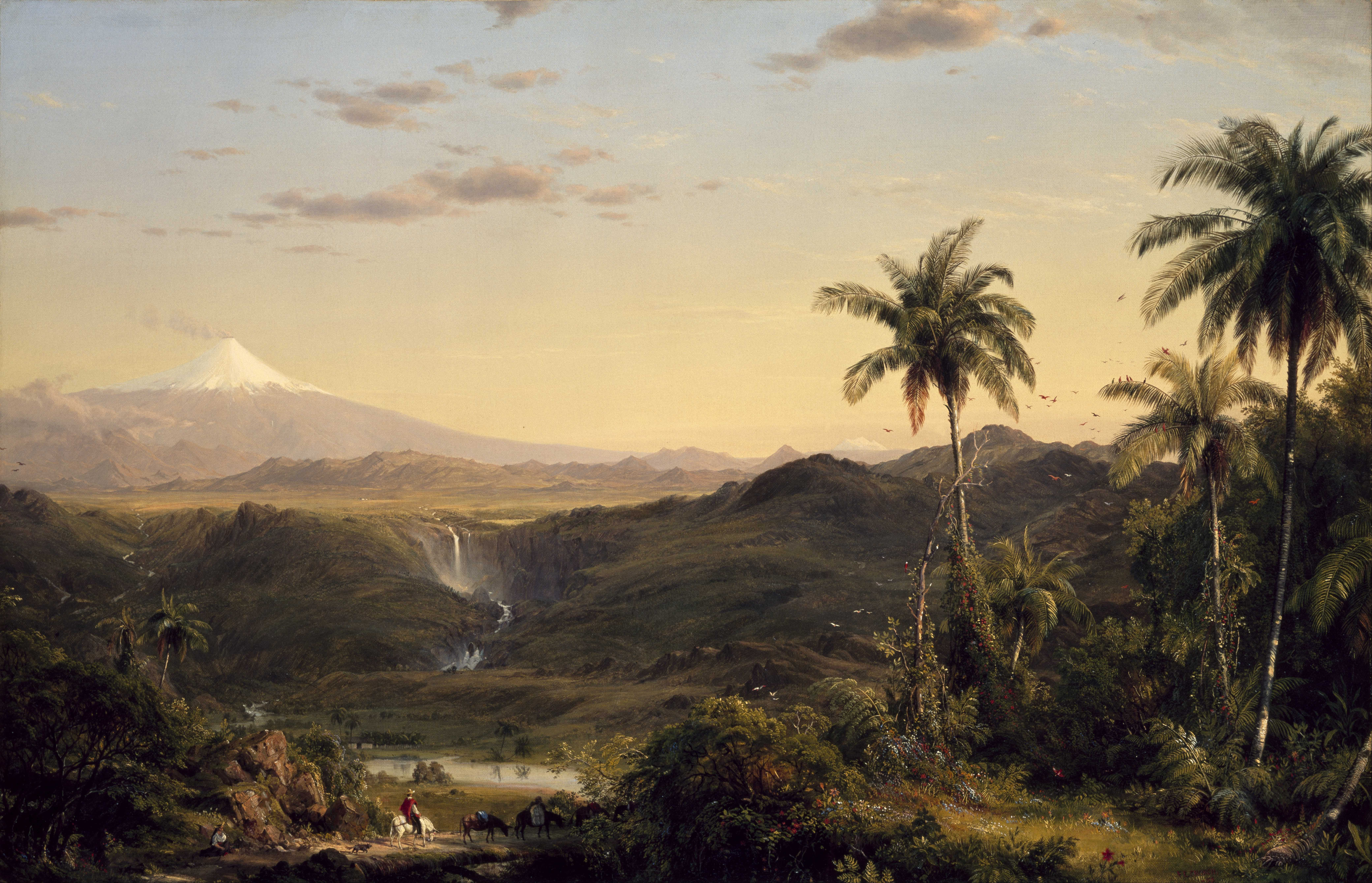
Cotopaxi, 1855

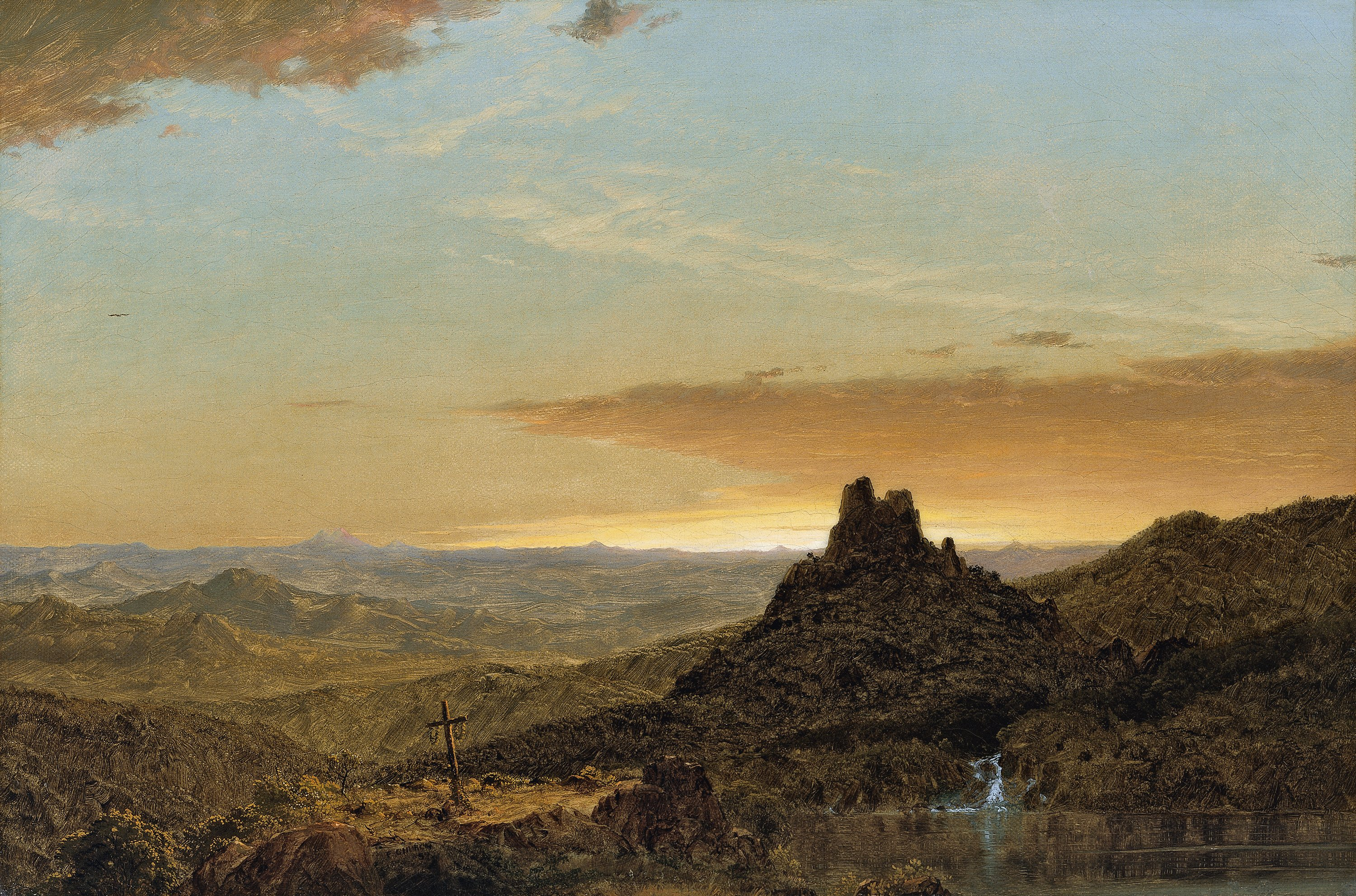
Cross in the Wilderness, 1857

Niagara, 1857, National Gallery of Art, Washington, DC.

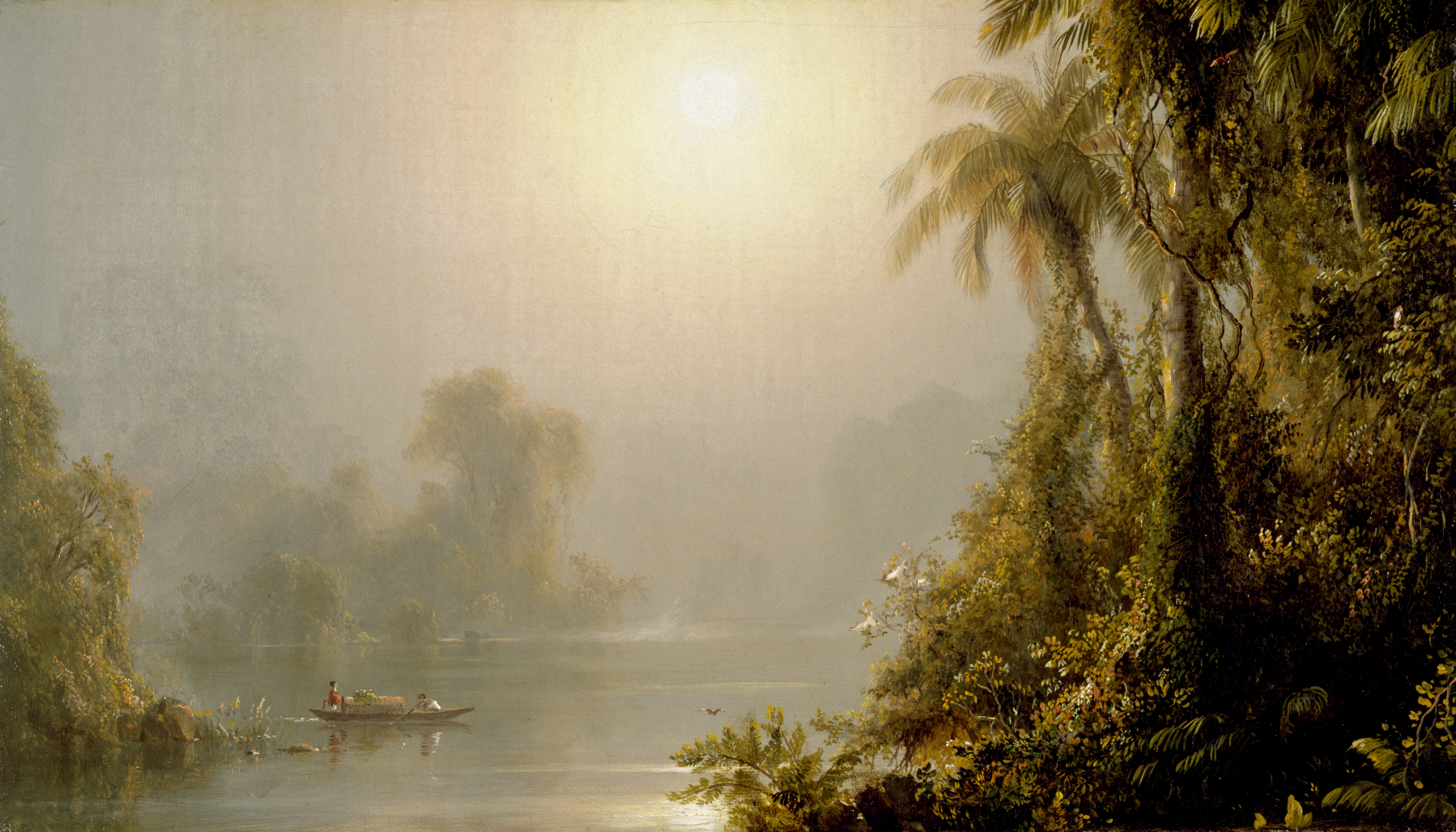
Morning in the Tropics, ca. 1858, The Walters Art Museum, Baltimore

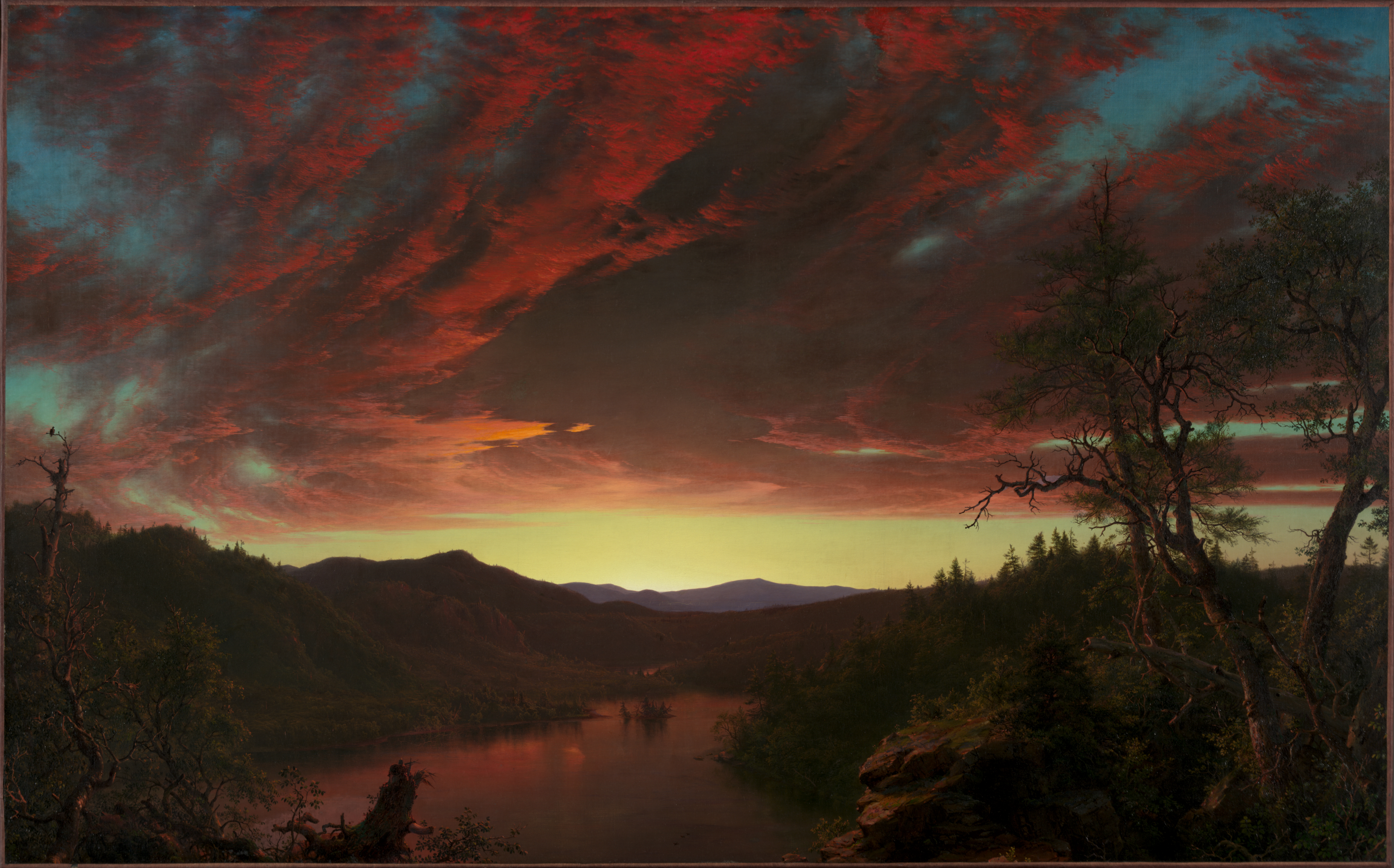
Twilight in the Wilderness, 1860, Cleveland Museum of Art

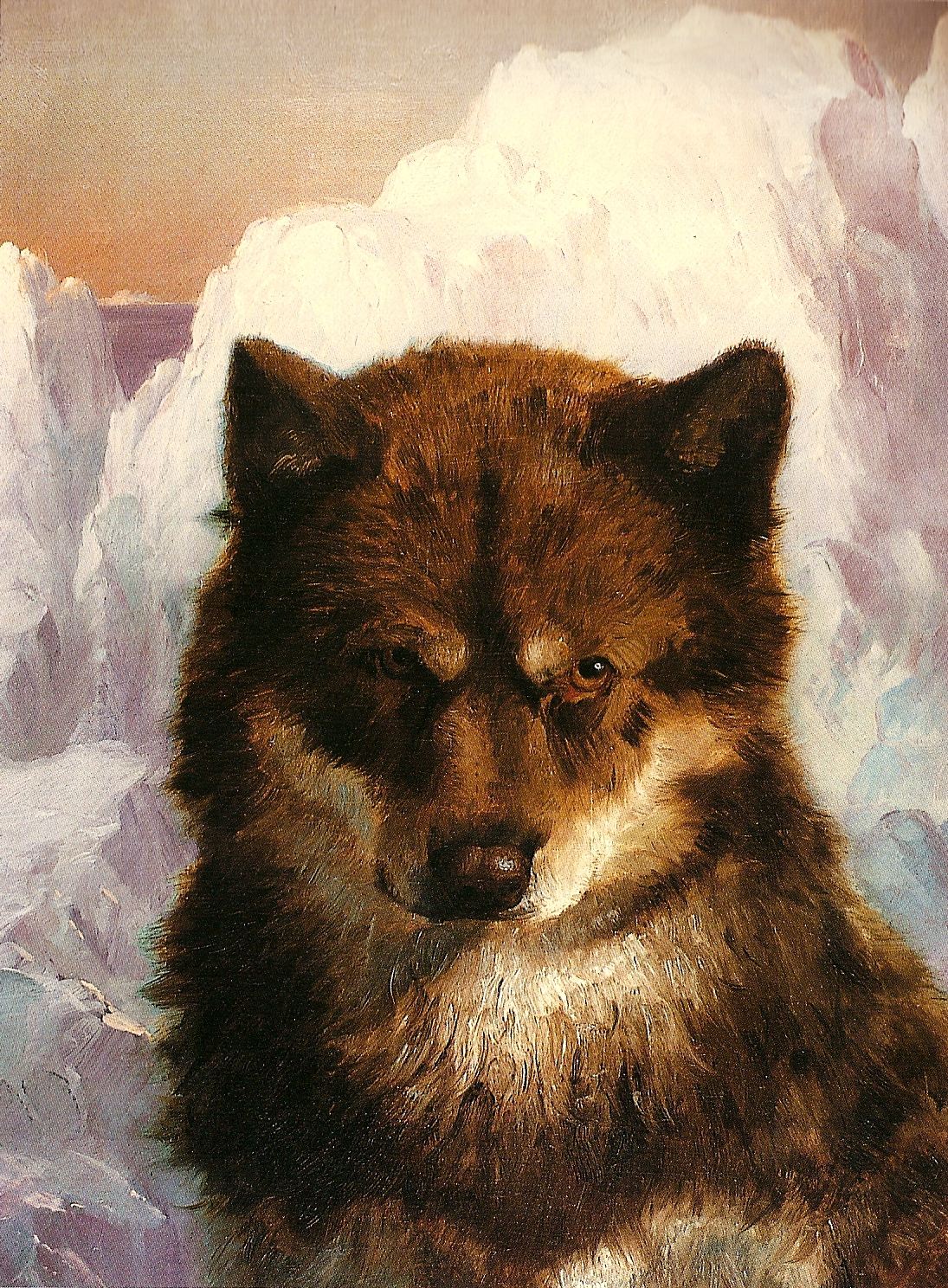
Oosisoak, 1861

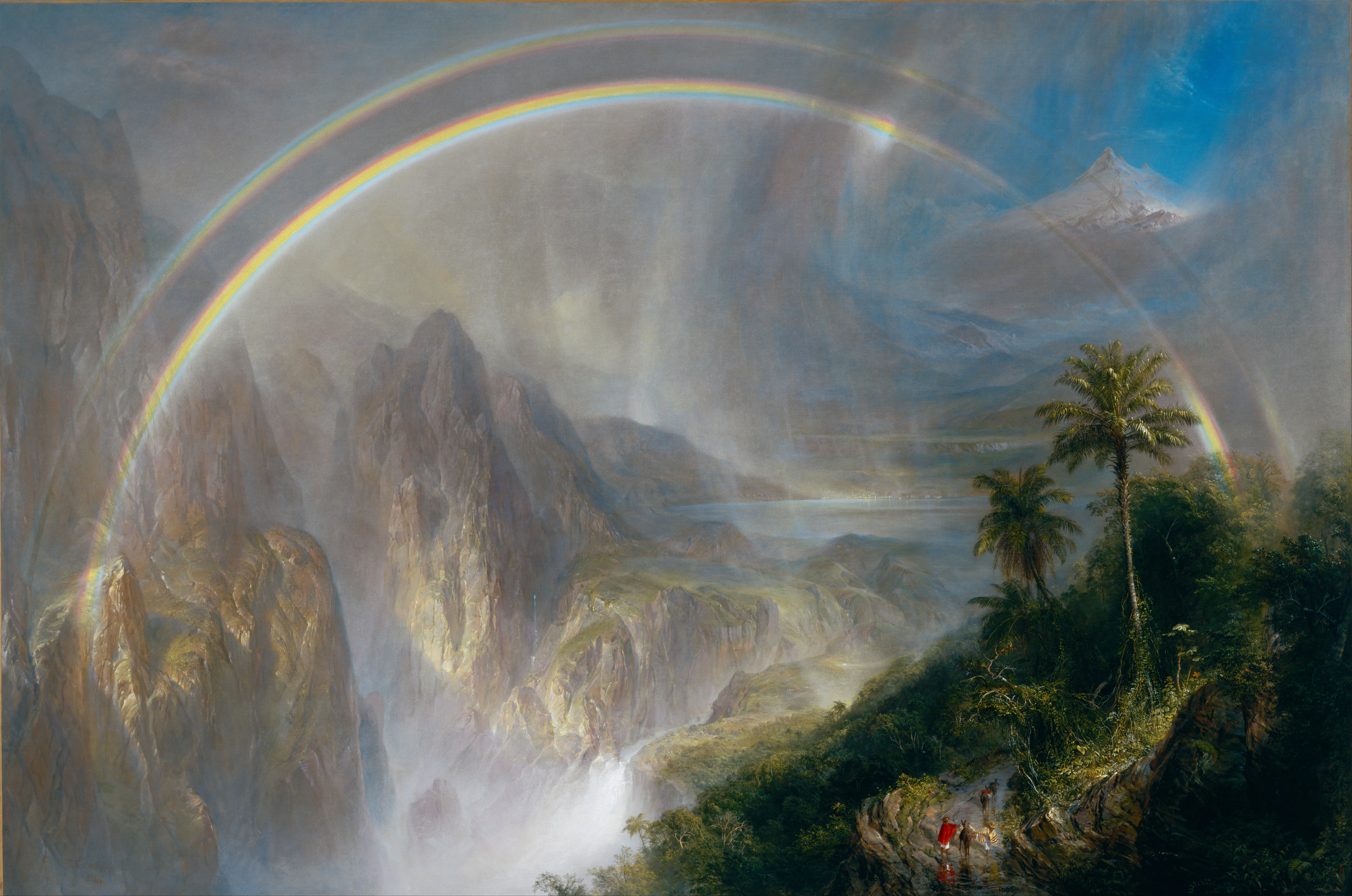
Rainy Season in the Tropics, 1866, Fine Arts Museums of San Francisco

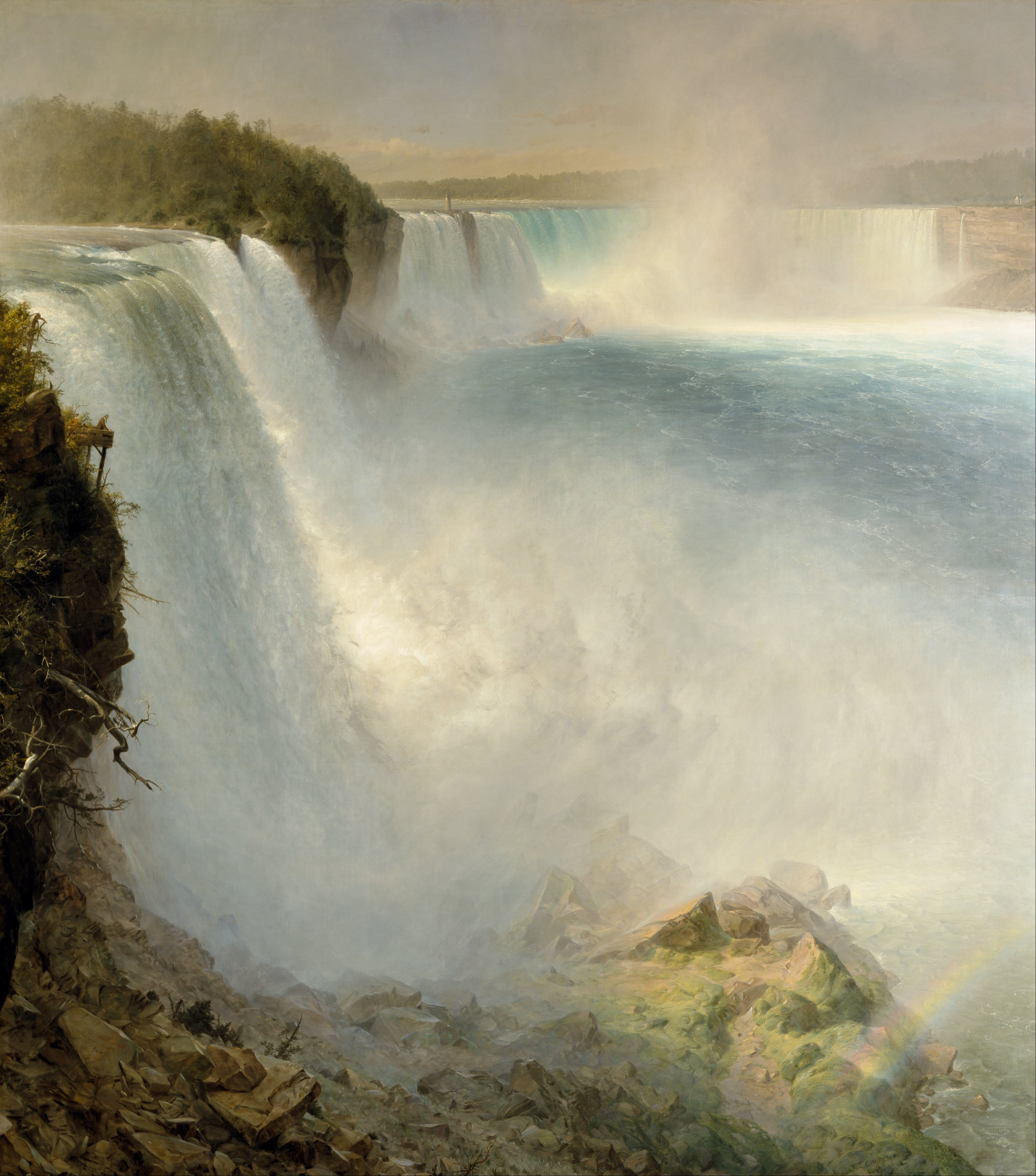
Niagara Falls, from the American Side, 1867

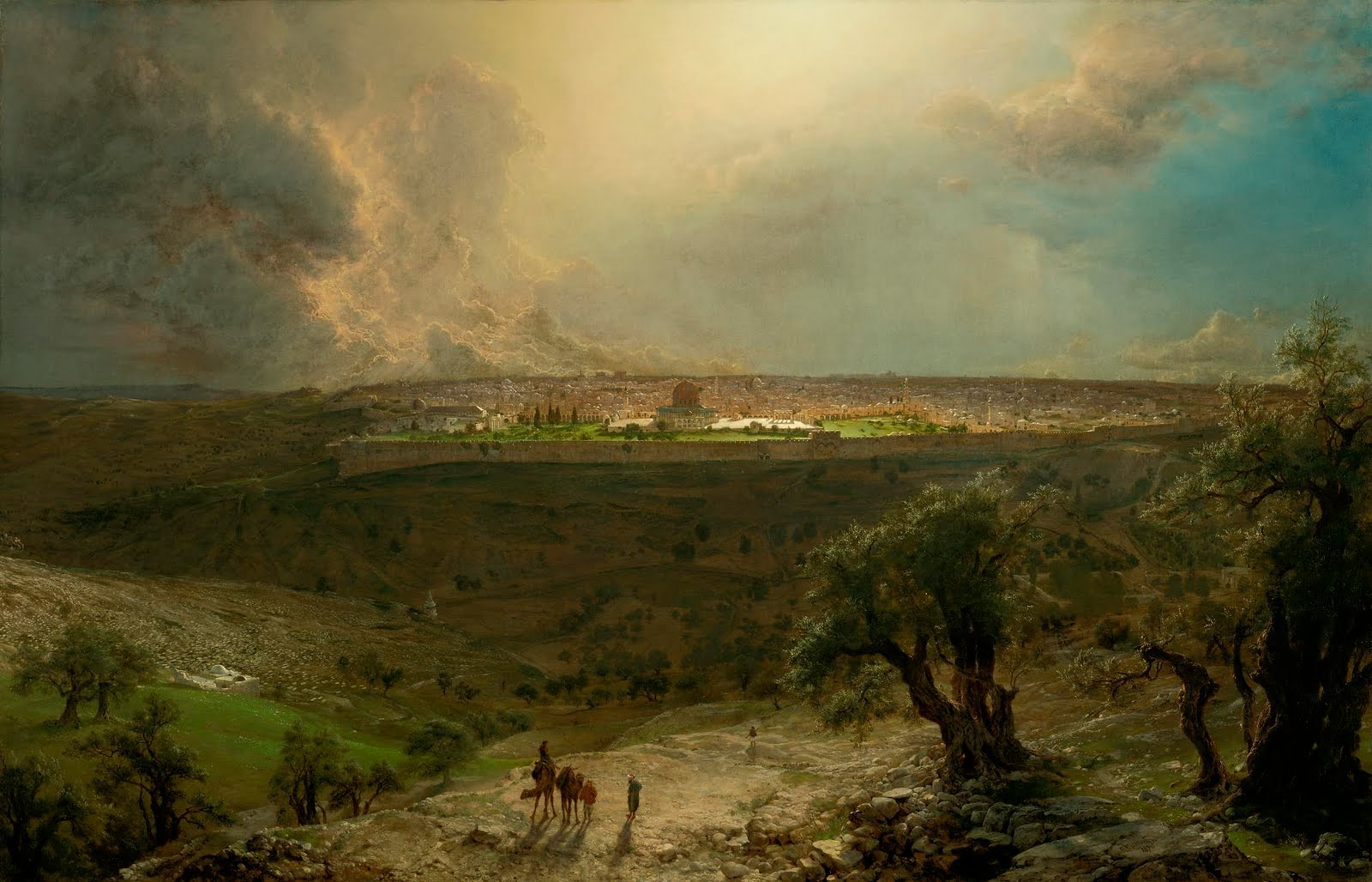
Jerusalem from the Mount of Olives, 1870, The Nelson-Atkins Museum of Art

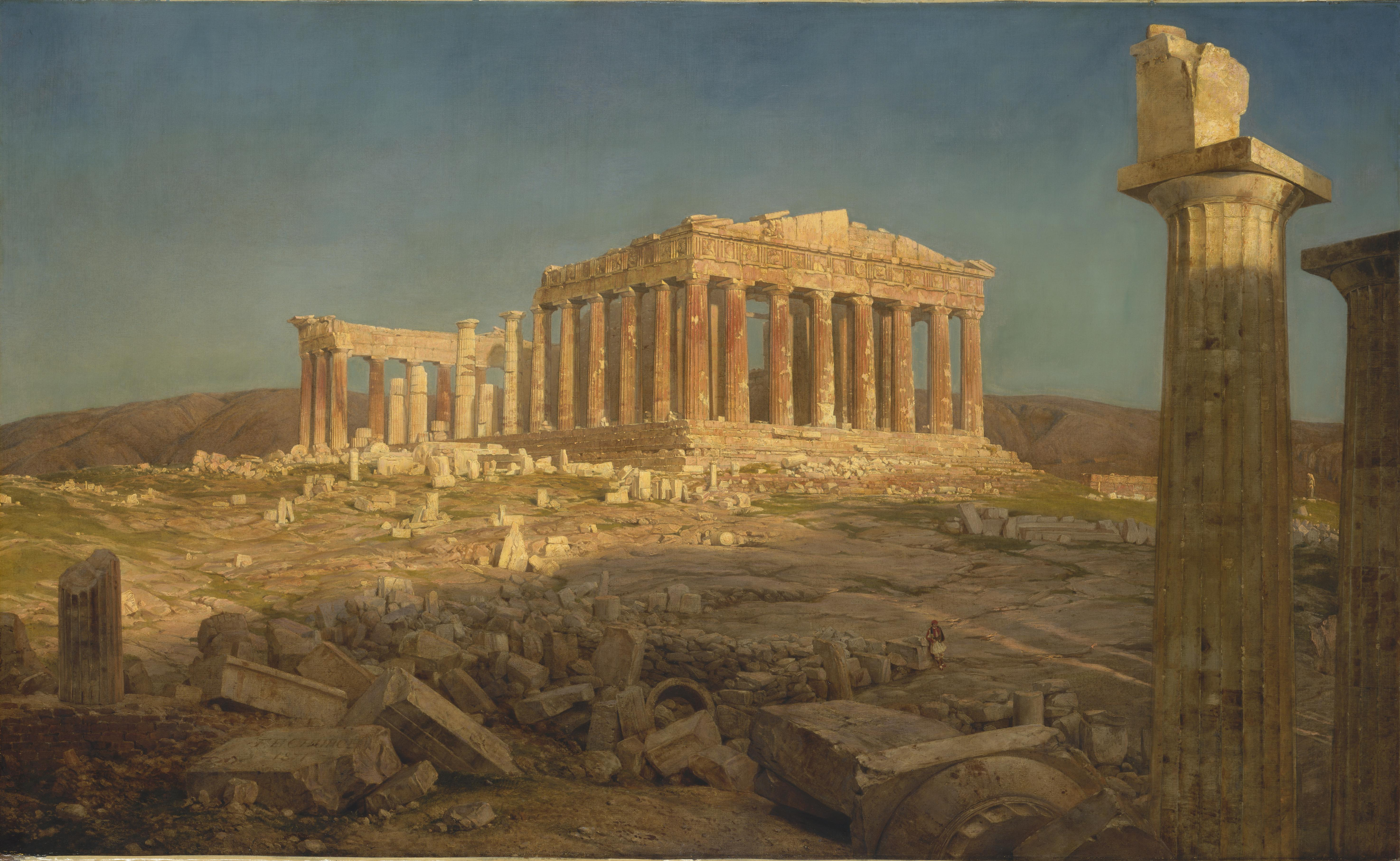
The Parthenon, 1871, The Metropolitan Museum of Art

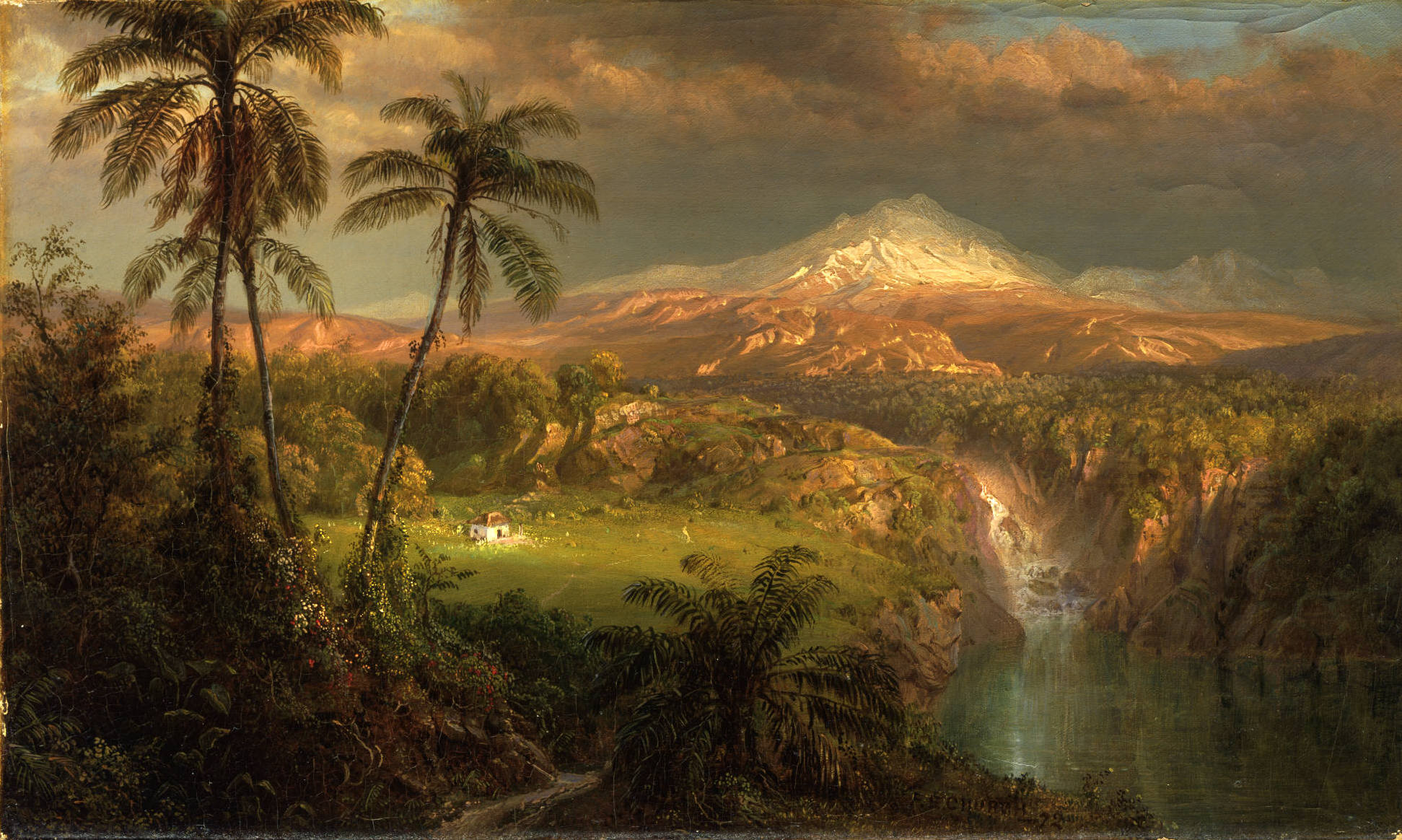
Passing Shower in the Tropics, 1872, Princeton University Art Museum

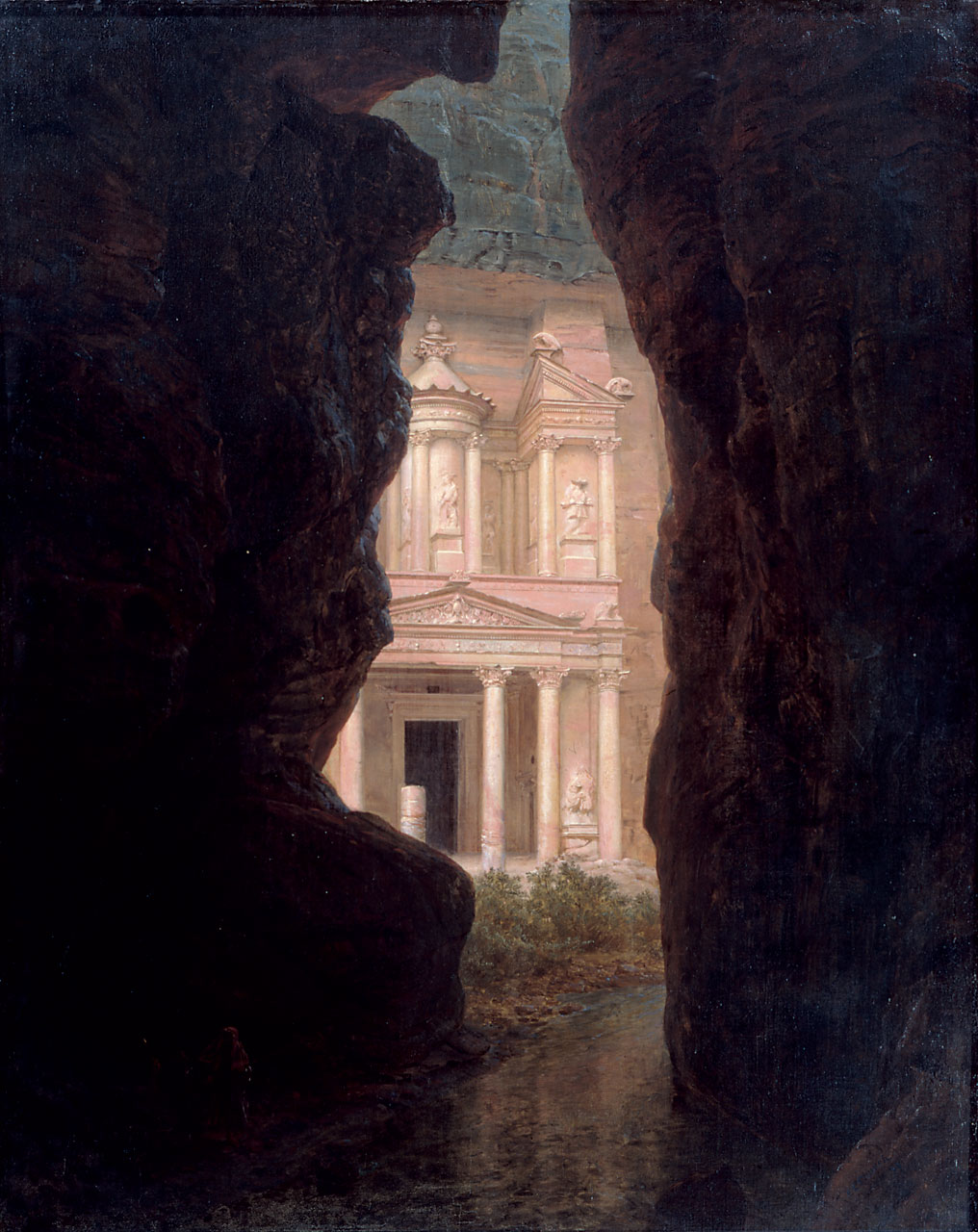
El Khasné, Petra, 1874, Olana State Historic Site

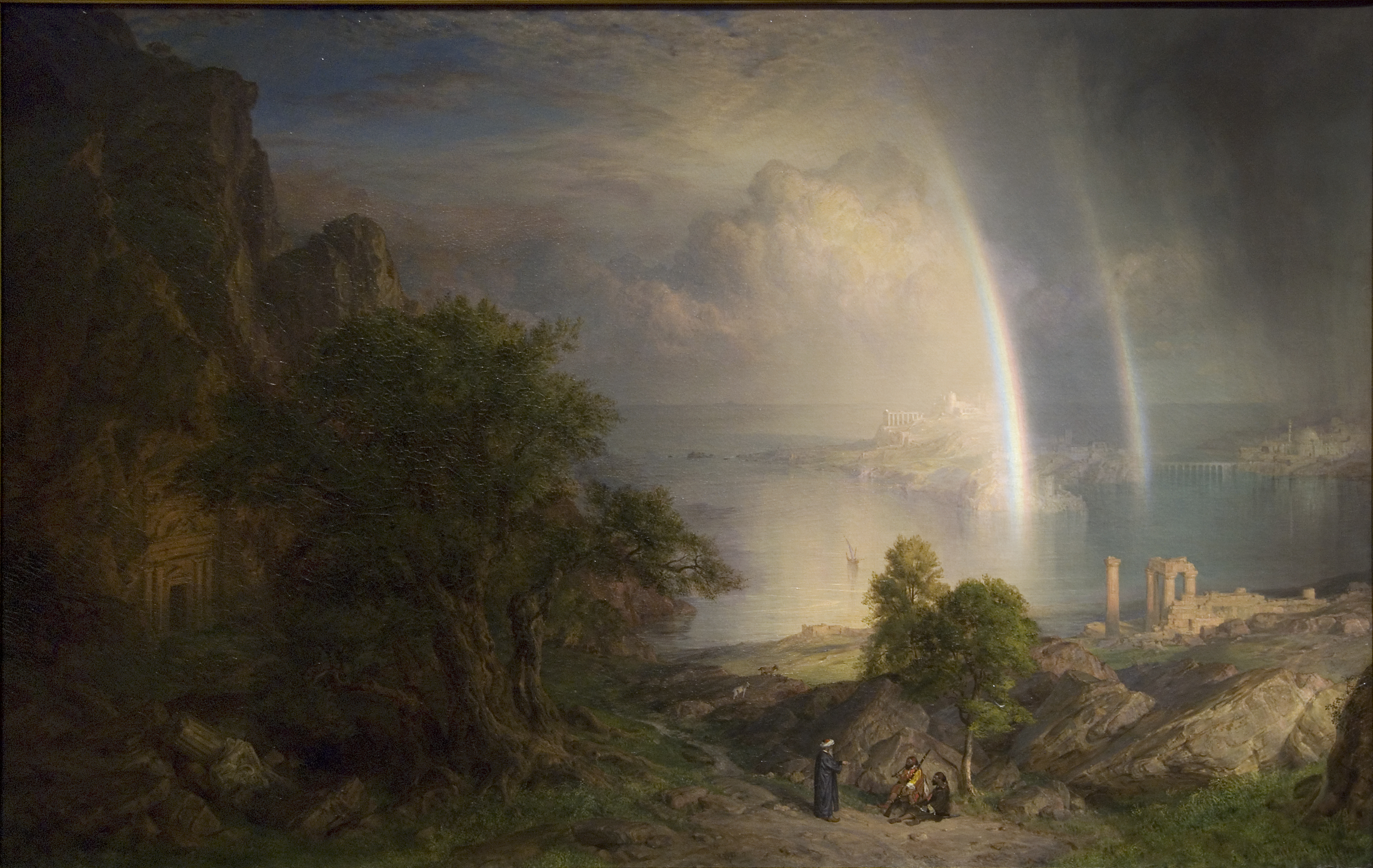
The Aegean Sea, c. 1877, Metropolitan Museum of Art

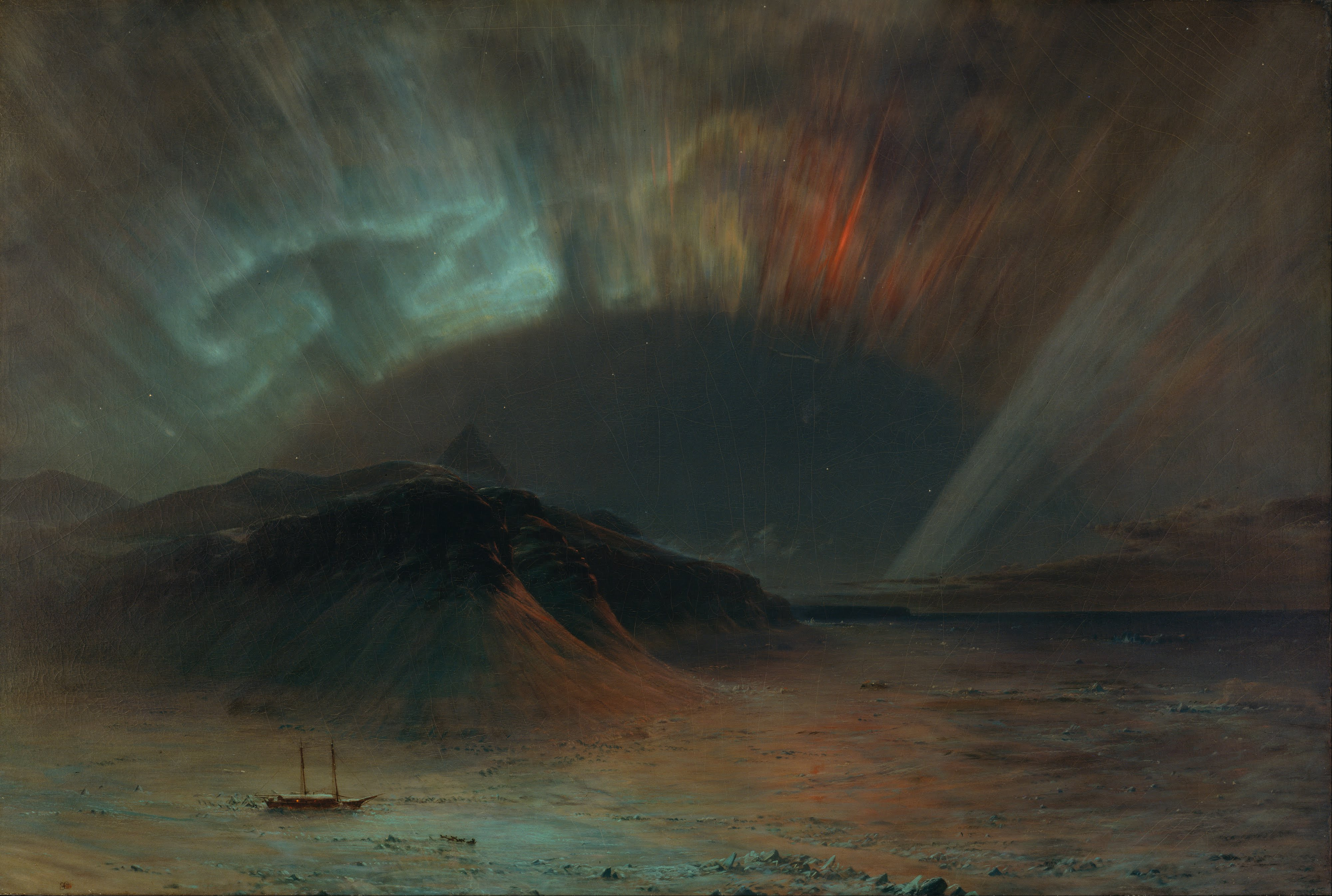
Aurora Borealis, 1865, Smithsonian American Art Museum

== Sources ==
- Avery, Kevin J. (1993). Church's Great Picture: The Heart of the Andes. Metropolitan Museum of Art. ISBN 9780300193091. OCLC 1558012246. Internet Archive copy (registration required).
- Carr, Gerald L. (1994). Frederic Edwin Church: Catalogue Raisonné of Works of Art at Olana State Historic Site (Hardcover ed.). Cambridge: Cambridge University Press. ISBN 9780521385404. OCLC 25050391.
- Harvey, Eleanor Jones; Church, Frederic Edwin (2002). The Voyage of the Icebergs: Frederic Church's Arctic Masterpiece. Dallas Museum of Art. ISBN 9780300095364.
- Howat, John K.; Church, Frederic Edwin (2005). Frederic Church. Yale University Press. ISBN 978-0300109887.
- Huntington, David C. (1966). The Landscapes of Frederic Edwin Church: Vision of an American Era. New York: George Braziller. LCCN 66-16675. OCLC 518295.
- Kelly, Franklin (1985). Frederic Edwin Church and the North American Landscape, 1845–1860 (Ph.D.). University of Delaware. ProQuest 303390102.
- Kelly, Franklin (1988). Frederic Edwin Church and the National Landscape. Smithsonian Institution Press. ISBN 978-0-87474-592-4.
- Kelly, Franklin (1989). Frederic Edwin Church. Washington, D.C.: National Gallery of Art. ISBN 978-0874744583. OCLC 1413388877.
- Wilmerding, John (1980). American Light: The Luminist Movement, 1850–1875. Washington, D.C.: National Gallery of Art. ISBN 9780691002804.
