= El Khasné, Petra (painting) =

Painting by Frederic Edwin Church

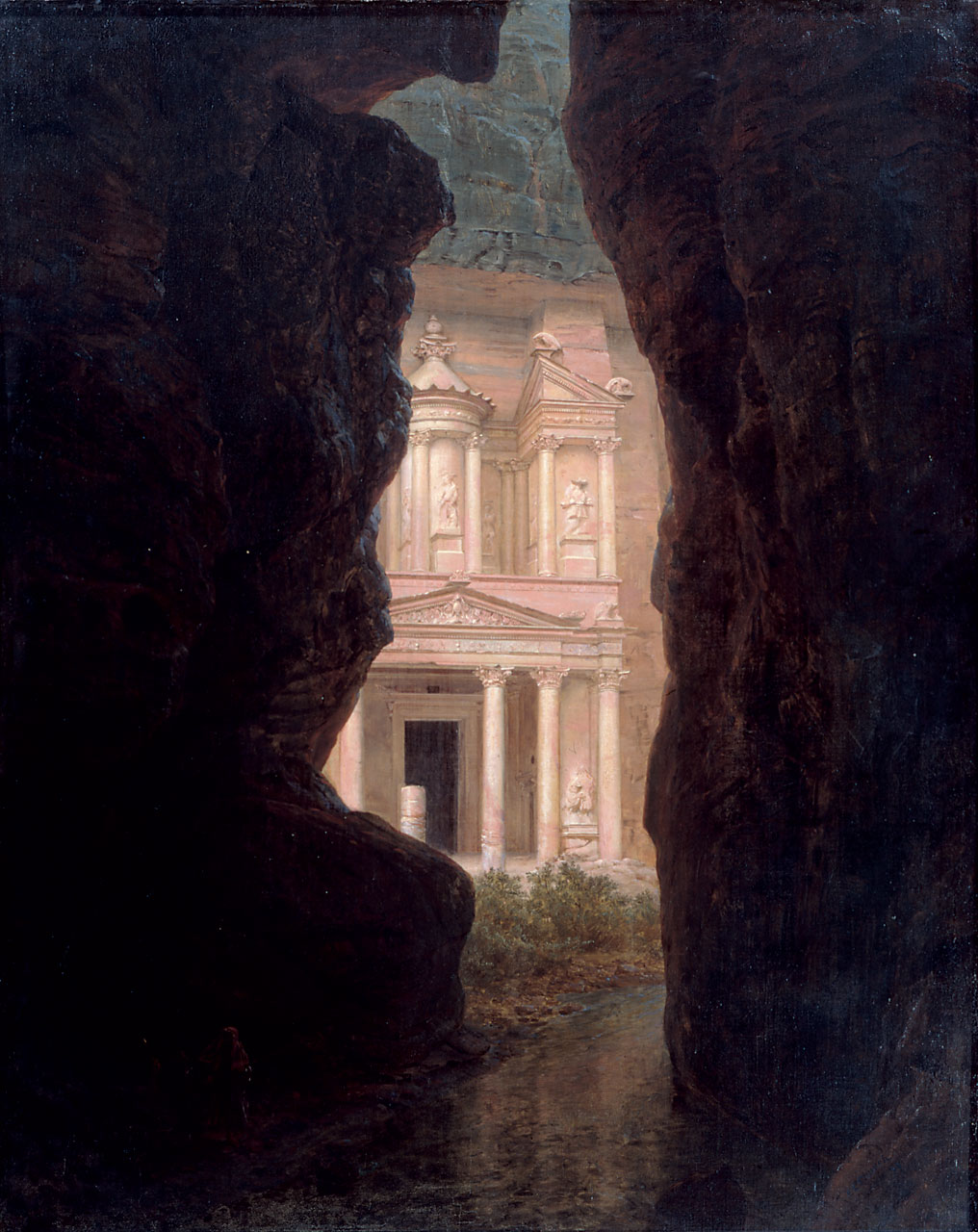
- Artist: Frederic Edwin Church
- Year: 1874
- Medium: Oil on canvas
- Dimensions: 153.7 cm × 127.6 cm (60.5 in × 50.2 in)
- Location: Olana State Historic Site, New York, US

El Khasné, Petra is an 1874 oil painting by American landscape artist Frederic Edwin Church. It is a depiction of the Al-Khazneh tomb in the historical city of Petra, Jordan, which Church visited during an extended trip to the Middle East and Europe in 1867 and 1868. He visited the tomb with American missionary D. Stuart Dodge in February 1868 and made sketches there. The painting is located at Olana State Historic Site, the preserved homestead where Church lived in his later years. It may be the last canvas that he painted entirely with his right hand, owing to worsening rheumatoid arthritis.

The mausoleum is carved out of sandstone and at the time was only approachable by the depicted passageway, called the Siq. Church composed the painting as he would have first glimpsed the temple; he frames it with the dark rock in a manner that is unconventional for its time. Church found the site "astonishing" and wrote in his diary of a "beautiful temple ... shining as if by its own internal light", which he described as a salmon color. The composition is unlike those of the paintings that had made Church famous; there is no panoramic view, no conveyance of a "greater whole", and little sense of depth. The narrow passage has a stream running through it, and the two Bedouin figures at left, barely discernible, provide a sense of scale.

Church set out for Petra from Jerusalem with a large entourage of 21 men who provided meals and protection, and got on well with them. The area was popular with artists but considered dangerous; Church reported that an artist had been shot before him. Taking sketches of sacred locales was not necessarily seen as an innocent activity. As Church wrote:

We went straight to the famous Khasné, first as being the best of all the temples at Petra—I saw it, was astonished and then deliberately opened my three legged stool, sat upon it, opened my sketchbook, spread out the paper, sharpened the pencil, took a square look at the Temple and an askant one at the Bedawins and made my first line—they made no motion and after a few rapid touches, I felt that the mystery was solved in my favor—I could sketch without let or hindrance, a freedom unaccorded before.

The painting was a gift to Church's wife. He designed it, along with its frame, for the sitting room in which it still hangs at the Olana site. Its salmon color is reflected in the interior decoration. It was shown at the National Academy in 1874.

== Gallery ==
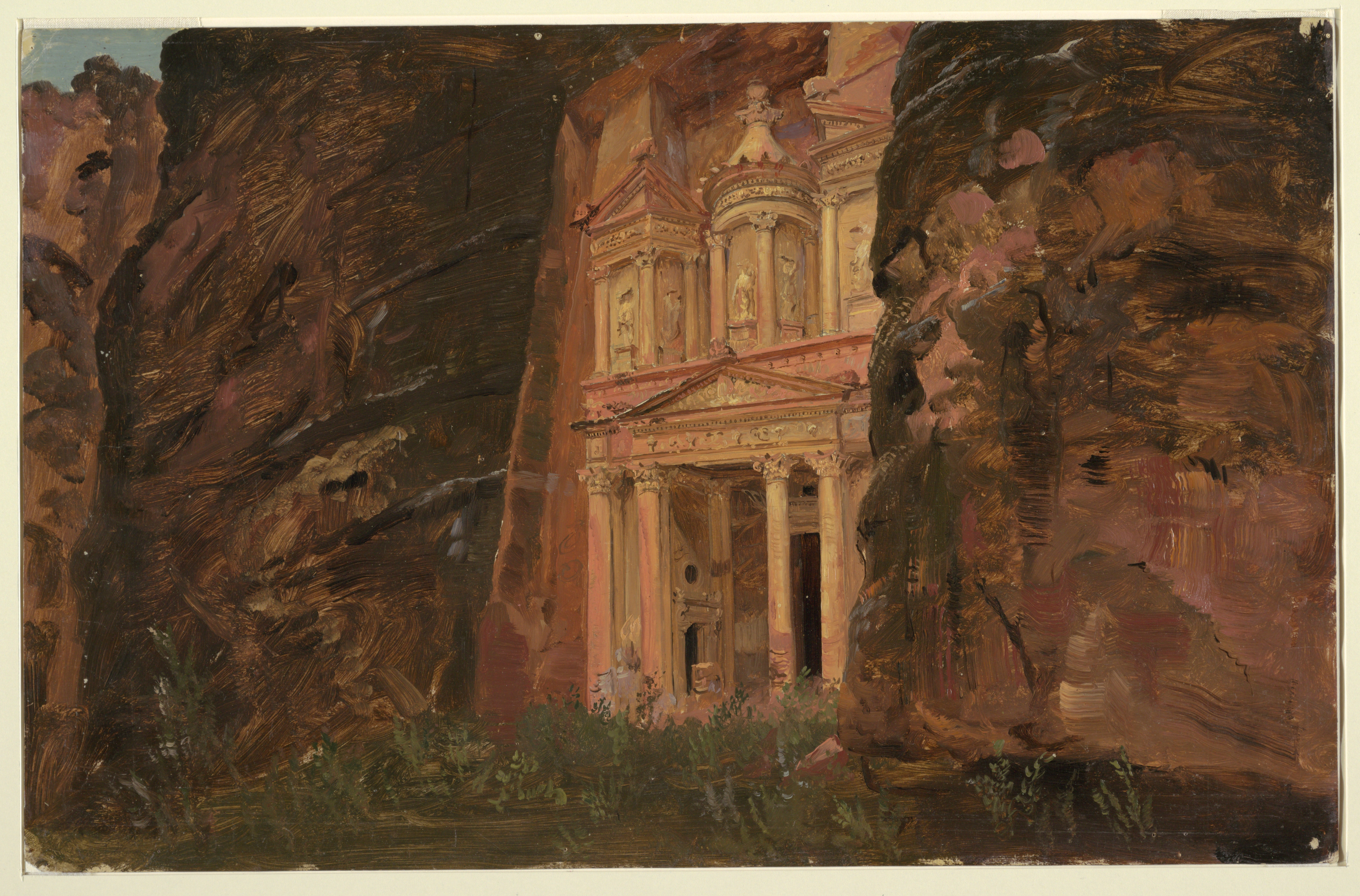
Oil study, 1868

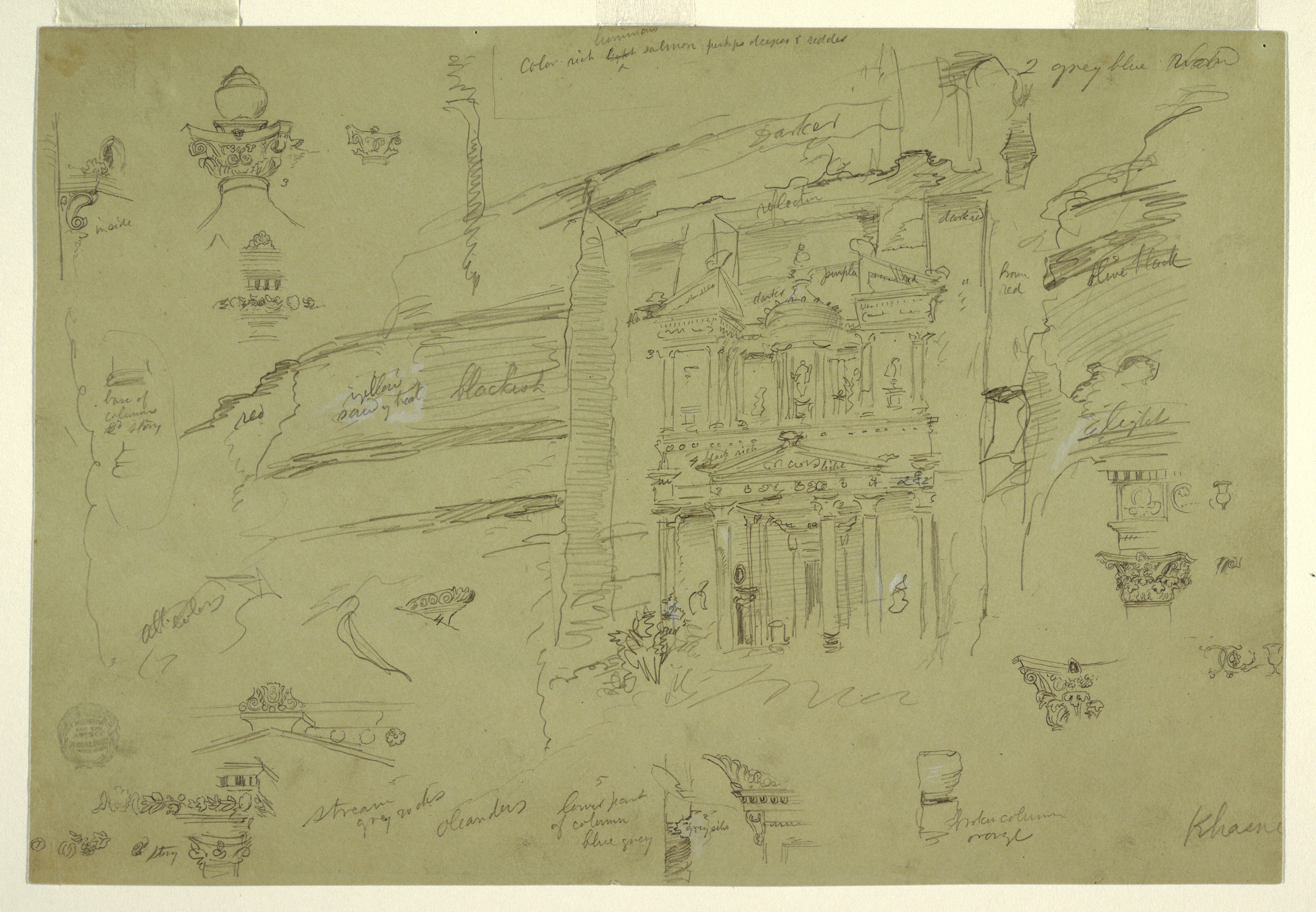
Sketch of architectural details, 1868

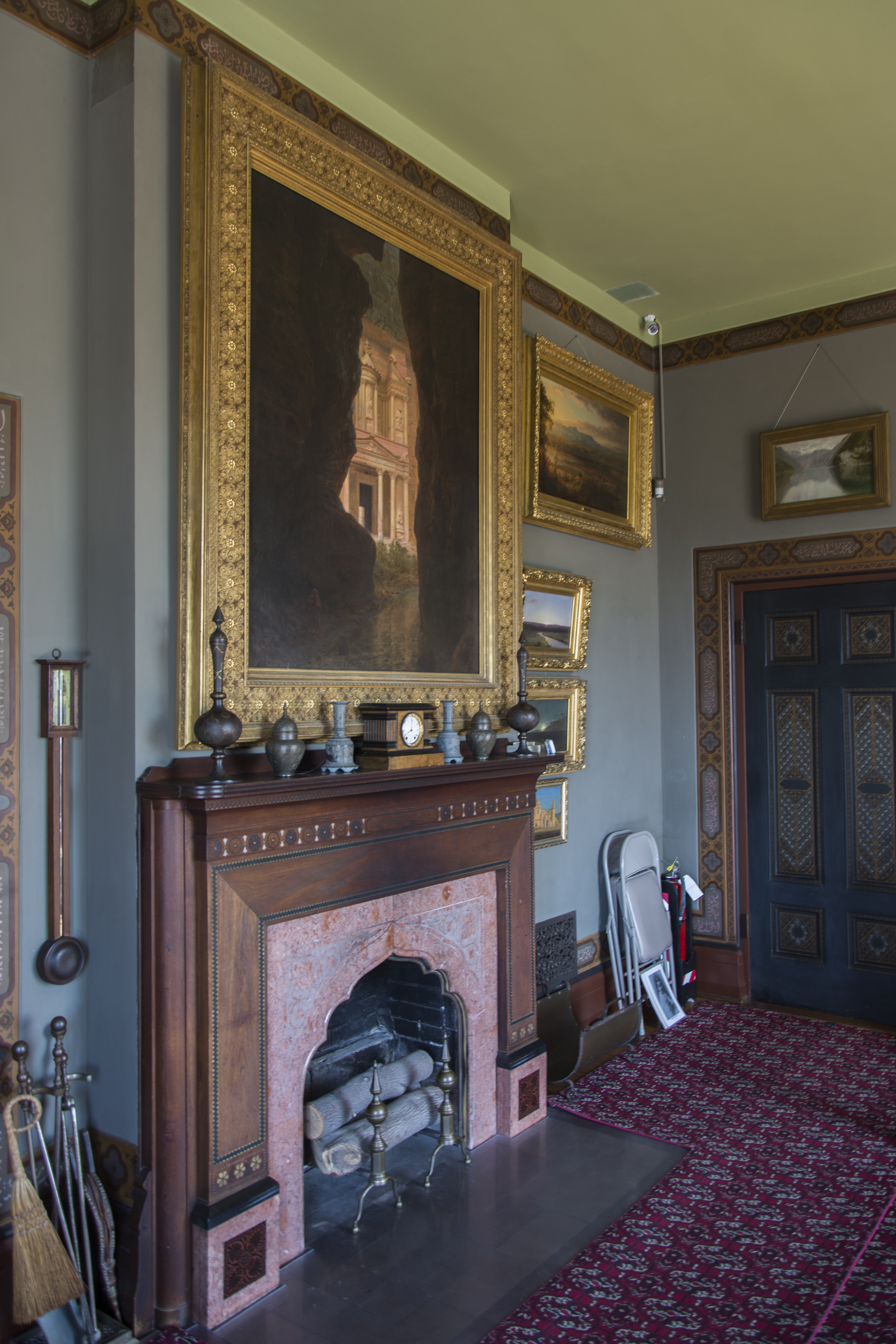
The painting in situ in Church's Olana home, now a historic site

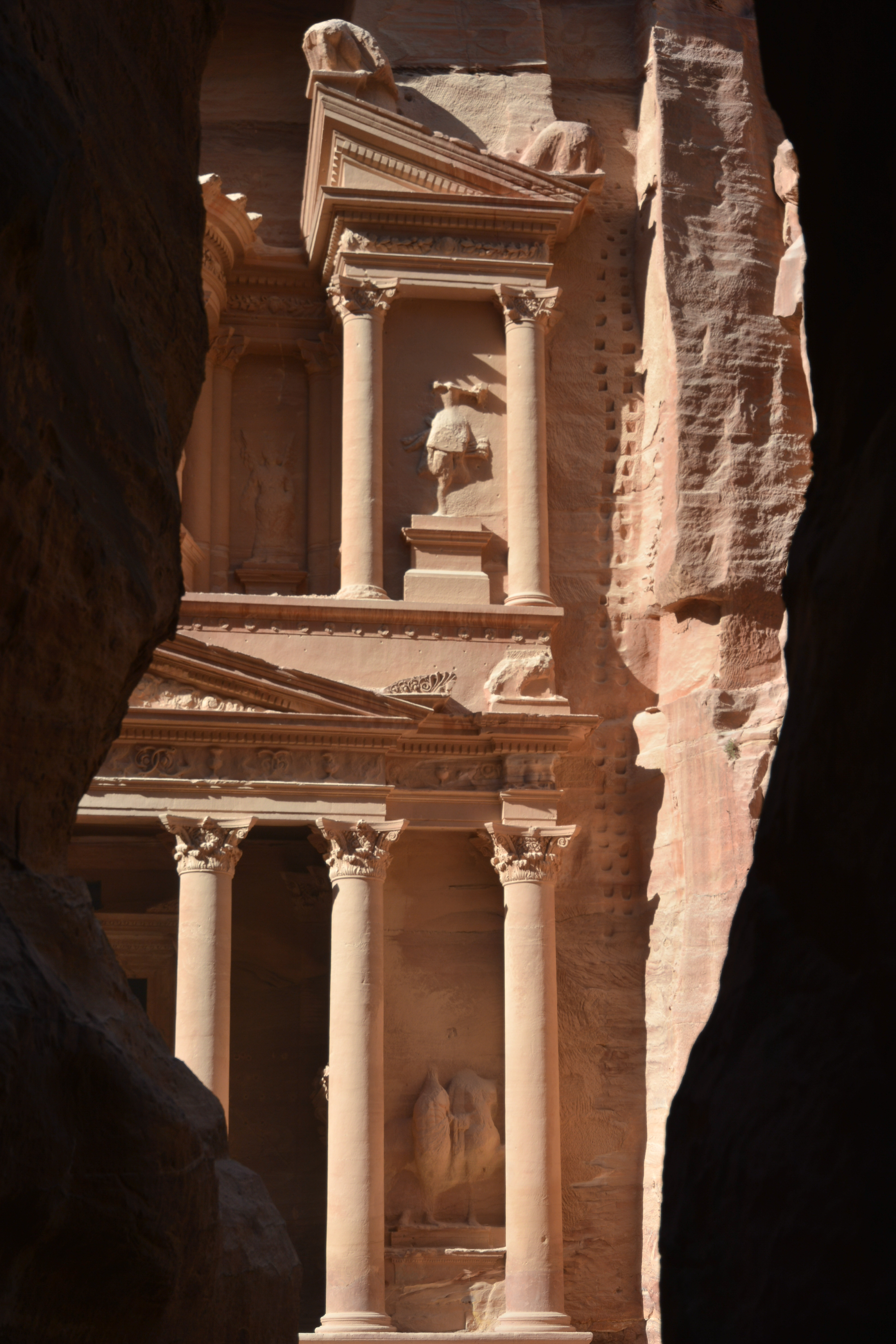
A photograph of the view in the painting

== See also ==
- List of paintings by Frederic Edwin Church
