= Twilight in the Wilderness =

1860 painting by Frederic Edwin Church

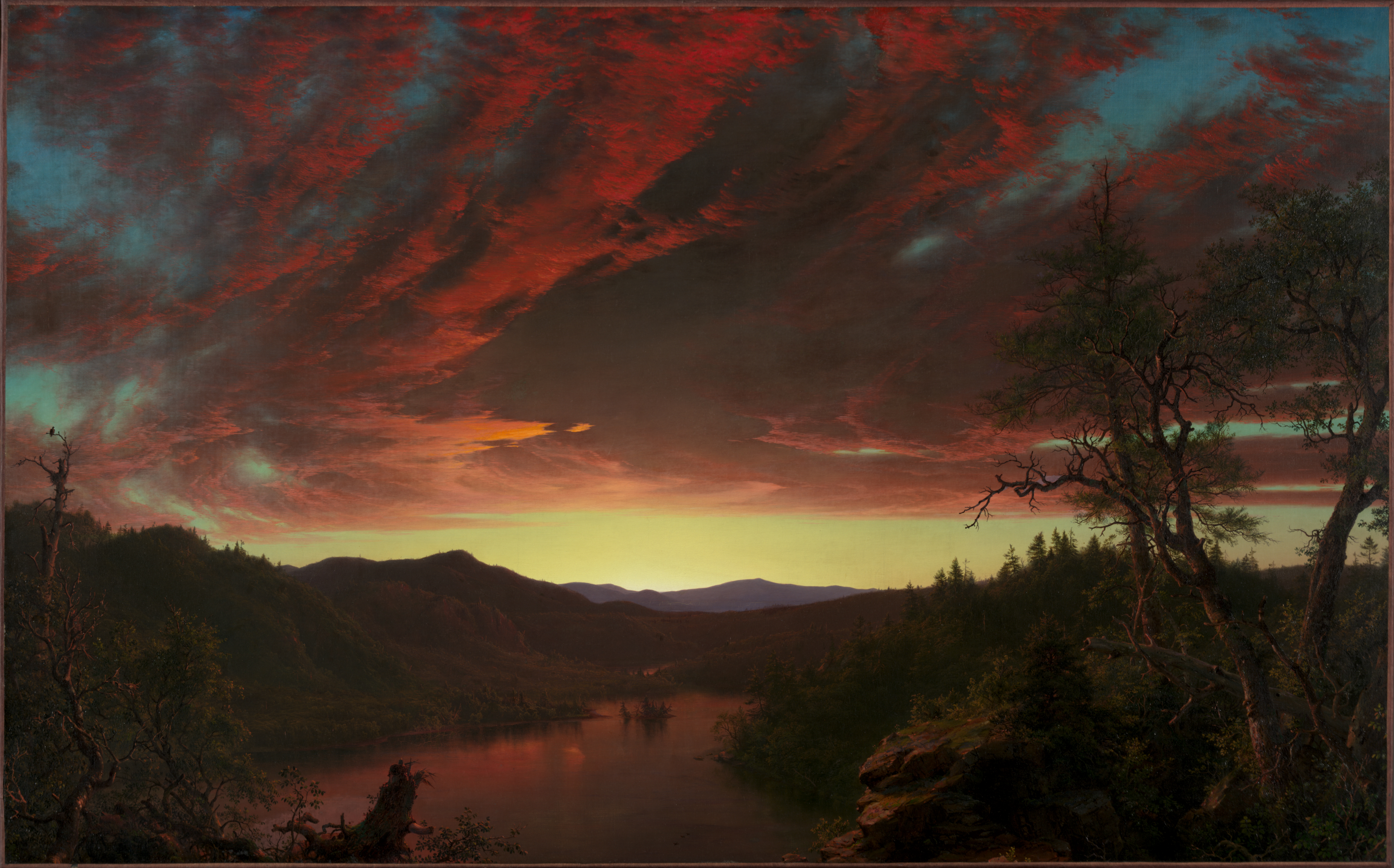
- Artist: Frederic Edwin Church
- Year: 1860
- Medium: Oil on canvas
- Dimensions: 101.6 cm × 162.6 cm (40.0 in × 64.0 in)
- Location: Cleveland Museum of Art, Cleveland, Ohio, US
- Website: Cleveland Museum of Art

Twilight in the Wilderness is an 1860 oil painting by American painter Frederic Edwin Church. The woodlands of the northeastern United States are shown against a setting sun that intensely colors the dramatic altocumulus clouds. Church scholar John K. Howat describes the painting as "one of his finest ever" and as "the single most impressive example of Church's depictions of unsullied North American woodlands and their most famous representation in nineteenth-century painting".

== Composition ==
Painted during a time of increasing American interest in unspoiled nature—Thoreau's Walden was published in 1854—there are no signs of human activity in this landscape; the only animal life is a small bird perched at left. Like many of Church's paintings, the picture is likely a composite of sketches taken in the field, especially in Maine, which he visited often. He travelled many times in the 1850s to Mount Desert Island and Mount Katahdin, then an especially remote area.

Like Church's other major works, it is a highly detailed view of nature. The sky is painted in skillful gradations of purples, oranges, and yellows, and reflects the influence of the popular English landscapist J. M. W. Turner on Church. Improved oil colors may have helped Church achieve the effect.

In terms of the Luminist style, with which Church is sometimes associated, the artistic achievement in the painted sky is the culmination of his many earlier pictures of sunsets and sunrises. David C. Huntington, Church's "re-discoverer" in the 1960s, writes that "there is no [longer a] surfeit of pigment; no unnatural border inadvertently solidifies the cloud vapors ... In Twilight in the Wilderness the discipline of careful study achieved its consummation." The lack of imposing "paintiness" contributes to the effect of a camera-like clarity that leaves the personality of the painter scarcely discernible, as one contemporary reviewer noted:

He has attained the distinction—that rarest distinction—of being a painter without a manner, almost without a style. His pictures are not tinged with his own personality. He paints, not nature according to Mr. Church, but simply nature. His eye, like every other man's, is a camera with a brain behind it; but his brain gives him the power to transfer to canvas the vanishing forms and tints and shadows thrown upon his eye, unaffected by the medium through which they have passed, except by selection, combination, and unification.

Whether this approach to painting, an aspect of Luminism, was commendable depends on the critic. The quoted review ends, "It is this absence of any signs of mood or manner in his works that we attribute the charm of a deficiency in feeling which is sometimes brought against him." Huntington responds, "The dissemblance of art has so enthralled the critic that the mood, the feeling of Twilight in the Wilderness elude his recognition."

== Reception and interpretation ==
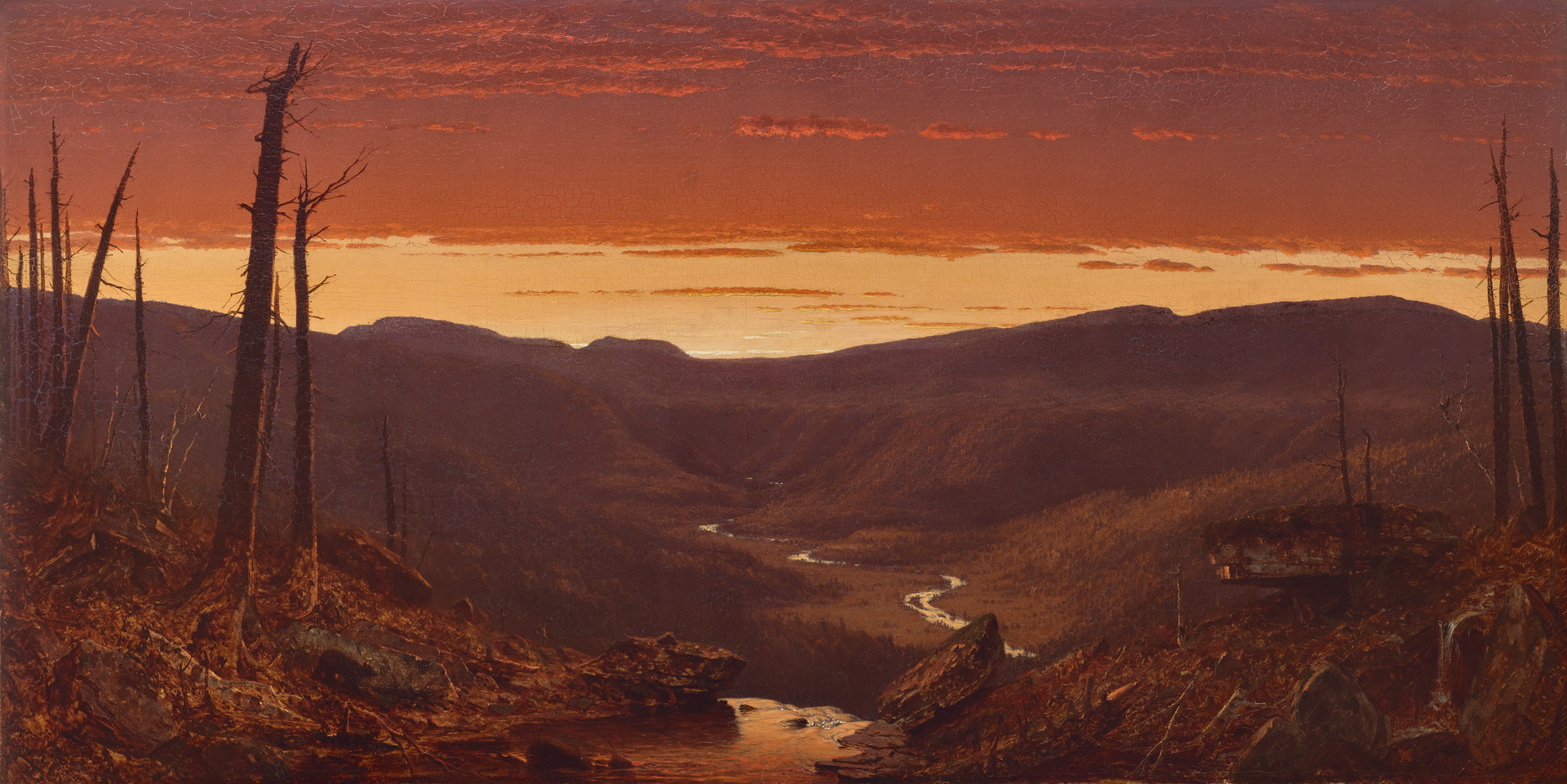
Sanford Robinson Gifford's A Twilight in the Catskills (1861)

In 1860 the painting was exhibited from June 8 to July 25 at Goupil's in New York City. It was well received, with contemporary viewers relating its purity of nature with spirituality. Critics described it as a "scene unhistoric, with no other interest than that of a wilderness, without human association of any kind" and "Nature with folded hands, kneeling at her evening prayer". Others saw "merely" nature, such as the Cosmopolitan Art Journal, which called it "unworthy of the artist, being a mere piece of scene painting, which it was a vanity to exhibit".

Huntington emphasized the connection between pristine wilderness and the cultural sense of American exceptionalism. He highlighted the painting tradition that Church incorporated, and reinvented, for a uniquely American art:

[Twilight in the Wilderness] was his final solution to the heroic representation of the New World's classic image.... Church had learned what he could from Cole and from the Dusseldorf painters. Turner, Ruskin, and the Old Masters were the influences which would henceforth guide Church to his maturity.... in Twilight in the Wilderness, Church for the first time presented this all-important American subject at the level of history-painting in the Great Tradition—an Adamic Poussin. He caused the trees in this painting to act like the figures in the Old Masters he collected; yet the trees appear to be perfectly natural.... To create it, Church may well have heeded Ruskin's counsel that the artist should respond to the spiritual message suggested in nature's transcendent moments.... According to American doctrine, pure nature's "transcendent moments" should be accessible to all: no need for an Anglican "High Priest of Nature" to intercede between man and his universe.... As New World man and therefore "Nature's favorite," he was quite content with nature as she was.... His responsibility to humanity on this side of the Atlantic was not to manipulate but to re-create nature, quintessential nature.

For receptive viewers, the painting contains discrete religious symbols: the tree stump is a "wilderness altar" on which there is a small cross formed of wood splinters, and the outline of an angel is apparent; the three trees that frame the scene at right symbolize the three crosses at Calvary. Huntington suggests that a small cloud fragment (or alternately a small gap in the clouds), located by following the line of the tree stump, evokes the "Dove of the Holy Spirit".

The American wilderness and turbulent sky pictured here, as night descends, have been interpreted apocalyptically, as a metaphor for a country falling into discord on the brink of the Civil War. In this context, the painting is considered patriotic. Sanford Robinson Gifford's A Twilight in the Catskills (1860) has been interpreted similarly.

== Provenance ==
Twilight in the Wilderness was commissioned for William T. Walters. It was acquired by John Taylor Johnston in 1866, and then sold to John Work Garrett in 1876. It was inherited by his daughter Mary Garrett, and sold to family friend (and John Taylor Johnston's son-in-law) Robert de Forest. His brother Lockwood de Forest inherited it in 1931, and the painting descended through the family until sold by Lockwood's grandson in the 1960s. It was bought by the Cleveland Museum of Art in 1965.

== See also ==
- List of paintings by Frederic Edwin Church
