= The Parthenon (painting) =

1871 painting by Frederic Edwin Church

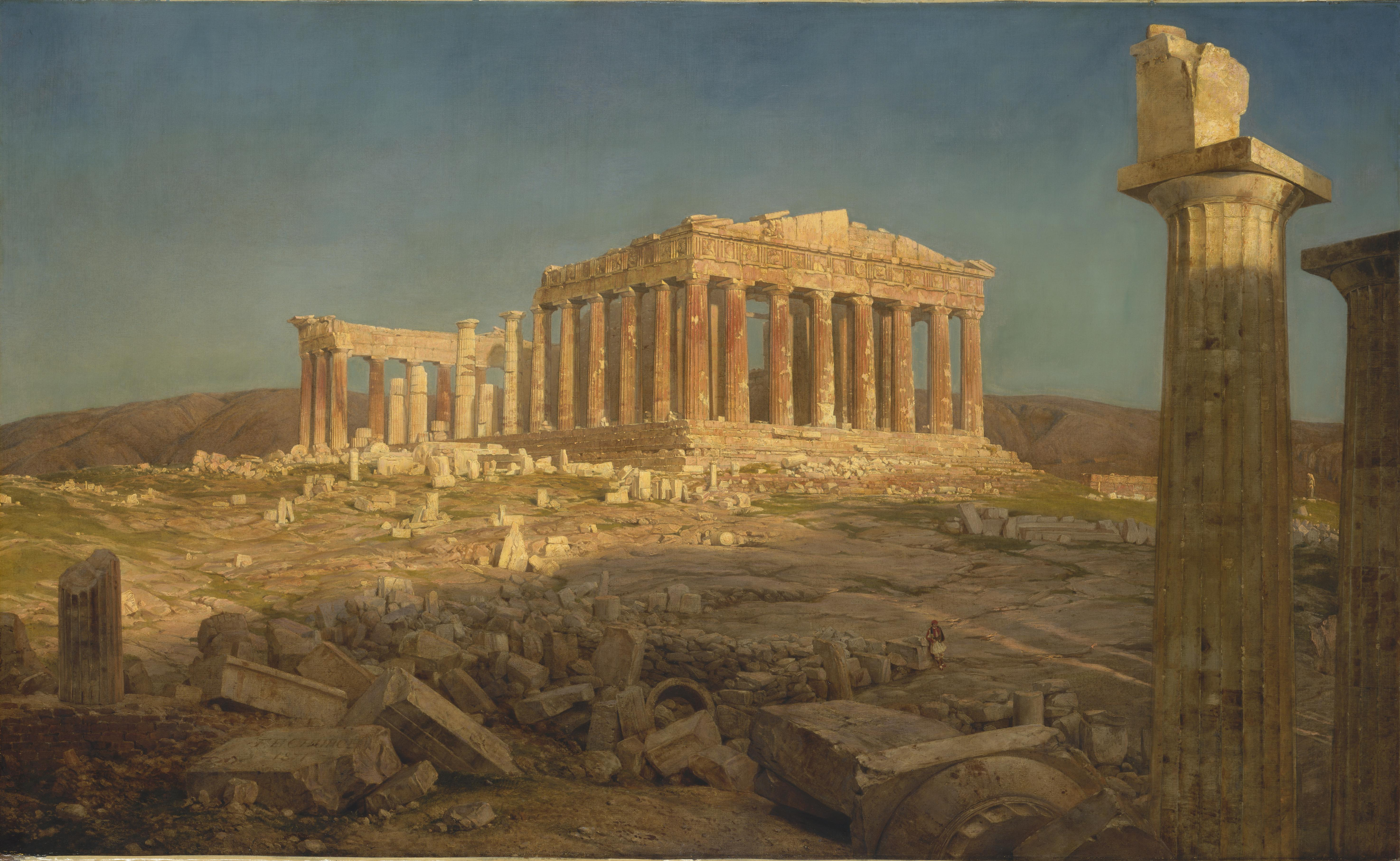
- Artist: Frederic Edwin Church
- Year: 1871
- Medium: Oil on canvas
- Dimensions: 113 cm × 184.5 cm (44 in × 72.6 in)
- Location: Metropolitan Museum of Art, New York City
- Accession: 15.30.67

The Parthenon is a large 1871 painting by American artist Frederic Edwin Church which is in the collection of the Metropolitan Museum of Art, New York City.

Church visited Greece in 1869 and spent several weeks in Athens, where he made numerous studies of the ruins of the Parthenon that later served as the basis for the work. In 1871 a commission from the financier and philanthropist Morris K. Jesup finally allowed Church to begin work on his "big Parthenon".

The painting is on view at the Metropolitan Museum's Gallery 760.

== See also ==
- List of paintings by Frederic Edwin Church
