= The Andes of Ecuador =

Painting by Frederic Edwin Church

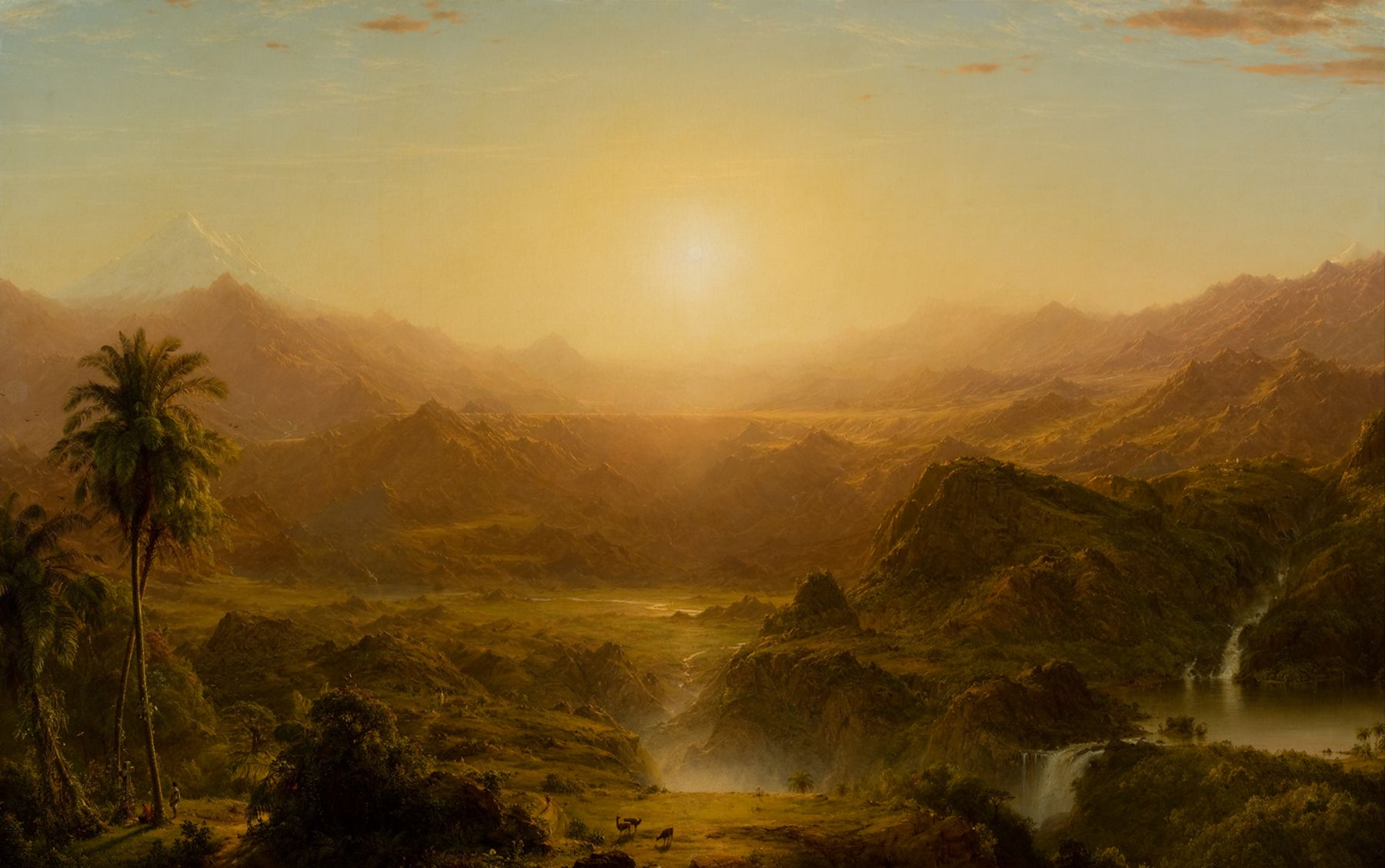
- Artist: Frederic Edwin Church
- Year: 1855
- Medium: oil on canvas
- Dimensions: 121.9 cm × 194.3 cm (48.0 in × 76.5 in)
- Location: Reynolda House Museum of American Art; Winston-Salem, North Carolina

The Andes of Ecuador is an 1855 oil painting by Frederic Edwin Church, the premier American landscape painter of the time. It is the most significant result of his 1853 trip to South America, where he would travel again in 1857. It is Church's first major painting, his largest work at the time, and "an early masterpiece of Luminism", according to the Reynolda House Museum of American Art in Winston-Salem, North Carolina, which holds the painting.

== Background and description ==
The painting is a composite image of different climate zones, from snowy mountains in the distance to grasslands in the mid-ground and tropical flora in the foreground. Church's approach to landscape painting was influenced by Prussian naturalist Alexander von Humboldt, who wrote of his travels in South America and exhorted painters to capture the beauty of the New World. Around the Chota Valley, Humboldt marvelled at the Andes' "symmetrical disposition in two lines from north to south", and noted that a plateau rather than a valley separated them. Thus the mountains in The Andes of Ecuador—probably Tungurahua at left and Cotopaxi at right—are arranged along two lines that would converge near the painting's center. The plateau is a strong horizontal line just beneath that point. Humboldt encouraged painters to make sketches in the field, a practice not then common, and this painting shows the influence of Church's sketches in northern Ecuador and southern Colombia.

In 1859, after his second trip south, Church painted his monumental The Heart of the Andes, another composite of South American landscapes and a re-interpretation of Humboldt's aesthetic ideas. The Andes of Ecuador depicted little tropical flora and its details were subdued by the strong light. (A contemporary critic in Harper's Weekly commented that "all detail, all shape [is] lost in the vastness of the gorges".) It excluded Chimborazo, the Ecuadorian mountain then thought to be the world's highest. In the 1859 painting, Church more clearly cataloged the diversity of plants and topography, culminating in Chimborazo, and used a more naturalistic lighting.

The Andes of Ecuador retains some of the influence of Church's teacher, Thomas Cole. Cole believed that details should be limited in the search for a general, sublime effect. Although the painting is highly detailed throughout, the strong light of the Sun subordinates these details, providing the overall effect that Cole espoused. (This would not be the case in The Heart of the Andes, which is given over to detail.) The sunlight casts the whole image in its radiance, making the distant mountains faint and creating shadows on the small foreground details like the grazing llamas. The painting of the Sun is noticeably built up in oils of white and yellow, in contrast to the smoothness of the other areas. Any criticism of the painting likely opined that the lighting was too strong.

== Themes ==
Church, like Cole, continued to evoke Christian themes in his landscapes. Two small staffage figures visit a stone cross near the palm trees at bottom left, and a red-roofed Spanish mission appears at the end of the path near them. Most significant is the intersection of the sun's golden vertical rays with the plateau's line, forming a large but subtle cross.

Church's art encouraged contemporary viewers to ponder on the spiritual and cosmic questions evoked therein. Church scholar David C. Huntington wrote in 1980 of The Andes of Ecuador:

Like Adam at the dawn of human consciousness the beholder awakens to the beauty of the earth which has been so long preparing for him. Yet this first awakening is, in effect, the type for a reawakening into a higher consciousness, which is the consciousness of a soul reborn in Christ, as with fresh eyes he "sees all things new". The old dispensation is manifest in the guise of the church and wayside shrine, each marked by a cross. The new dispensation is manifest in the guise of a heavenly cross whose all-pervasive radiant light blesses and hallows all nature. As the crosses made by human hands adumbrate the cross made by divine hands, so has the sequel of ever higher orders of life through aeons adumbrated the mind-spirit which now, for the first time, contemplates Creation with "Intelligence". As he "soars" suspended between earth and heaven in the presence of Andes of Ecuador and looks out upon the world's divinity, the spectator becomes a "demi-god".

== Provenance ==
The painting was exhibited at the Boston Athenæum in early 1855, where it was seen by Henry Thoreau. It was bought by the railway tycoon William H. Osborn, and remained in the family until 1965. After passing through the hands of investment banker J. William Middendorf II and Kennedy Galleries, it was bought by the Reynolda House Museum of American Art in 1966.

== See also ==
- List of paintings by Frederic Edwin Church
