= Our Banner in the Sky =

1861 painting by Frederic Edwin Church

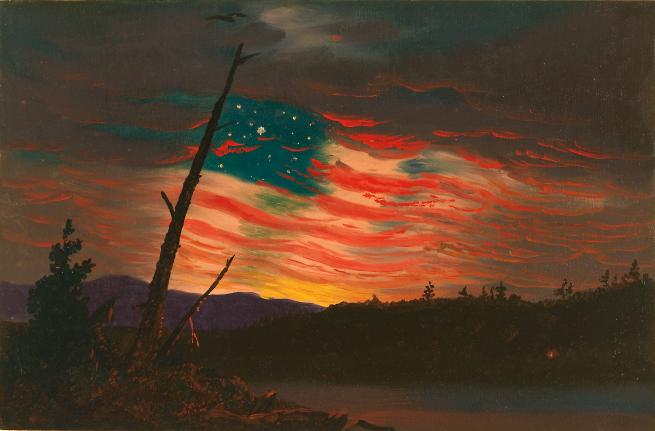
- Artist: Frederic Edwin Church
- Year: 1861
- Catalogue: TL42458.1
- Medium: Oil on paper (Note: Oil on paper mounted on paperboard)
- Movement: Hudson River School
- Dimensions: 19 cm × 29 cm (7 1/2 in × 11 3/8 in)
- Location: Harvard Art Museums (Note: Location: Level 2, Room 2100, European and American Art, 17th–19th century, Centuries of Tradition, Changing Times: Art for an Uncertain Age)
- Website: hvrd.art/o/377171

Our Banner in the Sky is an 1861 painting by Frederic Edwin Church, an American landscape painter of the Hudson River School.

The painting is a landscape featuring a section of sky made to resemble the American flag with a barren tree acting as its pole. After the onset of the American Civil War, Church wanted the piece to show his patriotism for the Union. As a member of the Hudson River School and a student of Thomas Cole, Church combined the flag with a dramatic natural landscape.

== Historical context ==
Church was at this point in his career one of the most famous artists in the country after his well-received works such as Niagara (1857) and The Heart of the Andes (1859). Being a student of Thomas Cole and a member of the Hudson River School, Church's works were characterized by dramatic landscapes, sometimes with the intended purpose to show the spirit of the nation. In 1861, he planned to show his new landscape, The Icebergs, but on April 12 the bombing (and later surrender) of Fort Sumter occurred, starting the American Civil War.

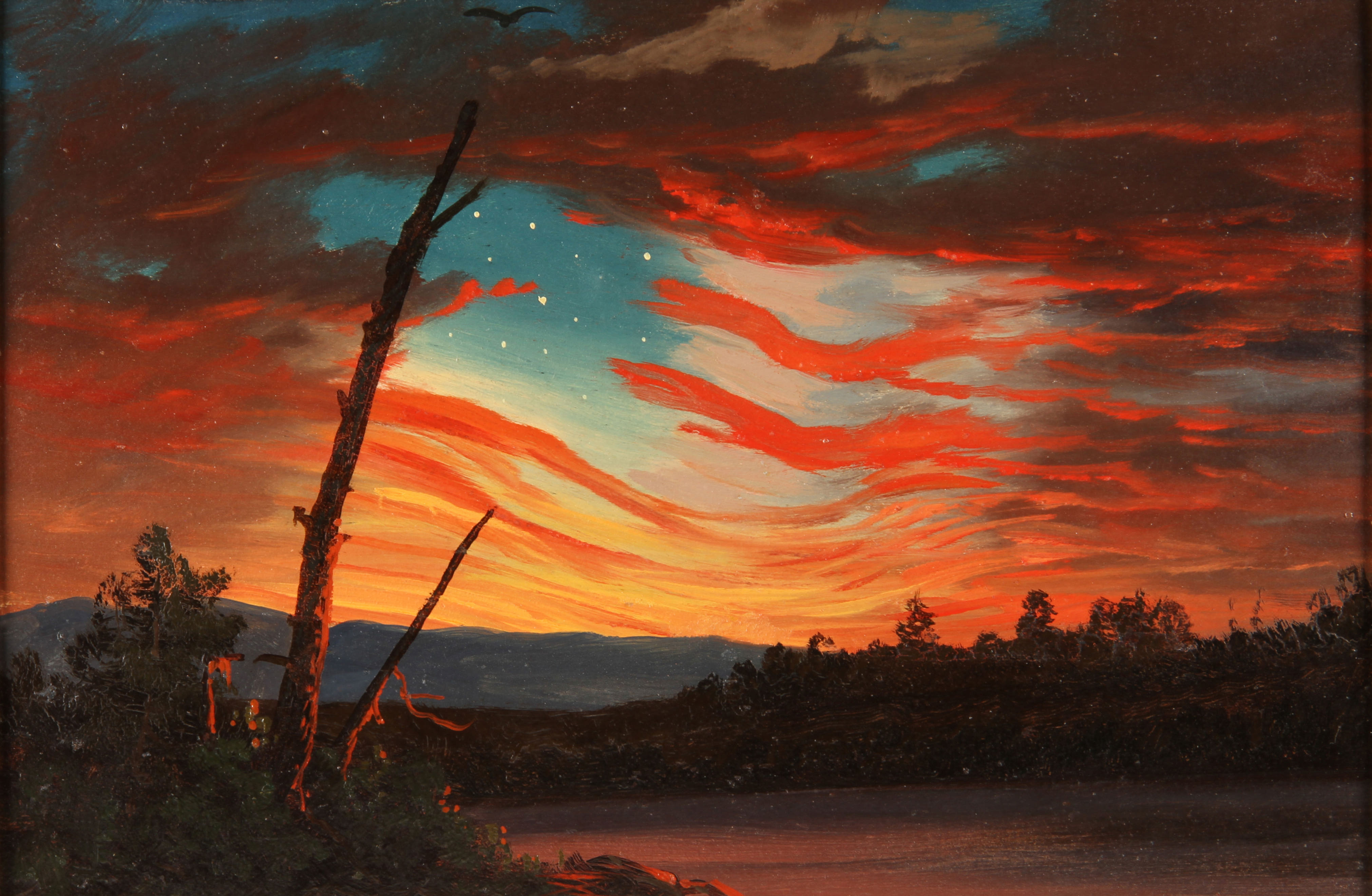
Another version of the painting.

Church, who was along with the rest of the country taken up by patriotic fervor, then quickly changed the name from The Icebergs to The North and donated money from the reception to the Union's Patriotic Fund for the families of Union soldiers. Still, though, Church wanted to do more with his art for the Union cause, something expressly American; less than a month later, Church painted Our Banner in the Sky.

== Painting and composition ==
Our Banner in the Sky is a small, oil paint over lithograph on paper, laid down on cardboard, measuring 7 1/2 by 11 3/8 inches (19 cm × 29 cm) landscape. The painting features a dramatic sunrise depicting a central transient American flag formed from clouds, stars, and the sky. A barren pine to the left of the flag acts as its pole. It could be interpreted that the light from the sunrise is employed by Church to show the American cause in the war has been a divine moral purpose.

== Reception ==
The painting was well received in the North. Some viewers wrote poems on the work. In June 1861, Goupil & Co. paid Church $200 for a chromolithograph of it so middle-class Americans could buy colored copies of the work. Some people illegally produced unofficial chromolithographs of it.

== See also ==
- List of paintings by Frederic Edwin Church
