= Ignace Fougeron =

British engraver

Ignace Fougeron, also known as Ignatius Fougeron or J. Fougeron, was a British engraver active from 1750 to 1782. He was likely from a Huguenot family living in London.

== Works ==
Fougeron produced a handcolored, accurate engraving of An East View of the Great Cataract of Niagara after Thomas Davies, which was published in his Six Views of North American Waterfalls (c. 1763–1768).

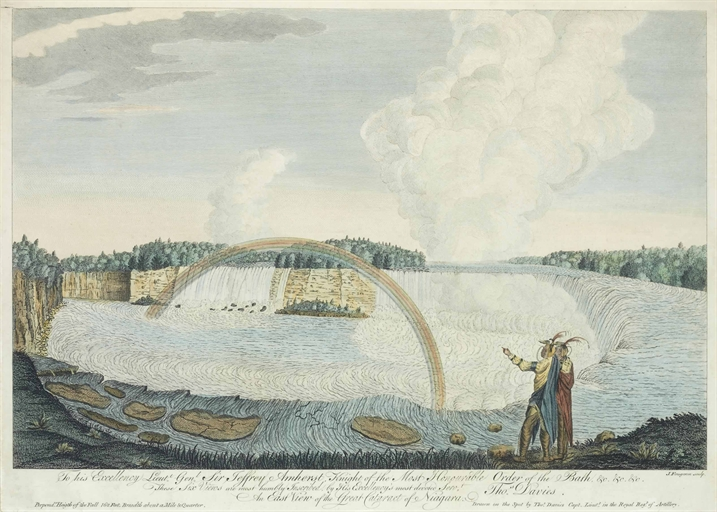
An East View of the Great Cataract of Niagara (c. 1763–1768), after Thomas Davies

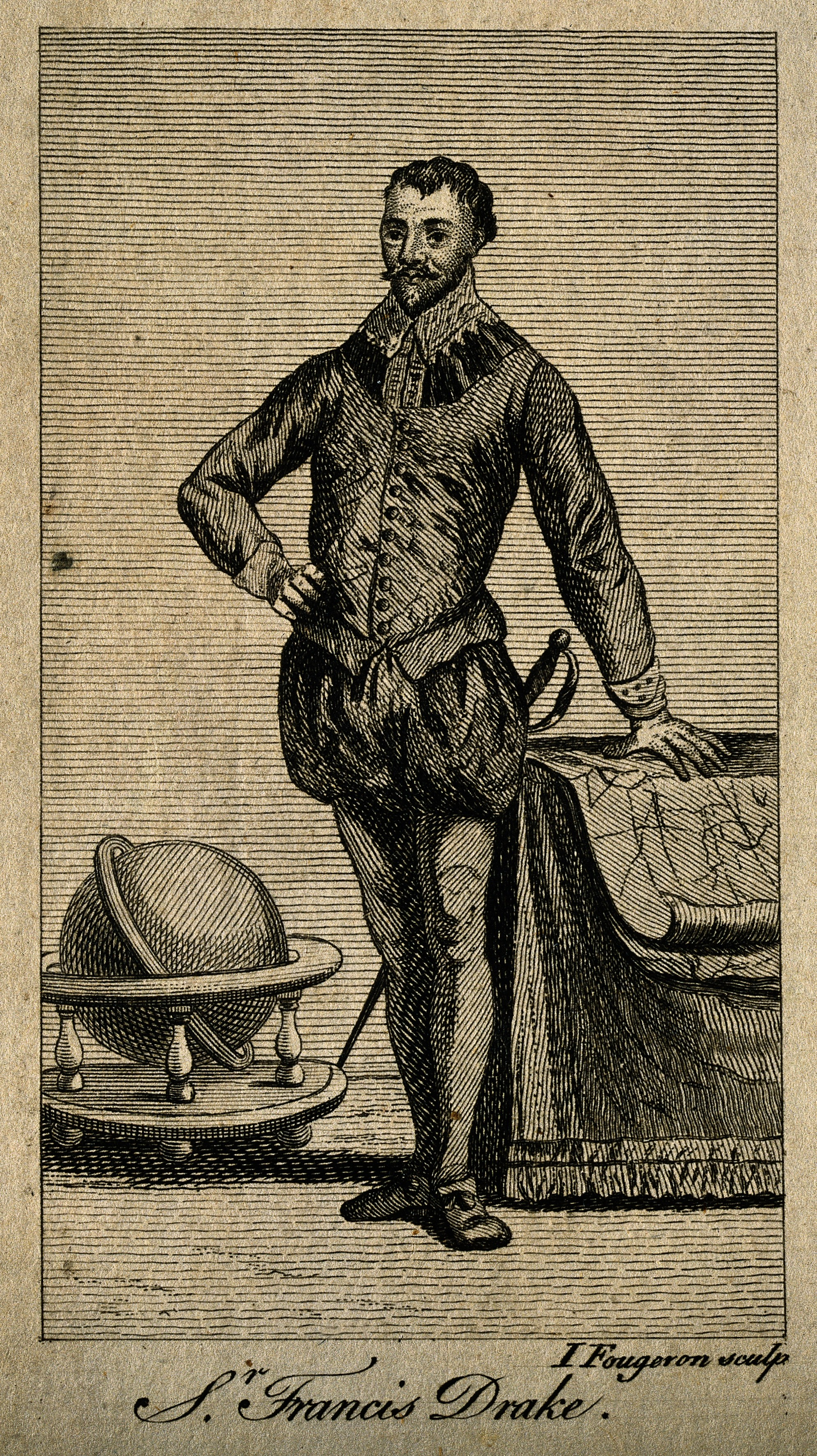
Sir Francis Drake, line engraving

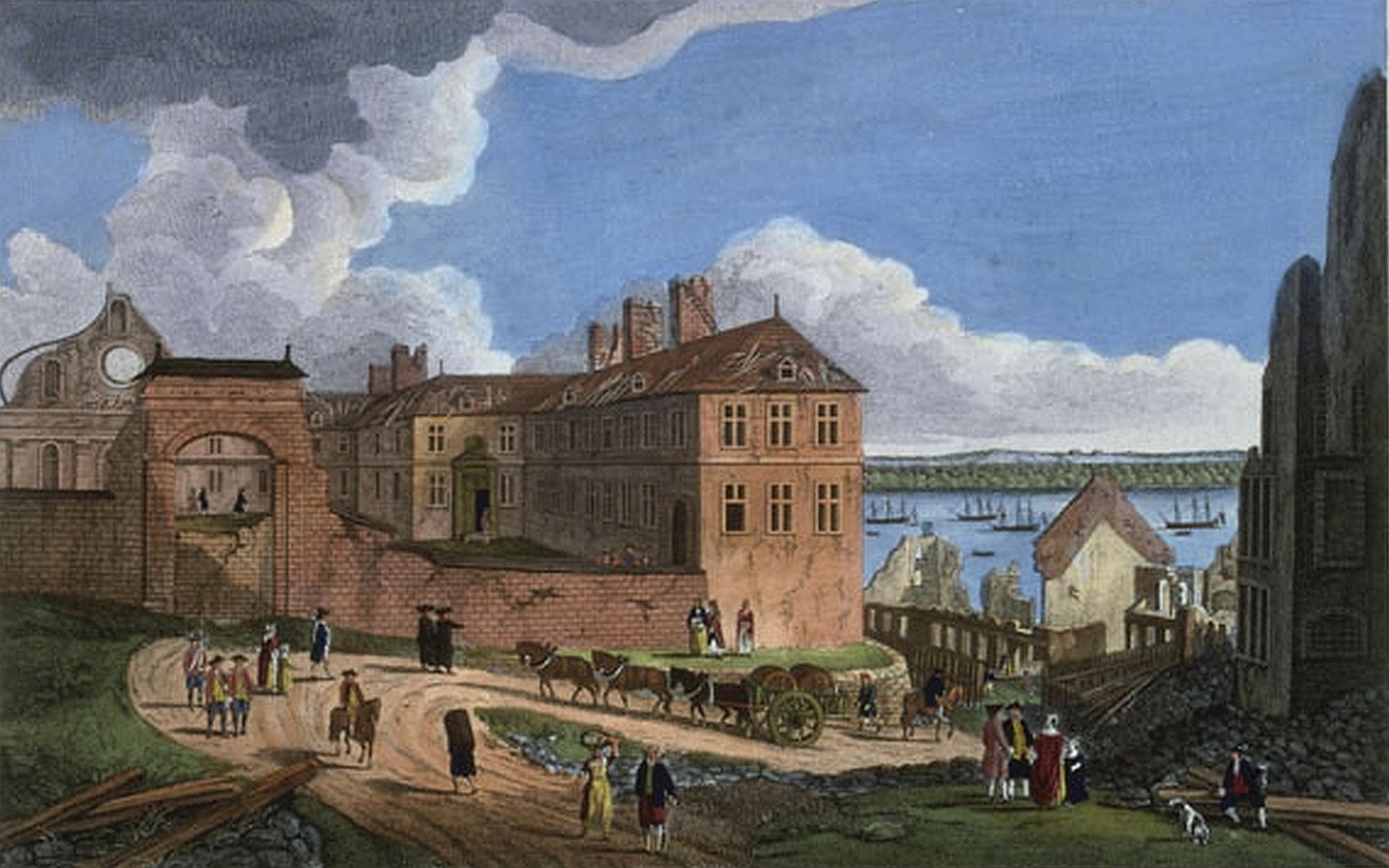
A View of the Bishop's House with the Ruins as they appear in going down the Hill from the Upper to the Lower Town (1761), after Richard Short
