= List of paintings by Frederic Edwin Church =

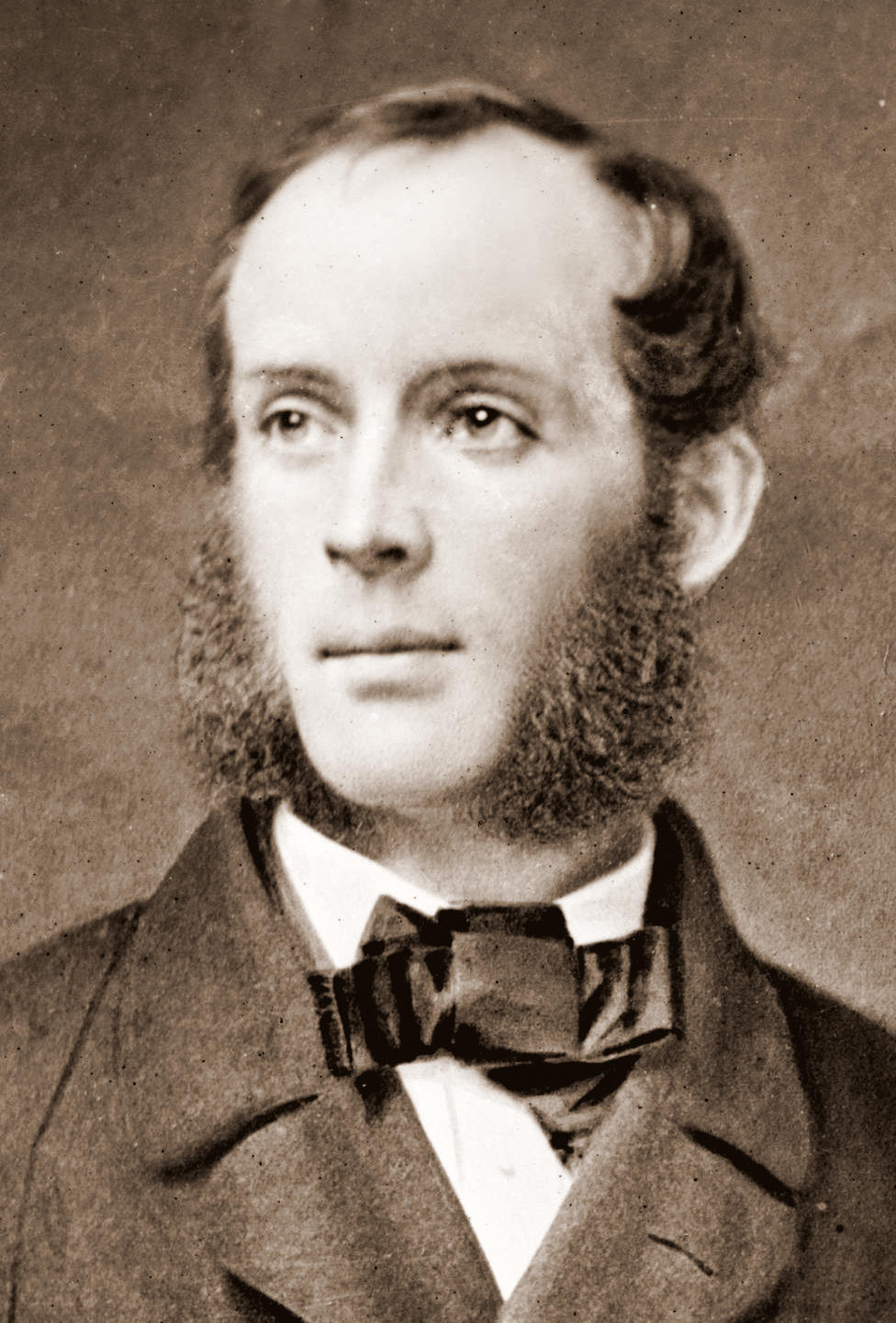
Frederic E. Church (portrait by Mathew Brady)

This is a list of paintings by Frederic Edwin Church (1826–1900), an American landscape painter who was part of the Hudson River School. Church's paintings were inspired by his travels, including Africa, Europe, the Middle East, South America, and North America. Sketches are excluded—Church made thousands—unless they are in oil and very finished.

== Works ==
Painting	Name	Year	Technique	Dimensions (H×W)	Current Location
	Niagara Falls (Horseshoe Falls)	c. 1844	Oil on canvas	111.4 × 119.1 cm	Gilcrease Museum, Tulsa, Oklahoma
	Hooker and Company Journeying through the Wilderness from Plymouth to Hartford, in 1636	1846	Oil on canvas	102.24 × 153.35 cm	Wadsworth Atheneum, Hartford, Connecticut
	Moses Viewing the Promised Land	1846	Oil on academy board	25.4 × 31.75 cm	Private collection
	Storm in the Mountains	1847	Oil on canvas	75.5 × 62.8 cm	Cleveland Museum of Art
	July Sunset (also July Sunset, Berkshire County, Massachusetts)	1847	Oil on canvas	29 in × 40 3/8 in (740 mm × 1,030 mm)	Private collection
	North Lake	1847	Oil on canvas	12 in × 19 in (300 mm × 480 mm)	Private collection
	To the Memory of Cole	1848	Oil on canvas	81.3 × 124.5 cm	Private collection
	View in Pittsford, Vermont	1848	Oil on academy board	11 in × 16 1/4 in (280 mm × 410 mm)	Private collection
	Morning, Looking East over the Hudson Valley from Catskill Mountains	1848	Oil on canvas	45.72 × 60.96 cm	Albany Institute of History and Art, New York
	West Rock, New Haven	1849	Oil on canvas	27 1/8 in × 40 1/8 in (690 mm × 1,020 mm)	New Britain Museum of American Art, Connecticut
	Mountain Landscape	1849	Oil on canvas	34.6 × 48.5 cm	Brauer Museum of Art, Valparaiso, Indiana
	Above the Clouds at Sunrise	1849	Oil on canvas	69.2 × 102.2 cm	Metropolitan Museum of Art, New York
	Abandoned Skiff	1850	Oil on cardboard	28 × 43.2 cm	Thyssen-Bornemisza Museum, Spain
	Twilight, "Short Arbiter 'Twixt Day and Night" (Sunset)	1850	Oil on canvas	32.25 in × 48 in (819 mm × 1,219 mm)	Newark Museum, Newark, New Jersey
	Fog off Mount Desert	1850	Oil on board	30.48 × 39.37 cm	Private collection
	Otter Creek, Mt. Desert	1850	Oil on canvas		Museum of Fine Arts, Boston, Massachusetts
	Beacon, off Mount Desert Island	1851	Oil on canvas	31 in × 46 in (790 mm × 1,170 mm)	Private collection
	New England Scenery	1851	Oil on canvas		George Walter Vincent Smith Art Museum, Massachusetts
	Camp Fire in the Maine Wilderness	1851–59	Oil on canvas	43.82 × 69.14 cm	Private collection
	The Wreck	1852	Oil on canvas	76.2 × 116.84 cm	The Parthenon, United States
	Grand Manan Island, Bay of Fundy	1852	Oil on canvas	55.4 × 81.12 cm	Public collection
	Home by the Lake	1852	Oil on canvas	81.28 × 122.55 cm	Public collection
	Coast Scene	1852	Oil on canvas	20 in × 30 in (510 mm × 760 mm)	Private collection
	The Natural Bridge, Virginia	1852	Oil on canvas		University of Virginia Art Museum
	Autumn (also Autumn on the Hudson)	1853	Oil on canvas	20 in × 30 1/2 in (510 mm × 770 mm)	Private collection
	Mt. Ktaadn (Mt. Katahdin)	1853	Oil on canvas		Yale University Art Gallery, Connecticut
	Summer in South America	c. 1853	Oil on board		Frances Lehman Loeb Art Center, Poughkeepsie, New York
	The Falls of the Tequendama near Bogota, New Granada	1854	Oil on canvas	162.6 cm x 101.6	Cincinnati Art Museum
	La Magdalena aka Scene on the Magdalena	1854	Oil on canvas	71.12 × 106.68 cm	Private collection
	The Cordilleras: Sunrise	1854	Oil on canvas	72.3 × 109.2 cm	Private collection
	A Country Home	1854	Oil on canvas	115.89 × 161.61 cm	Seattle Art Museum, Washington
	Tamaca Palms	1854	Oil on canvas	68 × 91.4 cm	National Gallery of Art, Washington, DC
	Cotopaxi	1855	Oil on canvas	71.12 × 107 cm	Smithsonian American Art Museum, Washington, D.C.
	The Andes of Ecuador	1855	Oil on canvas	121.9 cm × 194.3 cm	Reynolda House Museum of American Art, Winston-Salem, North Carolina
	Cotopaxi	1855	Oil on canvas	30 in × 46.44 in (762 mm × 1,180 mm)	Museum of Fine Arts, Houston, Texas
	Tropical Landscape	c. 1855	Oil on canvas	28 × 41.3 cm	Thyssen-Bornemisza Museum, Madrid
	South American Landscape	1856	Oil on canvas	59.5 × 92 cm	Thyssen-Bornemisza Museum, Madrid
	Twilight (Sunset)	1856	Oil on canvas	16 1/4 in × 24 1/4 in (410 mm × 620 mm)	Albany Institute of History & Art
	Sunset	1856	Oil on canvas	61 × 91.4 cm	Munson-Williams-Proctor Arts Institute, Utica, New York
	Autumn in North America	1856	Oil on board	28.58 × 43.18 cm	Thyssen-Bornemisza Museum(?)
	Cross in the Wilderness	1857	Oil on board	41.3 × 61.5 cm	Thyssen-Bornemisza Museum, Madrid
	Sunset in the Berkshire Hills	1857	Oil on canvas	28 1/2 in × 35 in (720 mm × 890 mm)	Woodmere Art Museum, Philadelphia
	View of Cotopaxi	1857	Oil on canvas	62.2 × 92.7 cm	Art Institute of Chicago, Illinois
	View on the Magdalena River	1857	Oil on canvas	23 3/4 in × 36 in (600 mm × 910 mm)	Virginia Museum of Fine Arts, Richmond, VA
	Niagara	1857	Oil on canvas	106.5 × 229.9 cm	National Gallery of Art, Washington, DC
	Morning in the Tropics	c. 1858	Oil on canvas	21 × 35.5 cm	Walters Art Museum, Baltimore, MD
	Twilight, Mount Ktaadn	c. 1858–60	Oil on paper mounted on board	10 1/2 in × 13 5/8 in (270 mm × 350 mm)	Collection of Henry and Sharon Martin
	The Heart of the Andes	1859	Oil on canvas	167.9 × 302.9 cm	Metropolitan Museum of Art, New York
	The Meteor of 1860	c. 1860–61	Oil on canvas	10 in × 17 1/2 in (250 mm × 440 mm)	Private collection
	Twilight in the Wilderness	1860	Oil on canvas	101.6 × 162.6 cm	Cleveland Museum of Art, Ohio
	The Icebergs	1861	Oil on canvas	163.83 × 285.75 cm	Dallas Museum of Art, Texas
	Our Banner in the Sky	1861	Oil on paper	7.5 in × 11.25 in (191 mm × 286 mm)	Private collection
	Oosisoak	c. 1861	Oil on canvas	23 in × 17 in (580 mm × 430 mm)	Private collection
	Cotopaxi (painting)	1862	Oil on canvas		Detroit Institute of Arts, Michigan
	The Setting Sun	1864	Oil on canvas	9 1/2 in × 14 in (240 mm × 360 mm)	Private collection
	Chimborazo	1864	Oil on canvas	48 in × 84 in (1,200 mm × 2,100 mm)	The Huntington Library, California
	Mount Chimborazo	1865	Oil on canvas	7 1/8 in × 12 3/8 in (180 mm × 310 mm)	Olana State Historic Site, New York
	Aurora Borealis	1865	Oil on canvas	142.6 × 212.1 cm	Smithsonian American Art Museum, Washington, D.C.
	Twilight, Mount Desert Island, Maine	1865	Oil on canvas	31 5/16 in × 48 7/16 in (795 mm × 1,230 mm)	Mildred Lane Kemper Art Museum, St. Louis
	Rainy Season in the Tropics	1866	Oil on canvas	56.25 in × 84.25 in (1,429 mm × 2,140 mm)	Fine Arts Museums of San Francisco, San Francisco, California
	Pichincha	1867	Oil on canvas		Philadelphia Museum of Art, Pennsylvania
	View of Cotopaxi	1867	Oil on canvas		Yale University Art Gallery, Connecticut
	Vale of St Thomas, Jamaica	1867	Oil on canvas	122.7 × 214.9 cm	Wadsworth Atheneum, Hartford, Connecticut
	Niagara Falls, from the American Side	1867	Oil on canvas	101 × 89 in	Scottish National Gallery, Edinburgh
	Jerusalem from the Mount of Olives	1870	Oil on canvas	137.8 × 214.3 cm	Nelson-Atkins Museum of Art
	The Parthenon	1871	Oil on canvas	44 1/2 in × 72 5/8 in (1,130 mm × 1,840 mm)	Metropolitan Museum of Art, New York
	View from Olana in the Snow	c. 1870–75	Oil on academy board mounted on Masonite	13 1/4 in × 21 in (340 mm × 530 mm)	Colby College of Museum of Art, Maine
	Figures in an Ecuadorian Landscape	1872	Oil on canvas	53.34 x 91.44 cm	Private collection
	Passing Shower in the Tropics	1872	Oil on canvas	31 × 51 cm	Princeton University Art Museum
	Syria by the Sea	1873	Oil on canvas	56 in × 85 in (1,400 mm × 2,200 mm)	Detroit Institute of Arts, Michigan
	Tropical Scenery (South American Landscape)	1873	Oil on canvas	97.3 × 152.2 cm	Brooklyn Museum, New York
	Syrian Landscape (also Landscape in Greece)	1873	Oil on panel	15 1/2 in × 22 1/2 in (390 mm × 570 mm)	Private collection
	El Khasné, Petra	1874	Oil on canvas	153.7 × 127.6 cm	Olana State Historic Site
	Autumn	1875	Oil on canvas	39.4 × 61 cm	Thyssen-Bornemisza Museum, Madrid
	The Iceberg	c. 1875	Oil on canvas	55.9 x 68.6 cm	Terra Foundation for American Art
	The Aegean Sea	c. 1877	Oil on canvas	54 in × 63 1/4 in (1,370 mm × 1,610 mm)	Metropolitan Museum of Art, New York
	El Rio de Luz (The River of Light)	1877	Oil on canvas	138.1 cm × 213.7 cm	National Gallery of Art, Washington, D.C.
	Landscape in the Adirondacks	1878	Oil on canvas	8 1/2 in × 13 in (220 mm × 330 mm)	Private collection
	The Monastery of San Pedro	1879	Oil on canvas	118.8 × 183.2 cm	Cleveland Museum of Art
	Springtime in the Levant	1879	Oil on canvas	31 in × 48 in (790 mm × 1,220 mm)	Private collection
	Marine—Sunset	1881–82	Oil on canvas	30 1/2 in × 42 in (770 mm × 1,070 mm)	Private collection
	Al Ayn (also known as The Fountain)	1882	Oil on canvas		Mead Art Museum, Massachusetts
	Sierra Nevada de Santa Marta	1883	Oil on canvas	40 1/16 in × 60 1/8 in (1,018 mm × 1,527 mm)	Mildred Lane Kemper Art Museum, St. Louis
	Chimborazo Volcano	1884	Oil on canvas		Yale University Art Gallery, Connecticut
	Moonrise	1889	Oil on canvas		Santa Barbara Museum of Art, California
	The Iceberg	1891	Oil on canvas	71.63 × 99.69 cm	Carnegie Museum of Art, Pennsylvania
	Mount Katahdin from Millinocket Camp	1895	Oil on canvas	26 1/2 in × 42 1/4 in (670 mm × 1,070 mm)	Portland Museum of Art, Maine
