= Niagara (Frederic Edwin Church) =

1857 painting by Frederic Edwin Church

- Artist: Frederic Edwin Church
- Year: 1857
- Medium: oil on canvas
- Dimensions: 101.6 cm × 229.9 cm (40.0 in × 90.5 in)
- Location: Corcoran Collection, National Gallery of Art, Washington, D.C.
- Accession: 2014.79.10

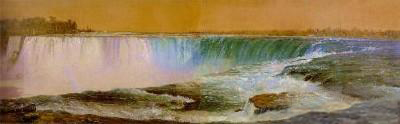
The final study for the painting. Horseshoe Falls, Niagara, 1856–57, oil on two pieces of paper, 29.2 × 90.5 cm. Olana State Historic Site

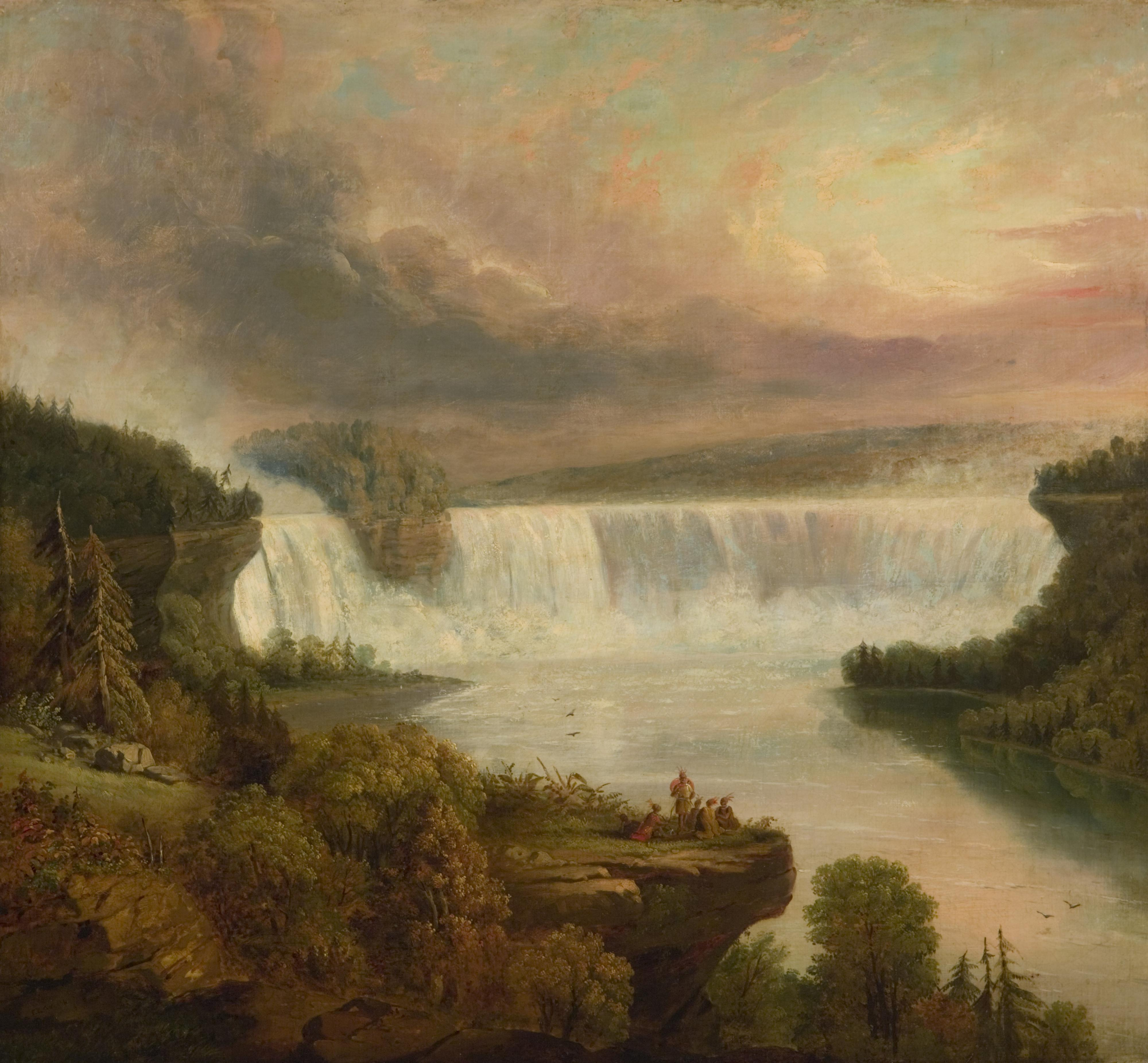
Church had also painted Horseshoe Falls in 1844

Niagara is an oil painting produced in 1857 by the American artist Frederic Edwin Church. Niagara, which portrays the Horseshoe Falls portion of Niagara Falls, was Church's most important work at the time and confirmed his reputation as the premier American landscape painter of the era. In his history of Niagara Falls, Pierre Berton writes, "Of the hundreds of paintings made of Niagara, before Church and after him, this is by common consent the greatest."

== Background ==
The Falls were commonly painted, being such an attraction to landscape artists that, writes John Howat, they were "the most popular, the most often treated, and the tritest single item of subject matter to appear in eighteenth- and nineteenth-century European and American landscape painting". Moreover, the public was captivated by the natural wonder of the Falls, considered a landmark of the North American landscape and a major tourist destination. It was the "Honeymoon Capital of the World", and prints of Niagara were given as wedding gifts. In the 1850s, Niagara was the subject of millions of stereographs, and its image could be found on wallpaper, china, and lampshades, among other consumer items. In 1853, a 1600-foot moving panorama of Niagara Falls was exhibited in New York City.

For Americans, the Falls symbolized the grandeur and expansionism of the United States. David C. Huntington, whose writing on Church in the 1960s revived interest in the painter, explained how Americans, in an era of spiritual optimism and manifest destiny, would have perceived such a vivid painting of Niagara, with all that it symbolized:

Church presented his fellow-men with the "soul" and "spirit" of Niagara, this "most suggestive" of nature's spectacles: this archetype of the universe. Niagara is the substance of a great American metaphor; indeed, for its original viewers, a certain something more than a metaphor.... Nature and its Bible, the Science of Design, would unfold the transcendent truth of the universe to the New Chosen People in the New World. Nature in the Era of Manifest Destiny was prophecy, and Church as the "interpreter" of Niagara was therefore painting as American prophet. Niagara is the American's mythical Deluge which washes away the memory of an Old World so that man may live at home in a New World. The painting is an icon of psychic natural purgation and rebirth. Poetically a New World emerges as the waters of a flood subside. The rainbow, sign of the "God of Nature's" covenant with man, transfixes the beholder.... Niagara is a revelation of the cosmos to each and every man. Before this greatest of American landscapes the self-reliant, democratic American becomes his own prophet: he stands and sees as a New Noah. Thus through the work of art did Mr. Church help his fellow-men to discover themselves in their New World.

Church studied Niagara Falls extensively leading up to 1857, making dozens of pencil and oil studies. In 1856 Church visited the Falls for probably the fifth time. His teacher Thomas Cole had also visited the Falls. A writer in Art and Artists in Connecticut (1879) reported that the painting itself took about six weeks and that Church used two similar canvases simultaneously: a "draft" upon which he tested a painting idea, and the final canvas, to which he transferred the results he found satisfactory.

== Description ==
Church's painting is of Horseshoe Falls, the largest and most iconic of Niagara's three waterfalls. With a width of 2.3 metres (7 ft 7 in), it is more than twice as wide as it is high. The canvas's unusual proportions allowed him to paint a panoramic view from the Canadian side of the falls; the composition leads the eye laterally. The vantage point was dramatic and unique, leaving behind the "canonical banality" of many other paintings before it, the merely picturesque, and immersing the viewer directly in the scene, as if airborne or even in the water. The lack of a repoussoir aids this effect. Before the advent of modern photography, which made such images common, this was a revelation.

Niagara is highly naturalistic, more so than Church's previous The Andes of Ecuador (1855), and shows the influence of John Ruskin's aesthetics on Church. Church brings the viewer to the lip of the falls, highlighting the impressive drop by painting in streams of water and cloudy mists. The only foreground object is a floating tree trunk, which might be confused for a branch but for its roots, providing a sense of scale. The white foam near the trunk has some build-up of paint on a canvas that is otherwise smooth. The foam might suggest that the tree is caught on an unseen rock; there is ambiguity in whether this location is a small respite of stability or highlights the imminent danger of reaching the fall's edge.

Church's extensive study of the falls allowed him to capture the effect of mist and turbulent water with unprecedented realism. The light creates a partial rainbow beyond the precipice, whose arc is strong where the mist is thick, and absent elsewhere, a highly realistic rendering and a technical achievement. Distant on the horizon are a number of buildings, including Terrapin Tower, on the platform of which stands a tiny person.

The painting accumulated damage over time, requiring Church to repaint some of it in 1886. He re-worked the sky so that it was more unified with the water, "more subservient to the cataract", but felt limited in the changes he could make by the many copies of the popular Niagara that existed at that point, in engraving and chromolithography.

== Exhibition and legacy ==
Church developed Niagara with public exhibitions in mind. Between May 1 and 29, 1857, tens of thousands paid 25 cents to view the painting—which was greatly praised by local critics—in a darkened Manhattan gallery in which only the painting was illuminated. Some would spend an hour in front of the painting: "Spectators forgot that they were looking simply at pigment ... The painting became the surrogate of a visit in person to the site." Many artists, writers, and politicians reportedly visited the painting's exhibition, including Horace Greeley, Henry Ward Beecher, George Bancroft, George Ripley, Charles Anderson Dana, and Fitz James O'Brien. Over a thousand subscriptions to a planned chromolithograph were sold; $30 for an artist's proof and $15 for a print, both in color. Harper's magazine called Niagara "more widely known and admired in this country than any other picture ever painted in America".

The painting was shown in England and Scotland in the summer of 1857. After a showing in London, a chromolithograph was made by Day & Son in June, followed by more exhibitions in Glasgow, Manchester, and Liverpool. London's Art-Journal wrote, "No work of its class has ever been more successful: it is truth, obviously and certainly. Considered as a painting, it is a production of rare merit: while admirable as a whole, its parts have been carefully considered and studied; broadly and effectively wrought, yet elaborately finished." Famed art critic John Ruskin was impressed, as reported by Church's friend Bayard Taylor: "The exhibitor told me that Ruskin had just been to see it, and that he had found effects in it which he had been waiting for years to find." Ruskin was said to have marvelled at the rainbow, believing at first that the play of light through a window was projected onto the canvas. In September 1858 Niagara returned to the United States, where, after another New York showing, it travelled to Washington, D.C., Baltimore, Richmond, and New Orleans. Cosmopolitan Art Journal wrote, "The reputation of this work has greatly increased by its English tour. It is now regarded as the finest painting ever executed by any American artist." Another exhibition in New York followed. Niagara was exhibited at the 1867 Exposition Universelle in Paris, where it won a silver medal and improved the European view of American art. Harper's Weekly wrote, "The European critics declared that the 'Niagara' gave them an entirely new and higher view both of American nature and art.

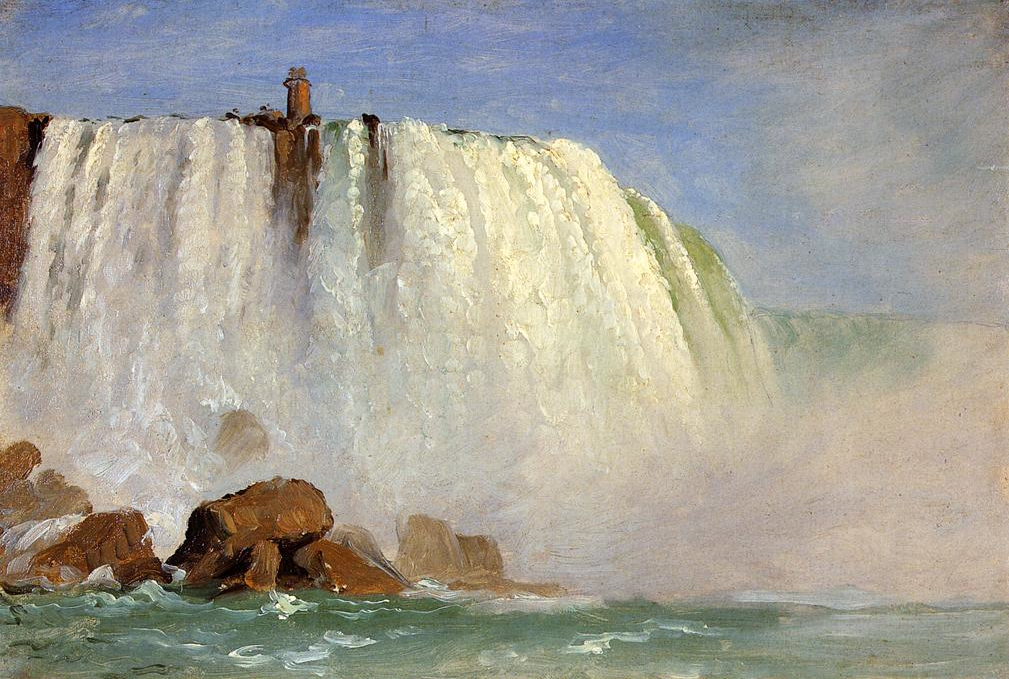
This study for Under Niagara (1862) is similar in composition to the lithograph of the lost painting.

Church's composition was the first painting from the Hudson River School to be an "instant success". It was uniquely realistic and "without 'manner'", marking the beginning of a new era for Hudson River artists, such as Jasper Francis Cropsey, Martin Johnson Heade, John Frederick Kensett, Albert Bierstadt, and Régis François Gignoux. Heade especially took to Niagara, which may have influenced some of his choices in canvas size. He wrote, "Church's picture ... far exceeds my expectations; & I don't wonder that Ruskin, after looking at it for half an hour, could only utter 'marvelous'. I look upon it as the most wonderful picture I ever saw."

Niagara was sold to the New York art dealers and print sellers Williams, Stevens & Williams—where it was first exhibited—for US$4,500 in 1857, including $2,000 for reproduction rights. It was acquired at auction in 1861 by the businessman John Taylor Johnston for US$5,000, and then bought at auction in 1876 by William Wilson Corcoran for his Gallery for $12,500, then a record for a painting by an American artist. When the Corcoran closed in 2014, its collection was transferred to the National Gallery of Art, also in Washington, D.C.

Church made two more finished paintings of the Falls. Under Niagara (1862) is now lost, but survives in lithographs, including an overpainted lithograph at Olana. It was a 4-by-6 foot painting said to be completed in a day. The third painting, Niagara Falls, from the American Side, was made in 1867 and is the largest of Church's paintings by surface area.

== See also ==
- List of paintings by Frederic Edwin Church
- An East View of the Great Cataract of Niagara, 1762 painting
