= Cotopaxi (painting) =

1862 painting by Frederic Edwin Church

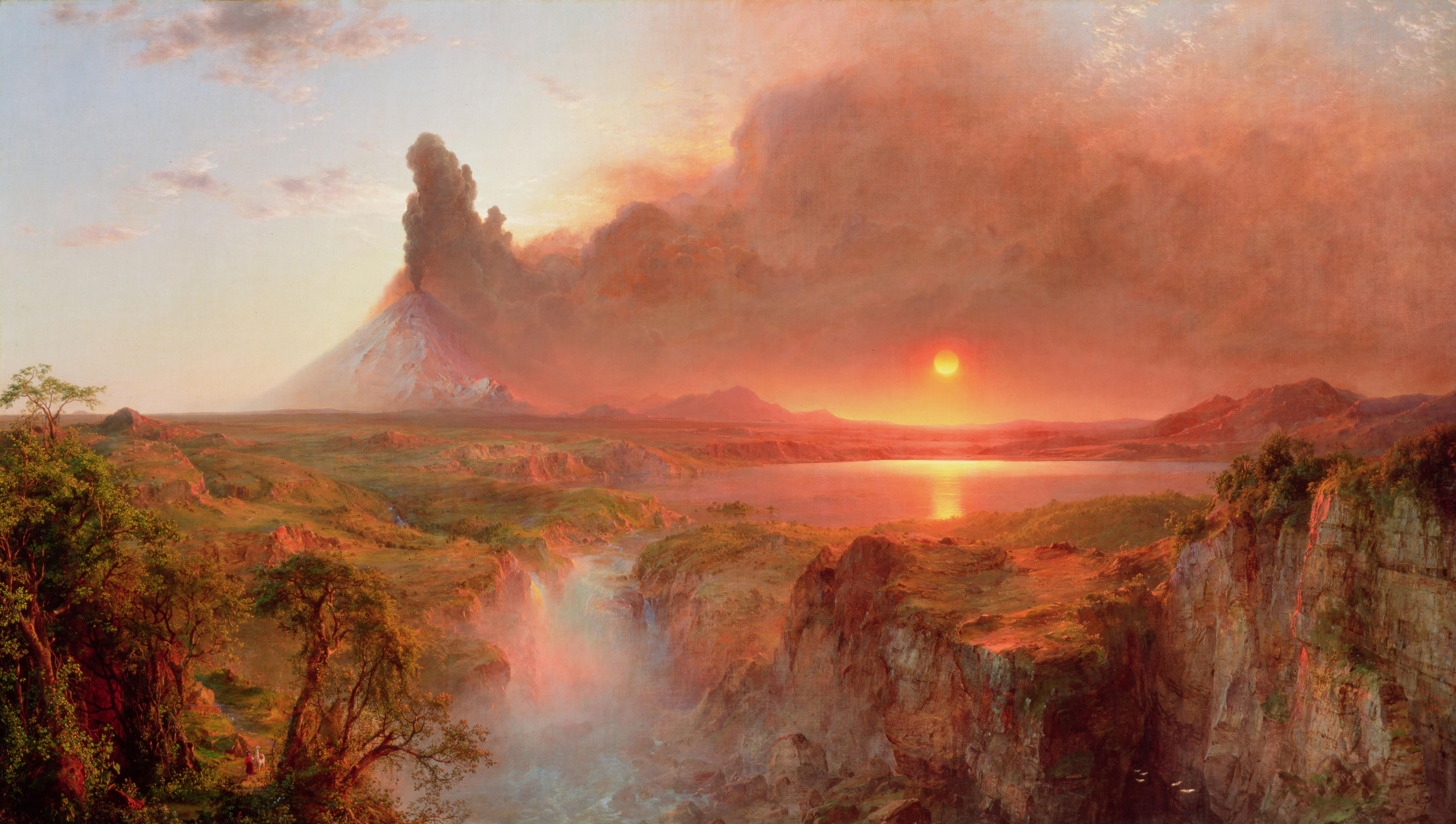
- Artist: Frederic Edwin Church
- Year: 1862
- Completion date: <
- Movement: Landscape painting
- Subject: Cotopaxi
- Dimensions: Unframed: 48 × 85 in. (121.9 × 215.9 cm), Framed: 66 5/8 in. × 103 in. × 6 1/4 in. (169.2 × 261.6 × 15.9 cm)
- Location: Detroit Institute of Arts, Detroit
- Owner: Detroit Institute of Arts

Cotopaxi is an 1862 oil painting by American artist Frederic Edwin Church, a member of the Hudson River School. The painting depicts Cotopaxi, an active volcano that is also the second highest peak in modern-day Ecuador, spewing smoke and ash across a colorful sunrise. The work was commissioned by well-known philanthropist and collector James Lenox and was first exhibited in New York City in 1863. Cotopaxi was met with great acclaim, seen by some as a "parable" of the Civil War, then raging in the American South, with its casting of light against darkness in a vast tropical landscape. Church first depicted Cotopaxi beginning in 1853 during his first of several travels to South America, forming a series of at least 10 paintings on the subject during his lifetime. Cotopaxi has been called by some art historians the "apex" of the Cotopaxi series or Church's "ultimate interpretation" of the eponymous volcano.

Cotopaxi is currently exhibited by the Detroit Institute of Arts, while other members of the series are housed in various museums and private collections, including the New Britain Museum of American Art, Smithsonian American Art Museum, Museum of Fine Arts, Houston, Art Institute of Chicago, and Yale University Art Gallery.

== Background ==
=== The Hudson River School ===
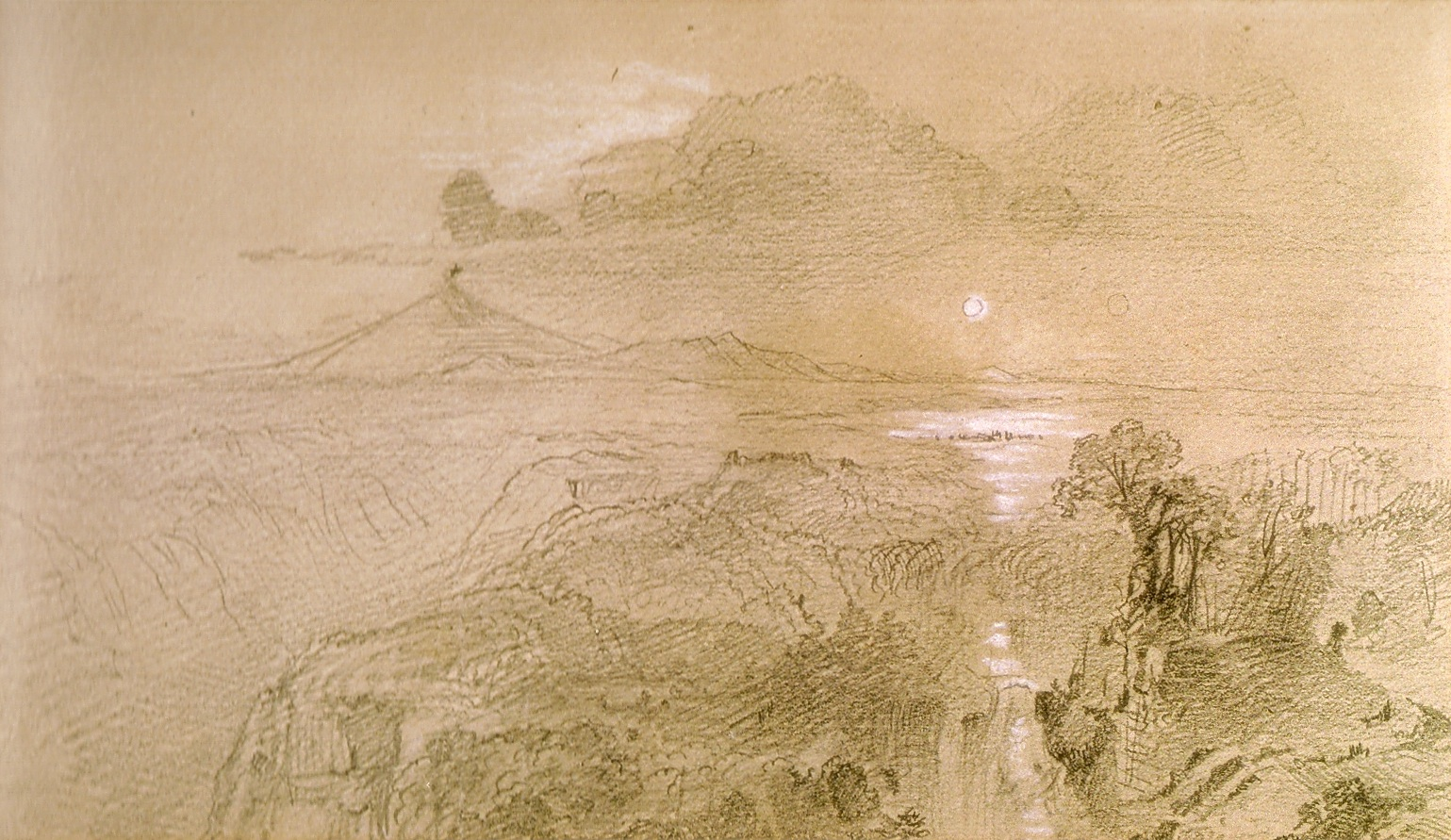
Study of Cotopaxi (1862)

Church was a member of the Hudson River School, which stressed the need to experience the natural world directly in order to depict the same subjects on canvas. Church made many preparatory sketches "on the spot" of his travels throughout South America, including of Cotopaxi, in order to produce the multiple, dramatic canvases of the subject from the 1850-1860's back in Church's New York studio.

=== J. M. W. Turner ===
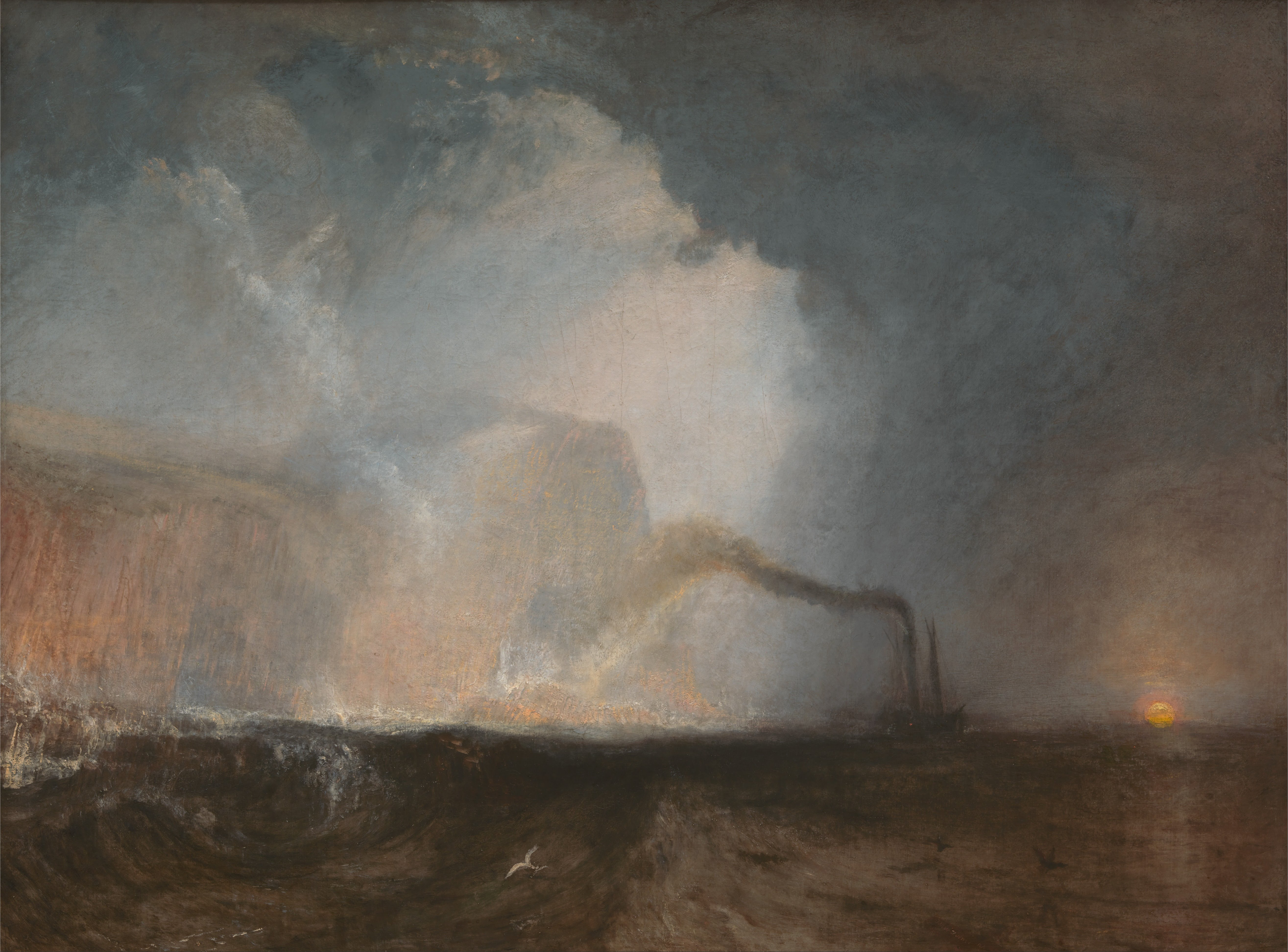
Turner's Staffa, Fingal's Cave (1832)

Cotopaxi was commissioned by James Lenox, an American philanthropist who notably owned the first paintings by English artist J. M. W. Turner to reach America; these included Staffa, Fingal's Cave (1832) & Fort Vimieux (1831). It is likely that the painterly style of Turner and his treatment of the sublime influenced Church's approach to the composition and brushstrokes used in Cotopaxi, although it is uncertain.

=== Alexander von Humboldt ===
Church's travels across South America and depiction of Cotopaxi, among other volcanoes like Chimborazo, were a direct result of his interest in the writings and illustrations of naturalist Alexander von Humboldt, who extensively catalogued the mountains and volcanoes of South America. Both Church and Humboldt over-dramatized the slopes of Cotopaxi's crater and sides, using artistic license to idealize the vantage point used by the audience to view the dynamic landscape.

== Purpose and reception ==
While Church's original interactions with Cotopaxi were heavily influenced by the writings of Humboldt and the work of his mentor, Thomas Cole (who in turn was heavily influenced by the landscape paintings of Claude Lorrain), Church came into his own by the time he produced Cotopaxi. Church envisioned multiple of his landscape paintings to form "a magnificent landscape triptic...:the 'Chimborazo' [to be] hung on the left, for its expression of the tropical witchery of landscape, the Andean beauty; and the Cotopaxi on the right, as especially representing the Andean grandeur and energy."

It is unclear if Church originally intended for Cotopaxi to comment on the ongoing Civil War. Some art historians regard Cotopaxi as an allegory for the "struggle in progress" of the Civil War in 1862. On the other hand, others describe Church's efforts as "consciously or not resonating" with an American audience at a time of the war when the Union would begin to prevail in 1863. In either case, Cotopaxi earned Church recognition for his nuanced approach to the landscape, documenting an intriguing natural phenomenon with elements of romanticism.

== Gallery ==
Additional Paintings of Cotopaxi by Church
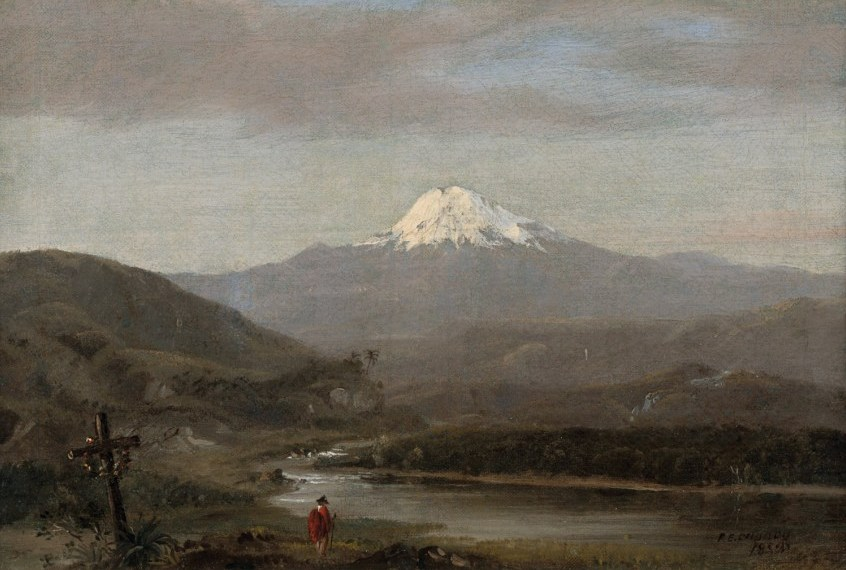
Cotopaxi, Ecuador (1853); New Britain Museum of American Art

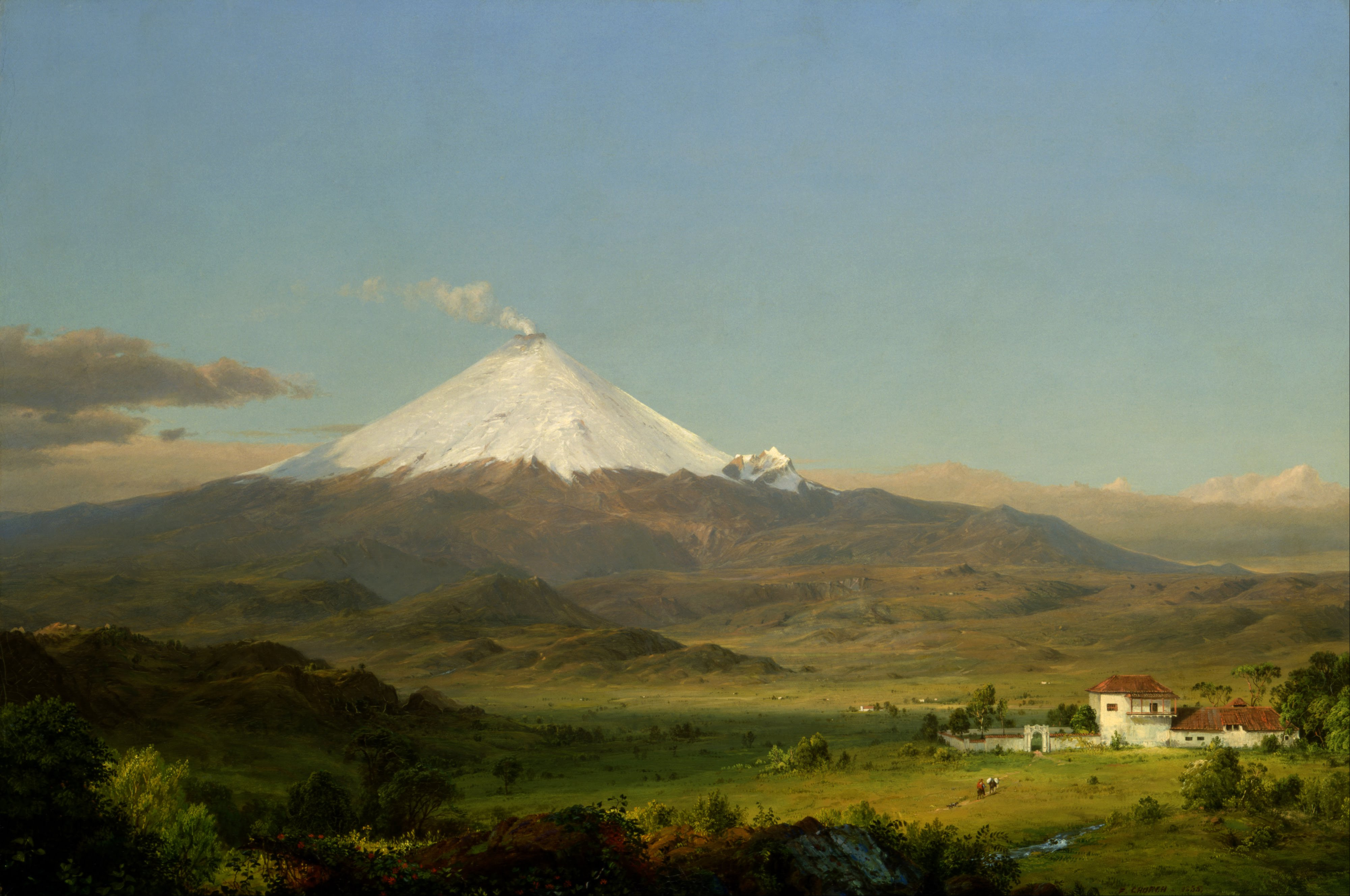
Cotopaxi (1855); Smithsonian American Art Museum

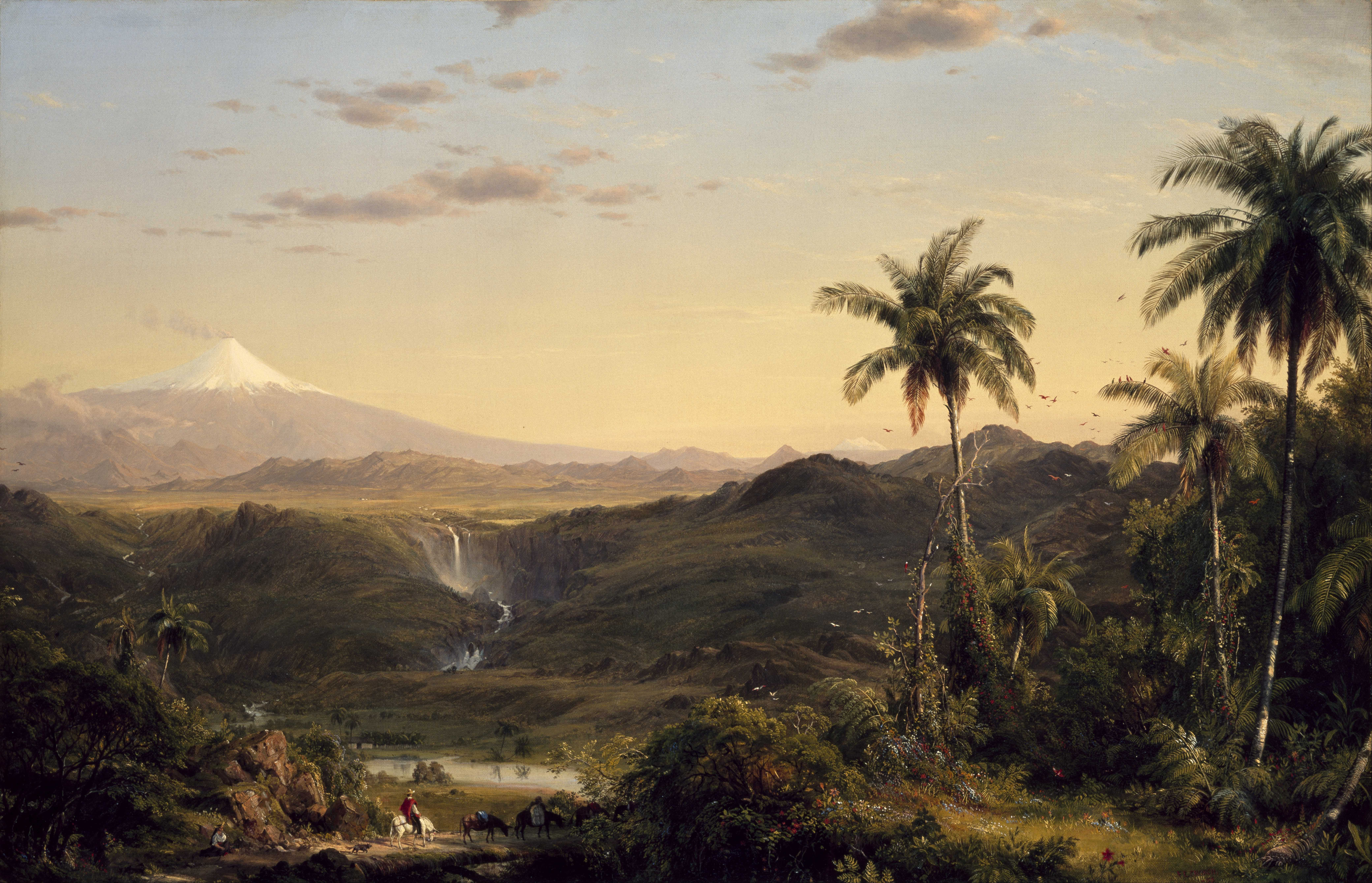
Cotopaxi (1855); Museum of Fine Arts, Houston

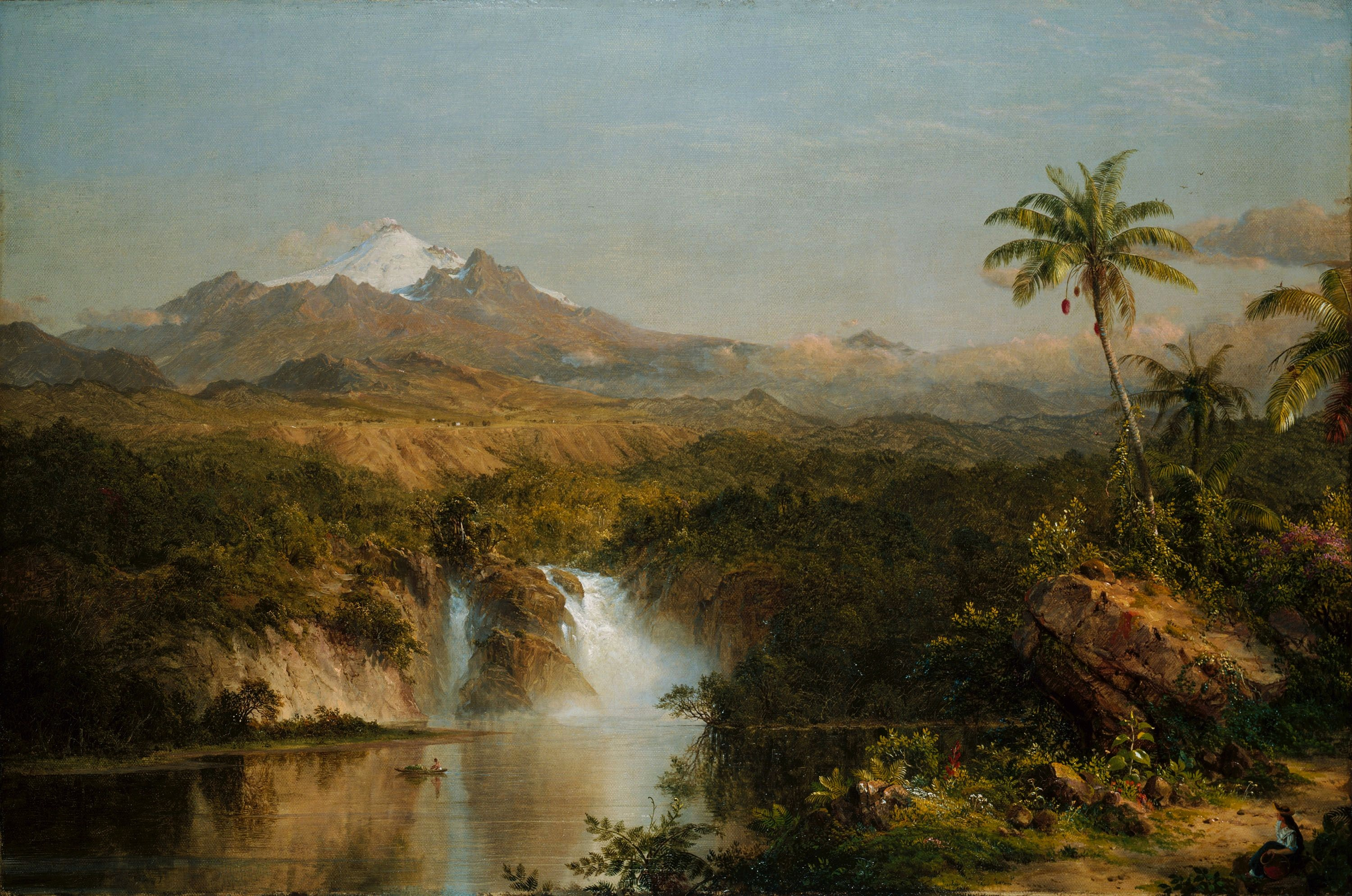
View of Cotopaxi (1857); Art Institute of Chicago

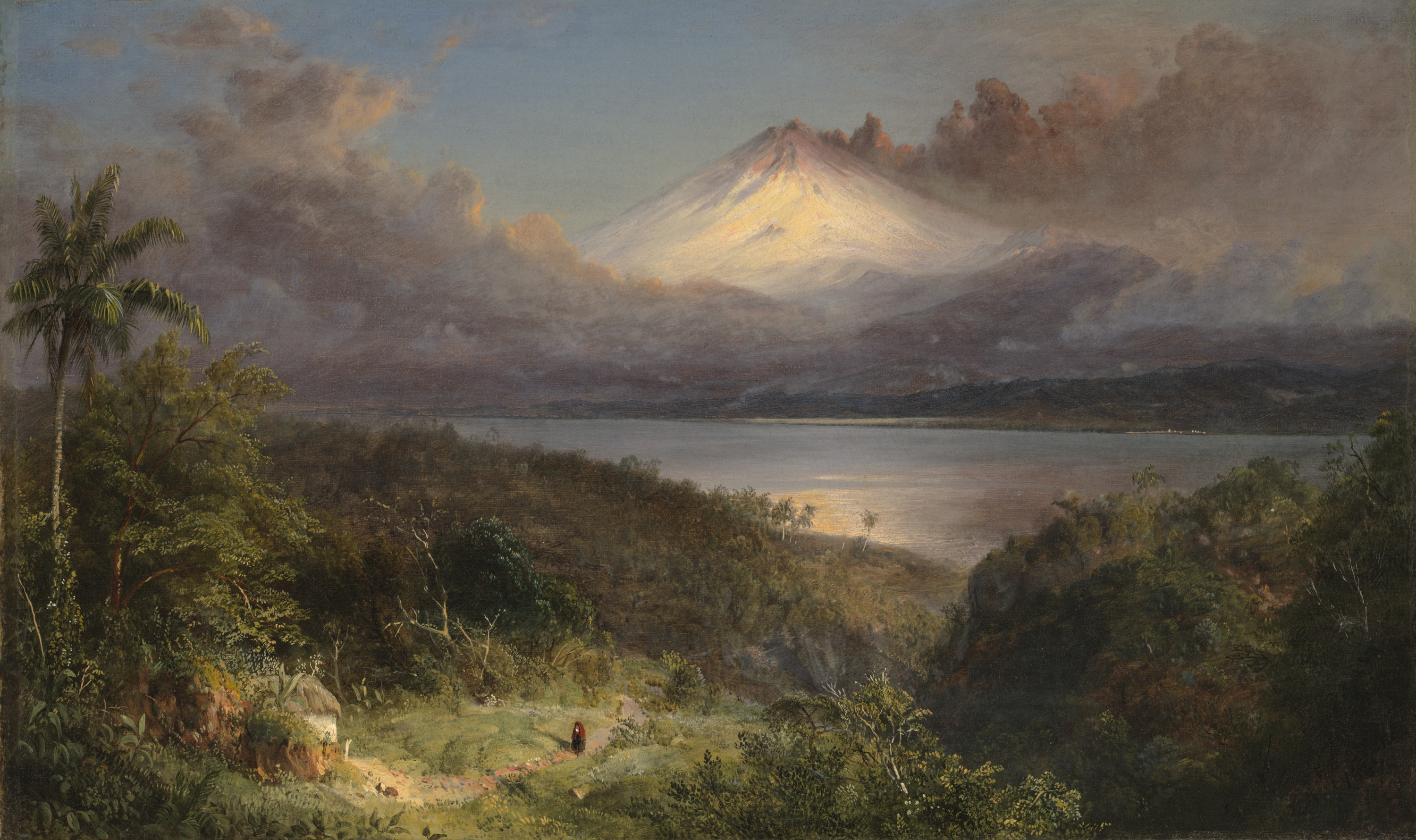
View of Cotopaxi (1867); Yale University Art Gallery

== See also ==
- List of works by Frederic Edwin Church
