= The Aegean Sea =

Painting by Frederic Edwin Church

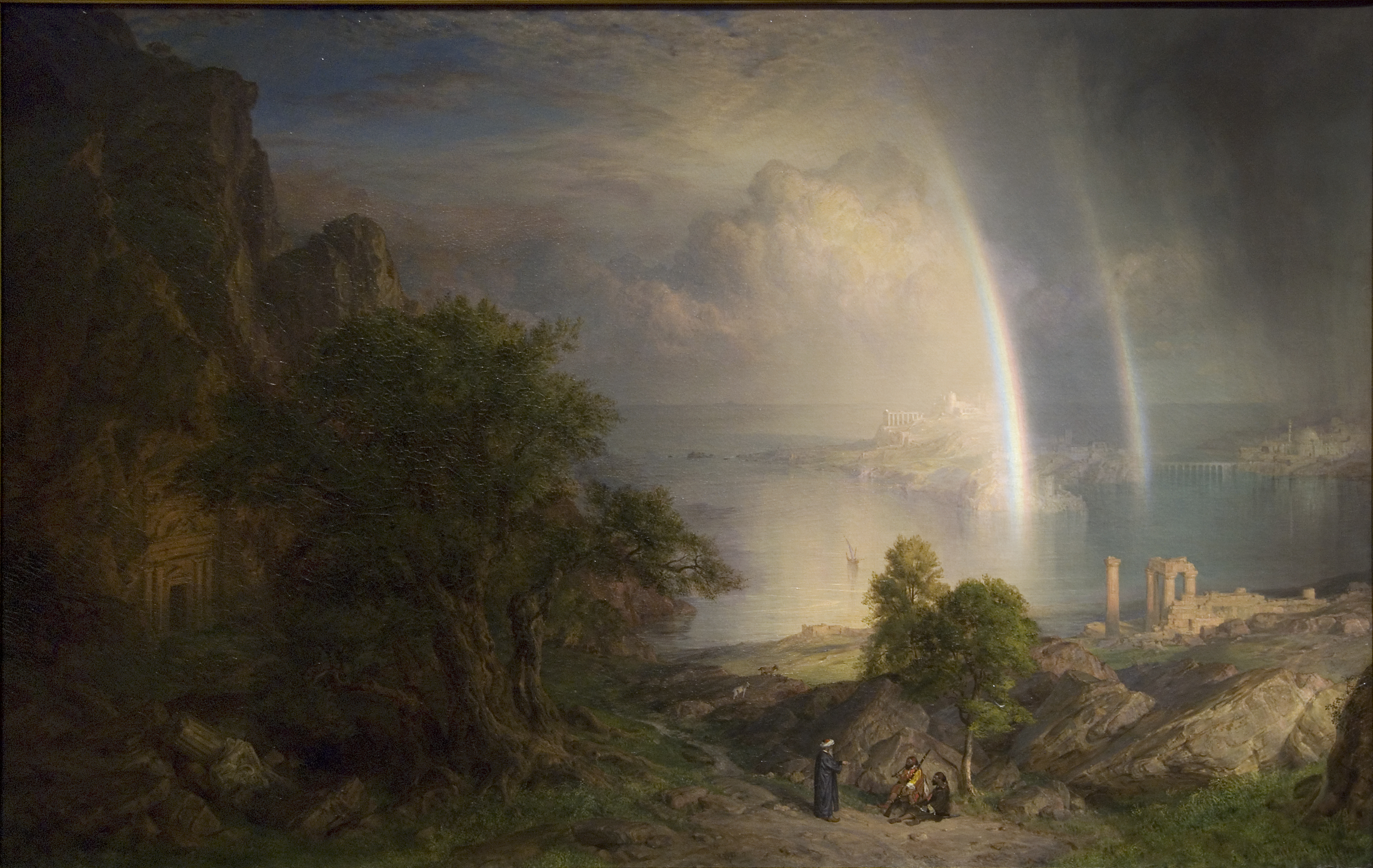
- Artist: Frederic Edwin Church
- Year: c. 1877
- Medium: Oil on canvas
- Dimensions: 137.2 cm × 214 cm (54.0 in × 84 in)
- Location: Metropolitan Museum of Art; New York City

The Aegean Sea is a c. 1877 oil painting by American artist Frederic Edwin Church, and one of his last large-scale paintings.

== Description ==
The painting measures 54 by 84.25 inches (137.2 cm × 214.0 cm). It is a capriccio inspired by Church's travels to Europe and the Middle East from 1867 to 1869. The composite image includes elements from sketches that Church made in different locations, including a rock-cut entrance from Petra in a cliff to the left, fallen capitals from the Temple of Bacchus at Baalbek in the lower left, Roman columns from Syria to the right, and in the distance across a body of water lie classical ruins that resemble the Acropolis of Athens or the Temple of Apollo in Ancient Corinth, and the dome and minaret of a mosque from Istanbul. In the foreground are three small human figures in conversation beside a road based on an oil study of three Bedouins. The cloudy sky is enlivened by a double rainbow.

In this work, Church moved away from his usual naturalistic style to a more idealised style. The atmospheric effects that may be inspired by the paintings of J. M. W. Turner which Church had seen in London (although Church had already used a double rainbow in his 1866 painting Rainy Season in the Tropics). The work may also take inspiration from Turner's 1826 view of the Roman Forum. Church designed a gilded frame for the painting, decorated with an eclectic mixture of Middle Eastern motifs, including stars and rosettes, and egg-and-dart and other moldings.

== History ==
The painting was bought by the railway tycoon William H. Osborn, a close friend and supporter of Church, and bequeathed to the Metropolitan Museum of Art on the death of his wife Virginia Reed (Sturges) Osborn in 1902.

== See also ==
- List of paintings by Frederic Edwin Church
