= Niagara Falls, from the American Side =

Painting by Frederic Edwin Church

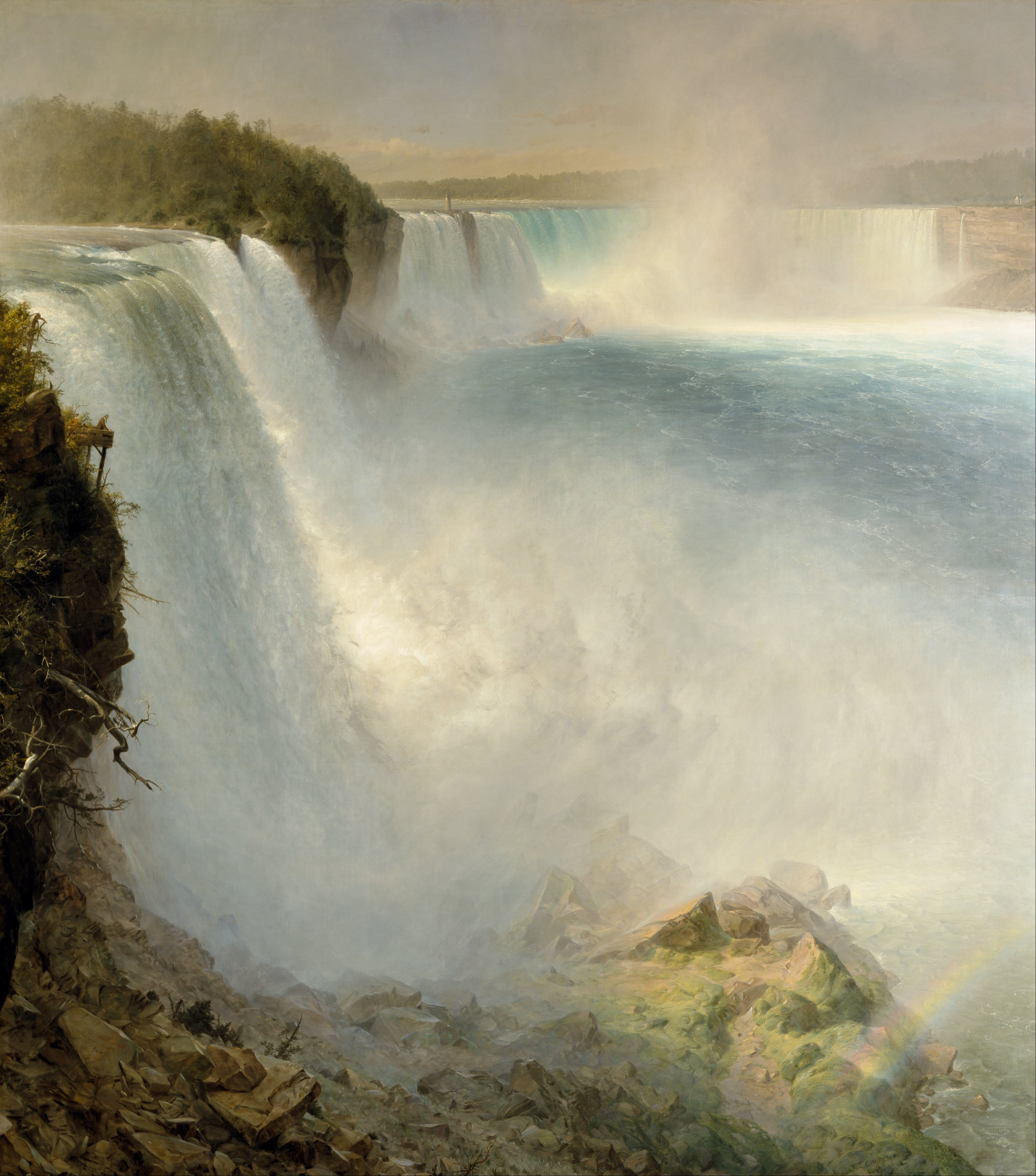
- Artist: Frederic Edwin Church
- Year: 1867
- Medium: oil on canvas
- Dimensions: 257 cm × 227 cm (101 in × 89 in)
- Location: Scottish National Gallery; Edinburgh

Niagara Falls, from the American Side is a painting by the American artist Frederic Edwin Church (1826–1900). Completed in 1867, it is based on preliminary sketches made by the artist at Niagara Falls and on a sepia photograph. It is Church's largest painting. The painting is now in the collection of the Scottish National Gallery. Church was a leading member of the Hudson River School of painters.

== Painting ==
The painting depicts the view from the east side of Niagara Falls – the American side. A rainbow is visible in the spray of the waterfall in the lower right of the canvas. The painting has been described as giving the impression of the water being in constant motion, rushing down, roaring.

== History ==
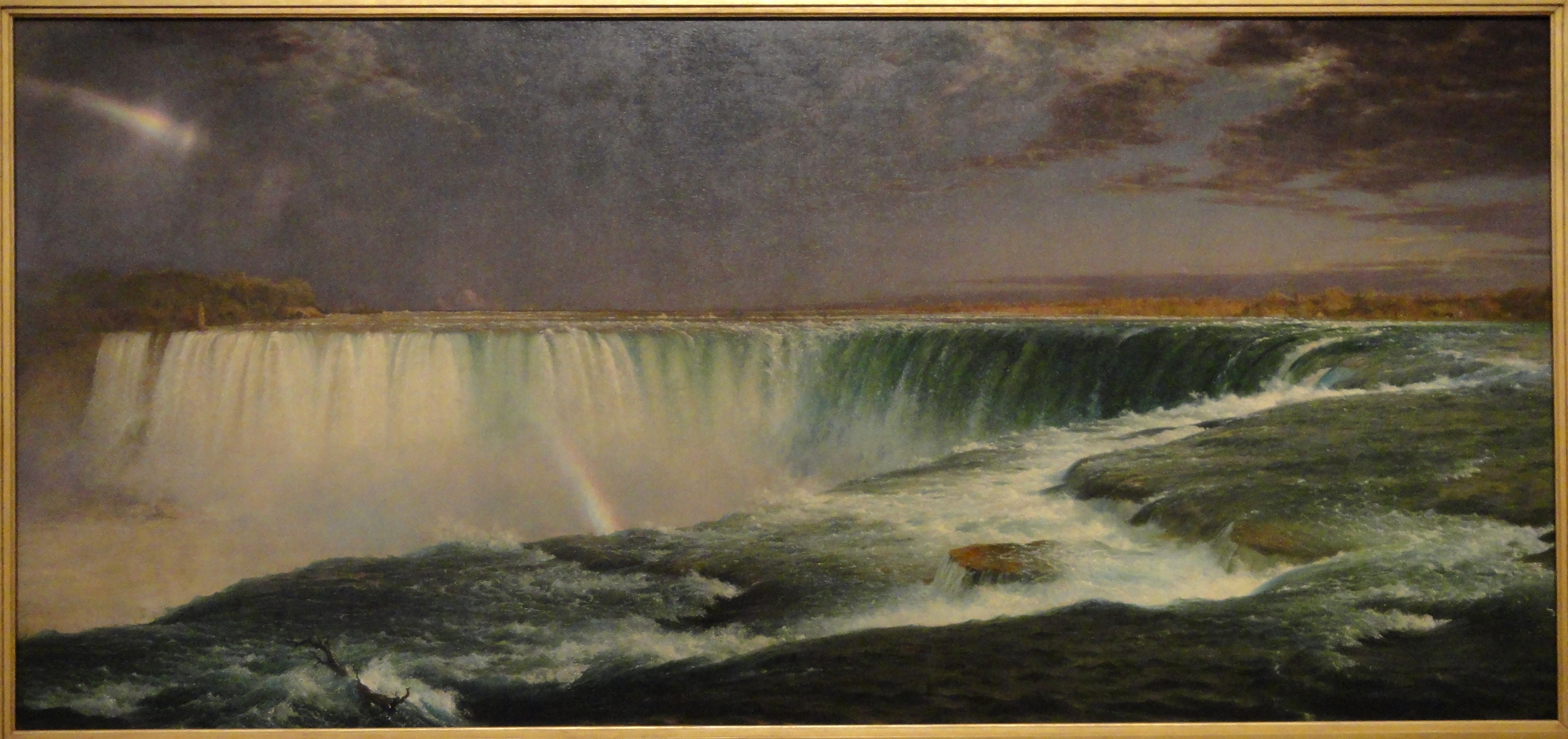
Niagara, 1857. Oil on canvas, 102 × 230 cm. Corcoran collection, National Gallery of Art, Washington

Church made his first painting of the falls in 1857. He had visited the falls several times in July and late August the previous year, making a number of pencil and oil sketches from different points of view. He elected to paint the scene from the Canadian side, choosing unconventional dimensions for the painting that emphasized the panoramic effect.

This first painting was an immediate success, attracting over 100,000 visitors within the first fortnight of its premiere at a New York gallery. Following this, it was exhibited at major cities on the Eastern seaboard, toured Britain twice and was selected for the 1867 Exposition Universelle in Paris. It was purchased by the recently founded Corcoran Gallery of Art in 1876, cementing that institution's success. When the Corcoran closed in 2014, its collection was gifted to the National Gallery of Art, Washington, D.C.

Niagara Falls, from the American Side was commissioned from Church by the American art dealer Michael Knoedler in 1866. It was the third painting of the series and may have been originally destined for the Exposition. Like many of Church's works of the 1850s and 1860s, it was exhibited in New York City, and then sent to London, where a chromolithograph was made. In 1887 the painting was purchased by John S. Kennedy, who gifted it to his homeland of Scotland. Niagara Falls, from the American Side is the only major work by Frederic Edwin Church which is in a public collection in Europe.

== Style ==
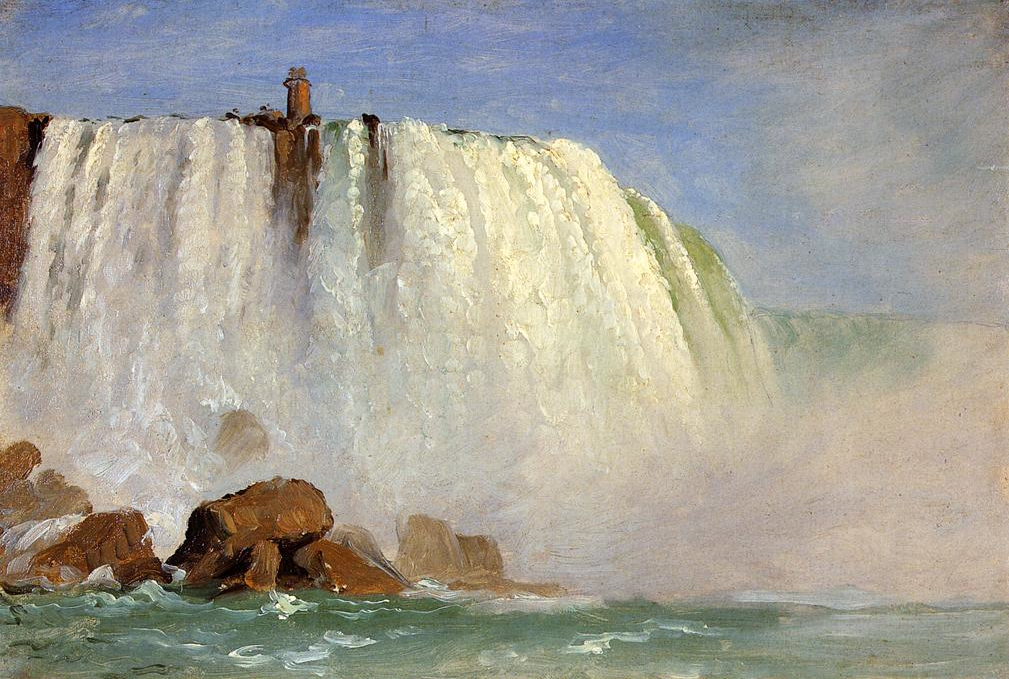
One of the studies of the Niagara falls

The canvas is painted in the Romantic style and captures the aesthetic principles of the sublime and the picturesque. Church was a member of the Hudson River School, a group of landscape artists, whose aesthetic vision was influenced by romanticism. The Romantic movement validated intense emotions. The movement was placing new emphasis on the sentiments of visionary and transcendental experience. Emotions like awe – especially that which is experienced in confronting the sublimity of untamed nature and its picturesque qualities – were now entirely new aesthetic categories, and very different from art styles of the same era – the unemotional Realism and of the calm, balanced Classicism – as a source of aesthetic experience.

The Sublime view of nature was as something of a large scale dramatic subject, an expression of the sublime – defined by Edmund Burke as the strongest emotion that can be felt.

== See also ==
- List of paintings by Frederic Edwin Church
- An East View of the Great Cataract of Niagara, 1762 painting
