= An East View of the Great Cataract of Niagara =

1762 painting by Thomas Davies

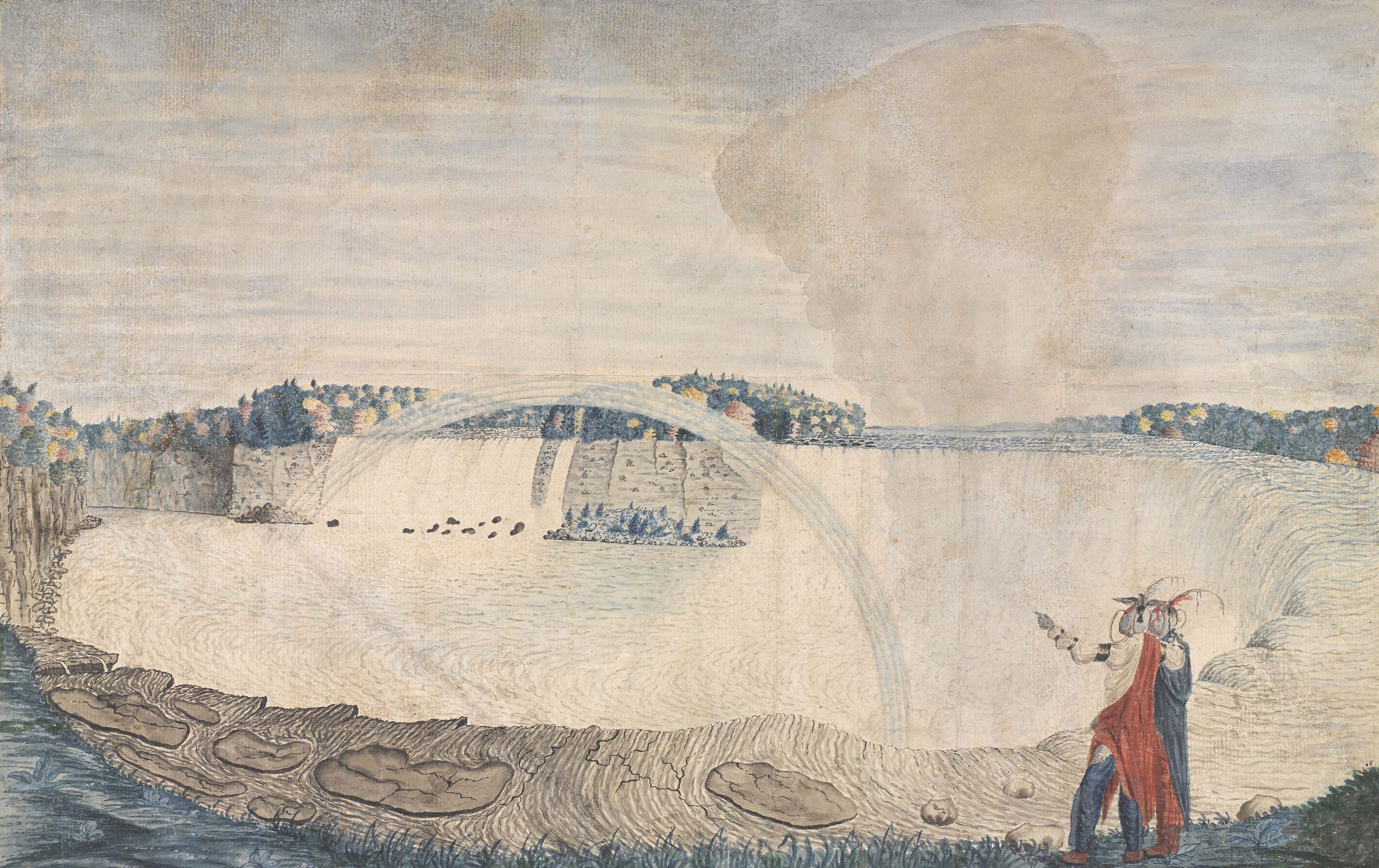
- Artist: Thomas Davies
- Year: 1762
- Type: Watercolour
- Dimensions: 34.3 cm × 50.2 cm (13 1/2 in × 19 3/4 in)
- Location: Private collection

An East View of the Great Cataract of Niagara is a historic watercolour of Niagara Falls painted on site by Thomas Davies (c. 1737–1812) in 1762. It was the first eyewitness painting and the first accurate view of the falls.

== History ==
Thomas Davies was a British Army officer in the Royal Artillery and received training in topographic drawing at the Royal Military Academy, Woolwich. During the French and Indian War, he served under General Jeffery Amherst. After the attack against Montreal, he surveyed the surrounding region from 1760 to 1766 and painted six waterfalls, including this one of Niagara Falls.

Niagara Falls was first described in the journals of Samuel de Champlain in 1604. The first published eyewitness description was by Louis Hennepin in Description of Louisiana (1683). His later work, A New Discovery of a Vast Country (1697), included the first image of the falls based on his description and not done on site.

Davies later painted two additional views of the falls c. 1766. His work was not well known until after a 1953 auction from the Earl of Derby's library. These paintings were then shown as part of a major exhibition devoted to Davies, 2 July – 4 September 1972, at the National Gallery of Canada.

On 1 April 2015, it was sold for £146,500 ($217,260) at Christie's in London from the Winkworth Collection. A print of the engraving of this painting by Fougeron was sold for £3,750 ($5,561). On 19 August 2015, a temporary export bar was placed on the painting in an effort to keep it in the United Kingdom.

== Description ==
The view is of Horseshoe Falls from the Canadian bank. The painting shows a rainbow emerging from the mist, while two Iroquois watch on the right. The landscape has red and orange colours as the forest leaves change from green in the fall.

== Inscription ==
Davies inscribed scientific notes about the falls and the landscape at the bottom of the work:

Done on the Spot by Thomas Davies Capt Royal Artillery
The Perpendicular height of the Fall 162 feet Breadth about a Mile & Quarter
The Variety of Colours in the Woods shews the true Nature of the Country

== Other versions ==
J. Fougeron produced a handcoloured engraving of this work, published in Davies's Six Views of North American Waterfalls (c. 1763–1768). Davies later painted Niagara Falls from Above (c. 1766) and Niagara Falls from Below (c. 1766) showing the falls from different perspectives. These two are now in the collection of the New-York Historical Society.

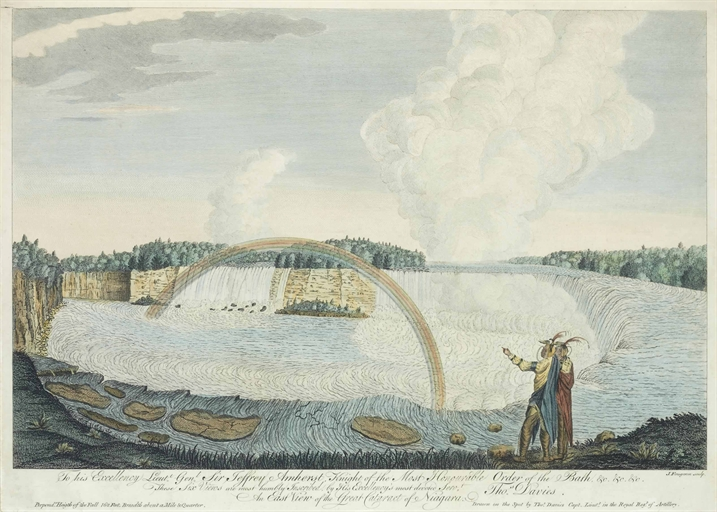
An East View of the Great Cataract of Niagara (c. 1763–1768) – Engraving by J. Fougeron

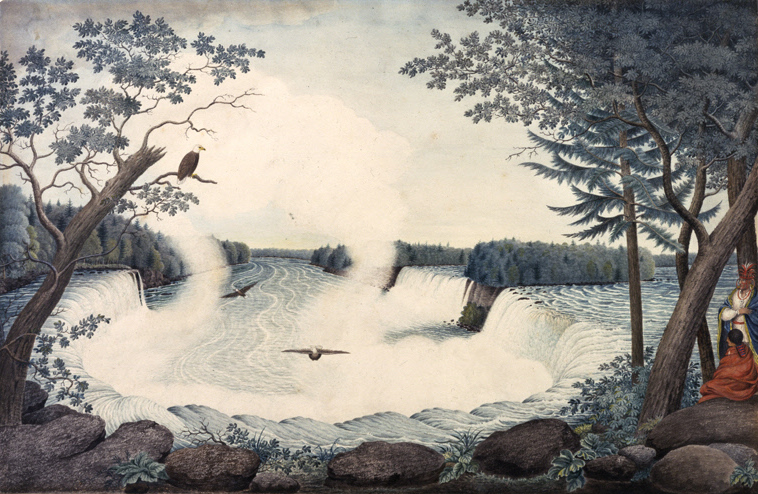
Niagara Falls from Above (c. 1766)

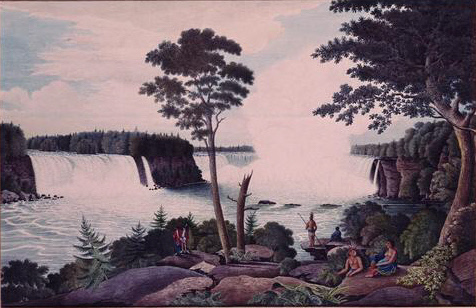
Niagara Falls from Below (c. 1766)

== See also ==
- Niagara, 1857 painting
- Niagara Falls, from the American Side, 1867 painting

== Bibliography ==
- Dickenson, Victoria (1998). Drawn from Life: Science and Art in the Portrayal of the New World. University of Toronto Press. ISBN 978-08020-8073-8.
- Dow, Charles Mason (1921). Anthology and Bibliography of Niagara Falls. J.B. Lyon Company, Printers.
- Hubbard, R. H. (1972). Thomas Davies, c. 1737–1812. Ottawa: National Gallery of Canada.
