= Terrapin Point =

Observation area in Niagara Falls, New York

Coordinates: 43.080069°N 79.074403°W

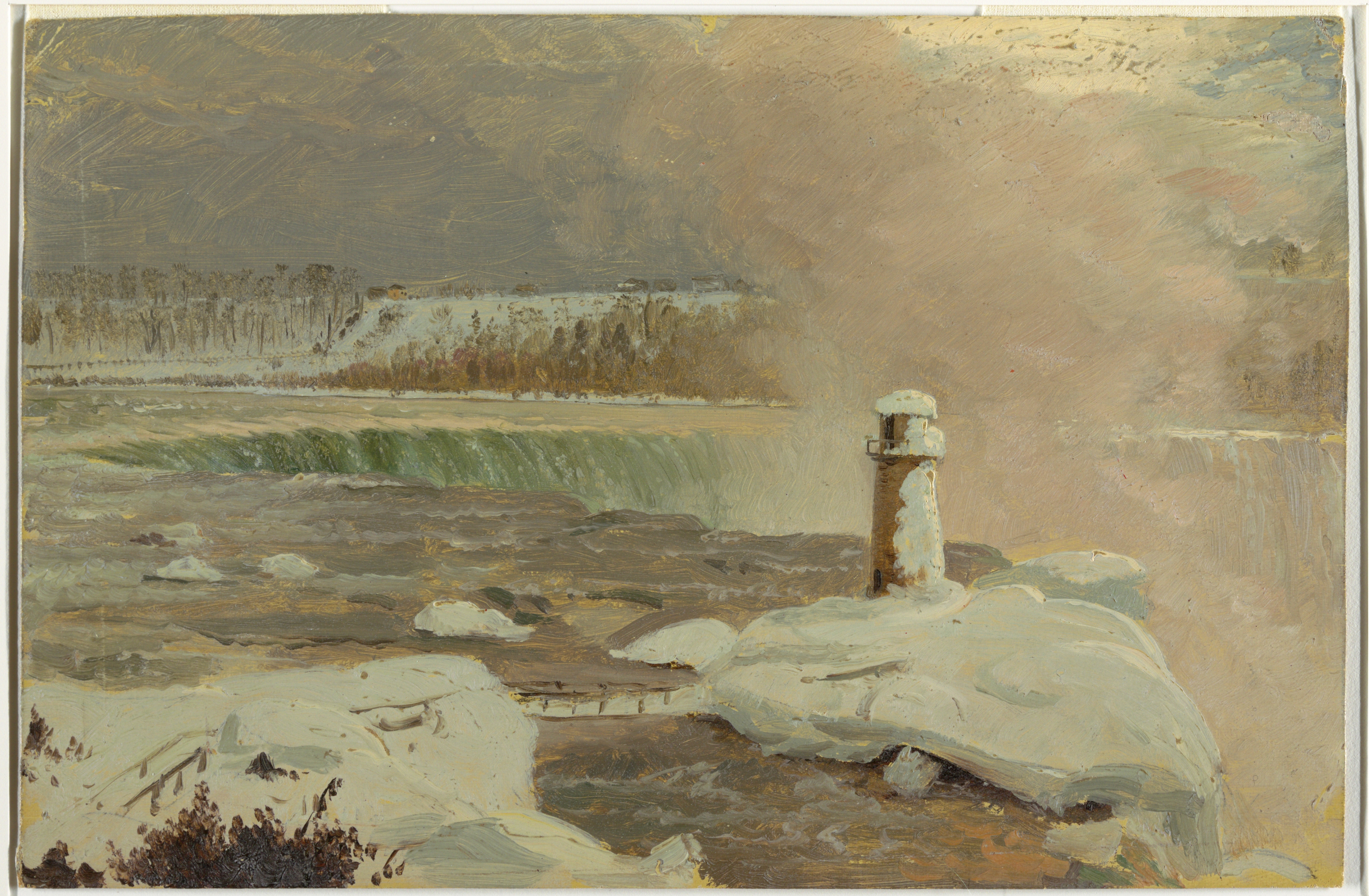
Frederic Edwin Church's Drawing, Niagara River and Falls in Snow, March 1856 shows the former boardwalk and Terrapin Tower

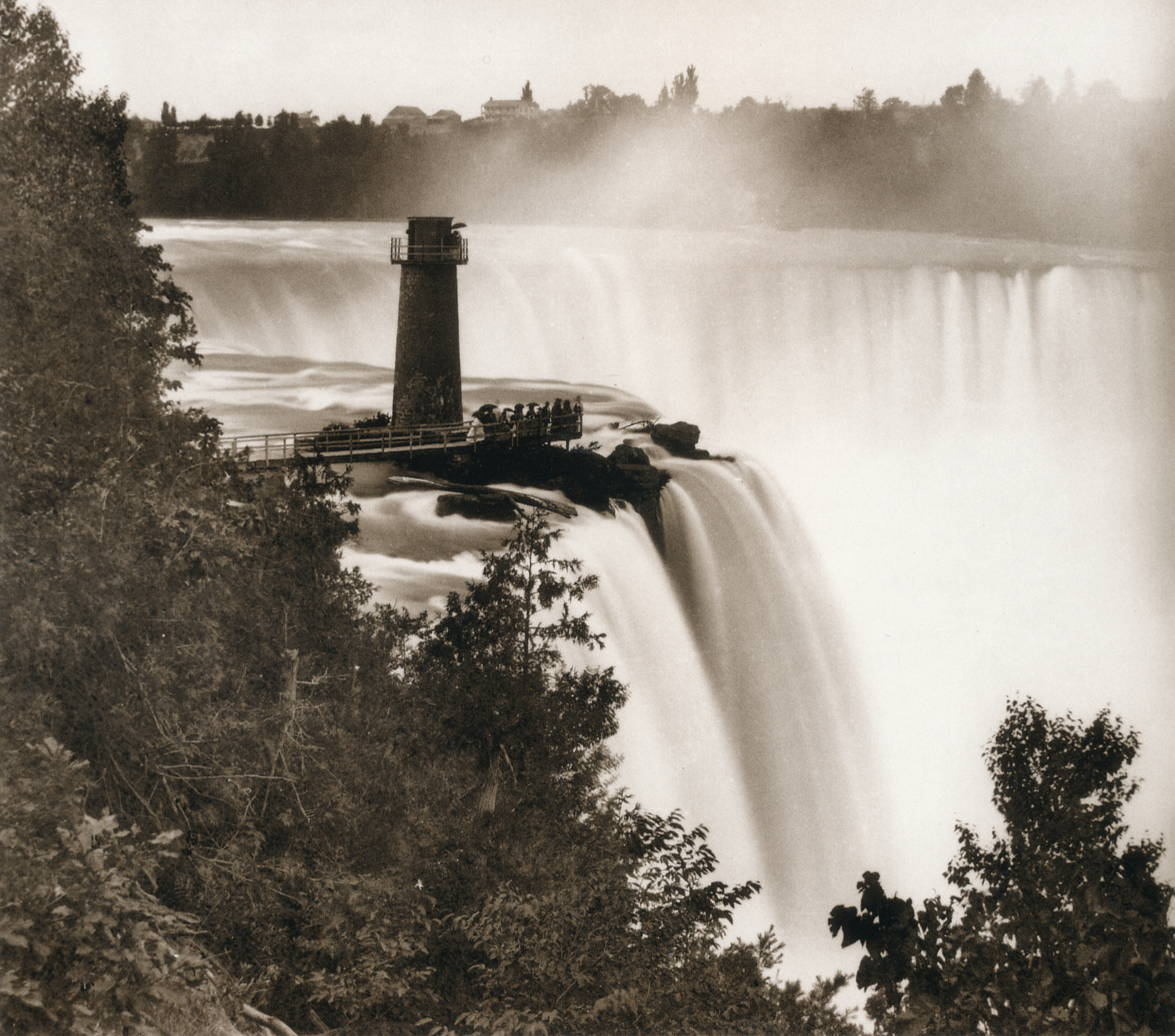
Terrapin Point with Terrapin Tower (1859)

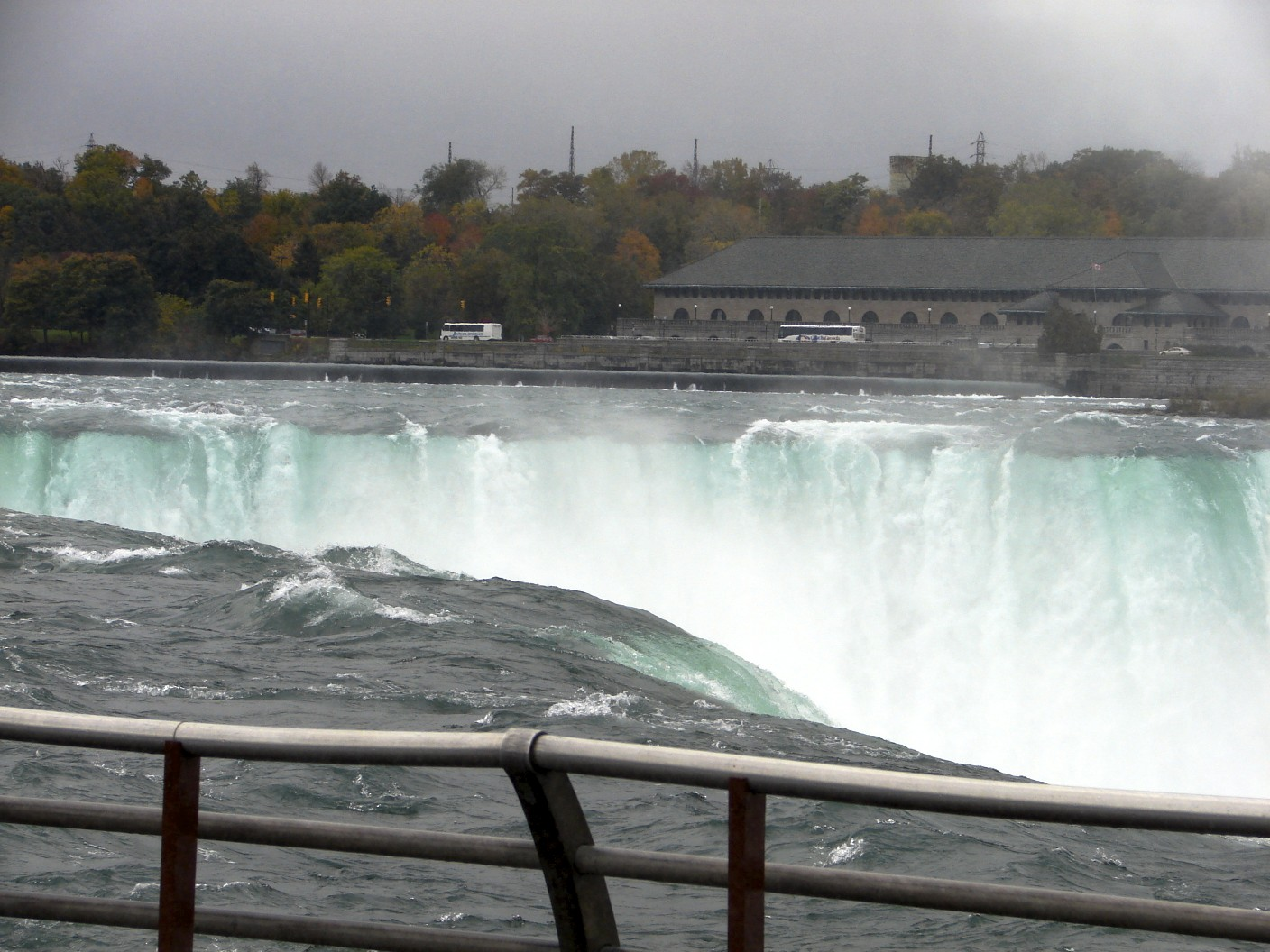
Horseshoe Falls seen from Terrapin Point

Terrapin Point (formerly Terrapin Rocks) is an observation area located in Niagara Falls, New York at the western tip of Goat Island, next to the Canadian Horseshoe Falls. It is one of two major observation areas overlooking the falls and lower Niagara Gorge on the New York side, the other being Prospect Point further downriver.

Before the second half of the 20th century Terrapin Point was a group of rocks on the brink of the falls, disconnected from Goat Island. They were known as the Terrapin Rocks because they resembled giant tortoises.

In 1827 the then owners of the land on the American side, brothers Peter and Augustes Porter, built a 300-foot wooden bridge from Goat Island to just off the edge of the falls. In 1833 they added a lighthouse-like building, Terrapin Tower. Its height is estimated at 30 to 45 feet, its diameter at 12 feet. A spiral staircase inside allowed visitors to reach a viewing platform. The tower quickly attracted many visitors, and some critics said that it disturbed the beauty of the waterfalls. In 1873 the Porter brothers blew up the tower. The bridge can be seen in photos from 1934; by 1954 it had also disappeared.

During the dredging of the upper Niagara River in 1954–1955 to spread the flow of water more evenly along the crest of the Horseshoe Falls, dirt and fill from the dredging was taken to Terrapin Point increasing its area and affording visitors views of the waterfall not seen before. The Terrapin Point fill area was turned over to the New York State Division of Parks on 3 November 1955. However, this area was closed to tourists after 1969, due to cracks being found in the rock foundation. In 1983 the United States Army Corps of Engineers blasted away 25,000 tons of unstable rock, added more landfill, and built diversion dams and retaining walls to force the water away from Terrapin Point. 400 feet (120 m) of the Horseshoe Falls was eliminated, including 100 feet (30 m) on the Canadian side. According to author Ginger Strand, the Horseshoe Falls is now entirely in Canada. Other sources say "most of" Horseshoe Falls is in Canada. The remaining surface was scaled, and reopened to tourists in September 1983.

In June 2012 Nik Wallenda became the first person to walk a high-wire directly over the brink of the falls, beginning his walk off Terrapin Point.
