= The Icebergs =

Painting by Frederic Edwin Church

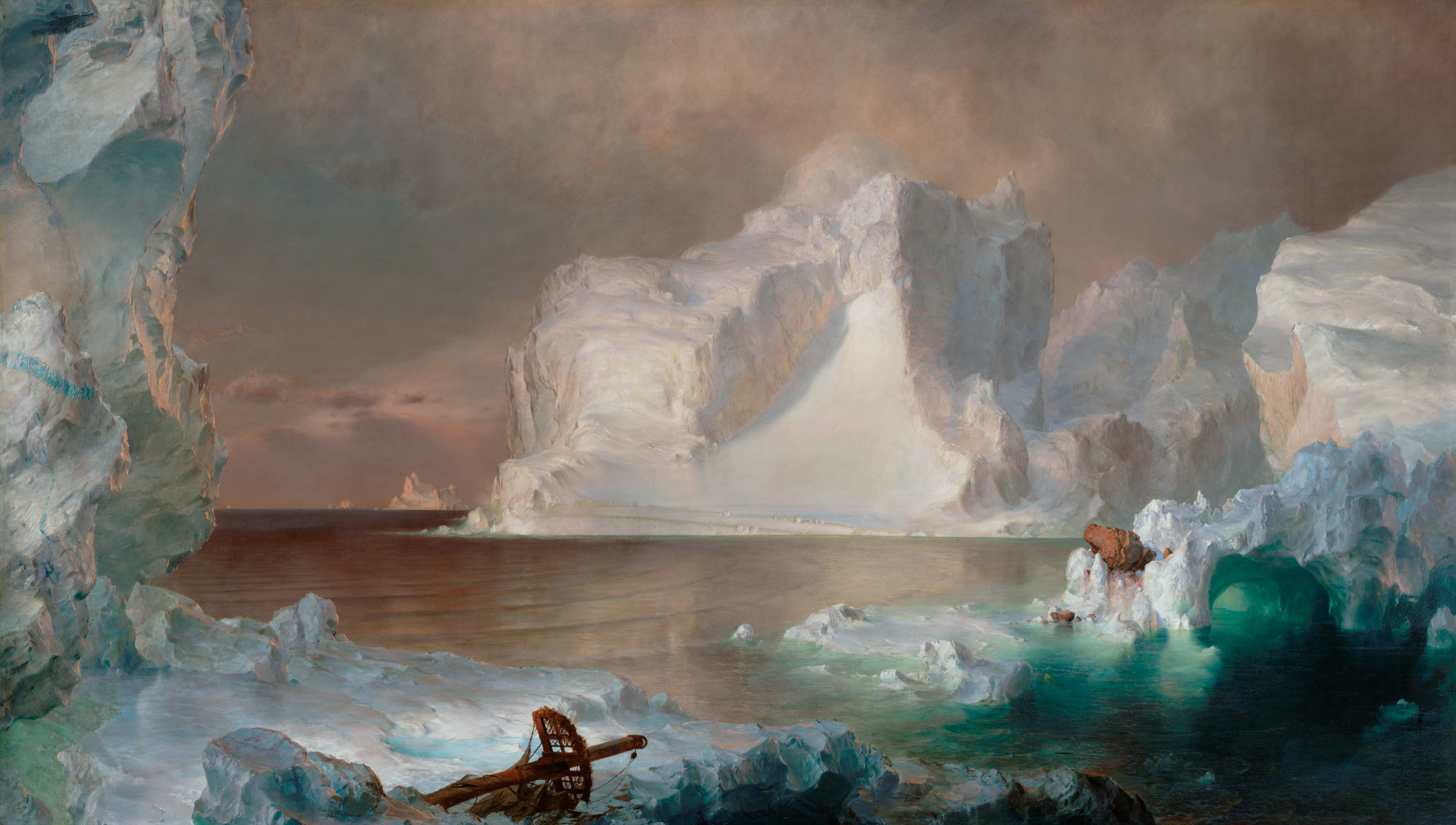
- Artist: Frederic Edwin Church
- Year: 1861
- Medium: Oil on canvas
- Dimensions: 1.64 m × 2.85 m (5.4 ft × 9.4 ft)
- Location: Dallas Museum of Art, Dallas, Texas, US
- Website: Dallas Museum of Art

The Icebergs is an 1861 oil painting by the American landscape artist Frederic Edwin Church. It was inspired by his 1859 voyage to the North Atlantic around Newfoundland and Labrador. Considered one of Church's "Great Pictures"—measuring 1.64 by 2.85 metres (5.4 by 9.4 feet)—the painting depicts one or more icebergs in the afternoon light of the Arctic. It was first displayed in New York City in 1861, where visitors paid 25 cents' admittance to the one-painting show. Similar exhibitions in Boston and London followed. The unconventional landscape of ice, water, and sky generally drew praise, but the American Civil War, which began the same year, lessened critical and popular interest in New York City's cultural events.

The painting became popular within Church's oeuvre and inspired other landscape artists' interest in the Arctic, but its apparent lack of narrative or allegory perplexed some viewers. Between exhibitions in the US and England, Church added the ship mast to the painting, and retitled the work from its original The North. He eventually sold the painting in England, where it disappeared from the art-world's awareness after the buyer's death in 1901. In 1979, the painting, which a number of New York City galleries were now hunting, was rediscovered in a home in Manchester, England, where it had remained for most of the intervening 78 years. It was soon put to auction in New York City, drawing significant interest as its sale coincided with renewed critical interest in Church, who had been largely forgotten in the 20th century. The Icebergs was auctioned for US$2.5 million, the most of any American painting to that point. The buyers, later identified as businessman Lamar Hunt and his wife Norma, donated the canvas to the Dallas Museum of Art, where it remains today.

== Background ==
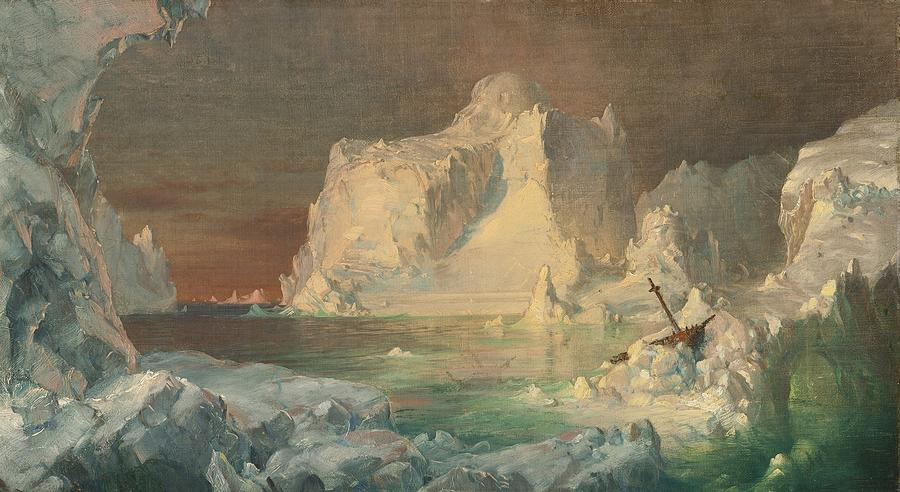
In Church's final study for the painting, a stranded ship at right appears in place of the boulder. In the original version of the finished painting, no portion of a ship appeared at all—reducing the narrative possibilities of the picture—but Church later added the ship mast to the finished painting. (Note: In December 2013 the study, which measures 10 x 18 1/8 inches, was auctioned by Sotheby's New York for $905,000.)

Church painted The Icebergs at a time of general interest in Arctic exploration. The disappearance of the expedition of British explorer John Franklin, who had planned to navigate the Northwest Passage, was a popular press topic in the 1850s. In 1856 the American explorer Elisha Kane published an account of his own expedition to determine Franklin's fate. Francis Leopold McClintock finally uncovered the fate of Franklin and his crew, which he described in an 1859 book. Church too was interested in the Arctic, and in science and geography. He was a member of the American Geographical and Statistical Society, where the Arctic explorer Isaac Israel Hayes had lectured, and in 1859 he journeyed to the Arctic himself. Hayes, a friend of Church, named an Arctic peak at the Kennedy Channel after Church in the summer of 1861. (Note: Church's Peak is still so-named and has an elevation of 2,540 feet (770 m). Its coordinates are 81°16′N 65°35′W.) As Church scholar David C. Huntington wrote, "By going north in 1859 Church was both following and leading the public mind.... Church had a democratic genius for embodying the archetype of the immediate and immediately present. His artistic hand responded to the moment's aggregate curiosity."

In June 1859, Church and his friend the writer Louis Legrand Noble took a steamship from Halifax, Nova Scotia to St. John's, Newfoundland and Labrador. For about a month they traveled in the area of Cape Race and along the Avalon Peninsula. They chartered a schooner to approach the sea ice, and Church used a rowboat to get close to the icebergs, making sketches in pencil and oil while enduring sea-sickness. He produced about one hundred sketches, ranging from small pencil drawings to atmospheric oil studies. Returning to New York, he painted Twilight in the Wilderness (1860) before committing to The Icebergs, which took about six months, in the winter of 1860. Church was then at the height of his fame, and newspapers regularly updated the public on the progress of the painting. Noble documented their voyage in his book After Icebergs with a Painter, which was published to coincide with the exhibition of The Icebergs.

Church produced a number of advanced studies as he searched for the most favorable composition, relying on intuition. A landscape depicting just ice, water, and sky was unconventional and its composition a "hazardous experiment", according to his contemporary, the writer Henry Tuckerman, with "little scope for general effect". Church told his agent that he was pleased with the canvas as he neared completion.

Shortly before the first exhibition, the American Civil War began. Church decided to call the painting The North, a title with a double meaning: a picture of the Arctic and a patriotic reference to the northern Union. Advertisements for the exhibition noted that the admission proceeds would be donated to the Patriotic Fund, which supported Union soldiers' families.

== Description ==
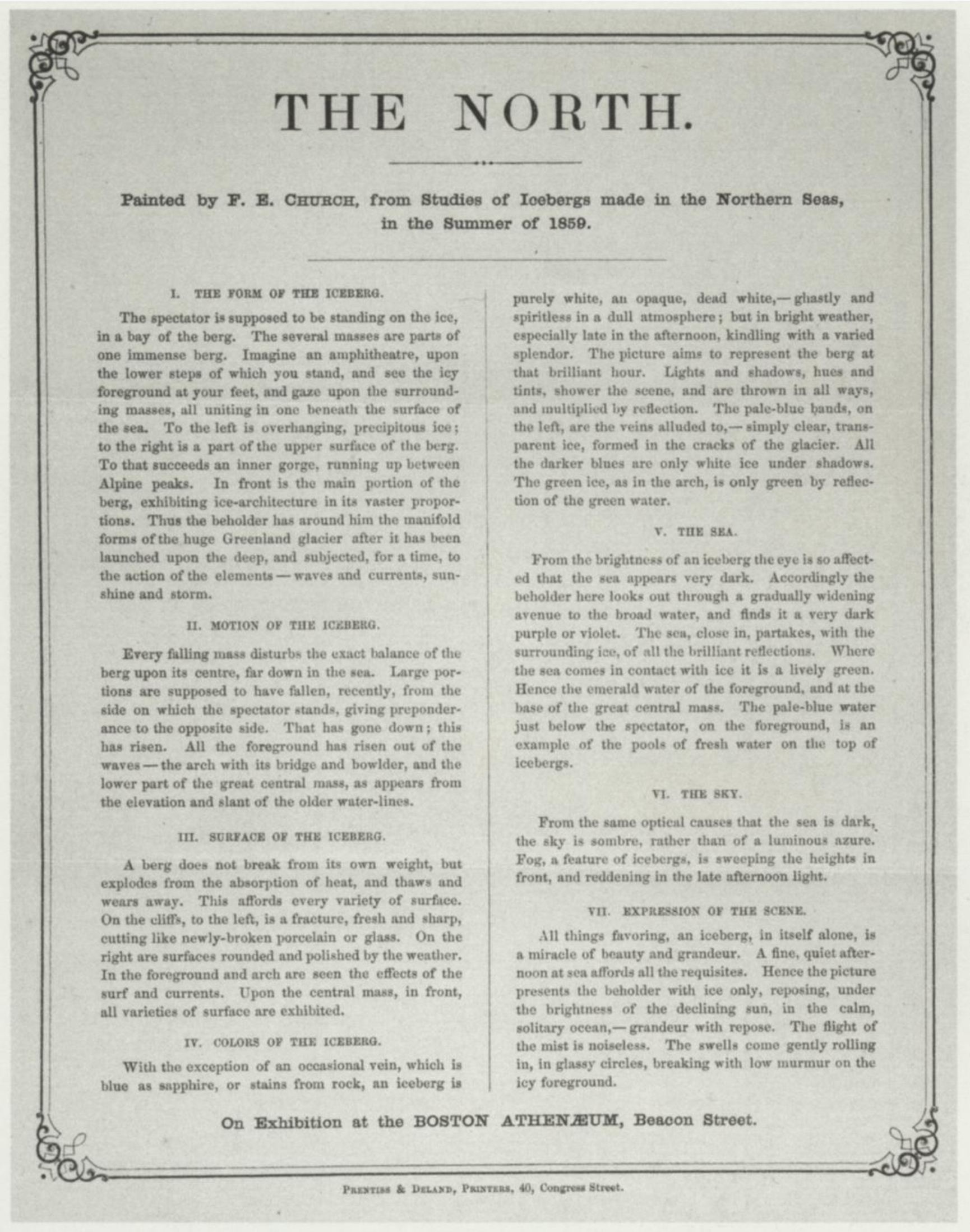
Broadside for The North, Boston, 1862

The painting is one of Church's composite views, like his popular The Heart of the Andes (1859), in which he combined elements from many sketches with his imagination to convey the essential character of the setting. This approach to landscape painting accorded with the ideas of his aesthetic influences: Alexander von Humboldt, the popular naturalist and science writer who devoted a section of his Kosmos to landscape art; and John Ruskin, the famous English art critic. Church's particular challenge was to produce a grand landscape painting of an environment so limited in form, color, and living things. As the American art historian Gerald L. Carr writes, "By standards of its day, the composition was virtually abstract. Much was left to the imagination."

A broadside was prepared to orient exhibition visitors to the painting. It described the scene in largely objective terms. Given its lack of figurative language, it may have been written by Church himself—Louis LeGrand Noble, by contrast, used much rhetorical flourish in his booklet for The Heart of the Andes. The broadside begins by orienting the viewer to the scene as a whole:

The spectator is supposed to be standing on the ice, in a bay of the berg. The several masses are parts of one immense berg. Imagine an amphitheatre, upon the lower steps of which you stand, and see the icy foreground at your feet, and gaze upon the surrounding masses, all uniting in one beneath the surface of the sea. To the left is overhanging, precipitous ice; to the right is a part of the upper surface of the berg. To that succeeds an inner gorge, running up between Alpine peaks. In front is the main portion of the berg, exhibiting ice-architecture in its vaster proportions. Thus the beholder has around him the manifold forms of the huge Greenland glacier after it has been launched upon the deep, and subjected, for a time, to the action of the elements—waves and currents, sunshine and storm.

The Icebergs' play of light is highly detailed, with the afternoon sun (Note: Church noted during his trip that the icebergs appeared most colorful and dynamic in afternoon light.) somewhere at left casting shadows in blues, purples, and pinks, and the ice and water interacting in complex reflections, especially by the grotto. The viewer's eye is less likely to move vertically, from foreground to background, as it would in most landscape paintings, than to zig-zag. The likely starting point, the ship's mast, seems to point to the boulder and grotto at right, which in turn is oriented toward the large iceberg dominating the background. The boulder and ice around the grotto are painted with impasto, while Church otherwise conceals his brushstrokes. This more turbulent area with its variety of color creates a "material play between surface and depth", according to art historian Jennifer Raab.

A boulder rests on the ice shelf above the grotto and stains the ice a rust color. It serves as a reminder that the iceberg once made contact with land, and stands as a reference to the geological notions of the day, such as Louis Agassiz's theory of the ice age, and Charles Lyell's theory of "continental lift". The general topic of unusually placed ("erratic") boulders was a matter of significant debate at the time. Art historian Timothy Mitchell writes that "The Icebergs is an exultant tribute to time's slow changes. But ... the scientific ideas that informed The Icebergs have long since been discounted by geologists and forgotten by the public. As a consequence, [the painting's] association with the geological process is often overlooked."

The shapes in the ice sometimes form profiles of human-like faces, most pronounced in the repoussoir of ice on the left. As described by Carr, there are also intentional "vague humanoid profiles" on the right, "skull-like" ice blocks in the foreground, and a "floating ice-'siren'" near the grotto. In the foreground, melted water is a light blue, and at upper left a small waterfall deposits water into a patch of emerald beneath. Church observed that freshly frozen water within the cracks of icebergs produced a striking blue color; these veins of sapphire are illustrated at left. In the distance, the largest iceberg shows old waterlines, indicating its continuing ascent, and the foreground appears wetter, having risen from the ocean more recently. Church's signature is on the block of ice to the left of the mast, which was painted in later, and may be seen to form a crucifix. Carr notes that the water level in the grotto is not consistent with that of the rest of the painting.

== Reception ==
Like Church's previous "great pictures", The Icebergs received a single-painting exhibition with an admission fee of 25 cents. It debuted in New York City at Goupil's from April 24 to July 9, 1861, and moved to the Boston Athenæum the next year. The exhibition rooms were prepared theatrically; the painting, itself 1.64 m × 2.85 m (5.4 ft × 9.4 ft), had a massive carved frame, and the room had emerald carpet and maroon divans and wall-cloths. The outbreak of the Civil War put a damper on exhibition attendance, as New York World observed on April 29: "Upon ordinary occasions a new picture by Mr. Church would be for a time an object of central attention to the cultivated community of New York. At present the war excitement absorbs every other, and the picture of the 'Icebergs' has been placed on view at Goupil's without attracting special attention. Last year the announcement of such a work would have packed the gallery from morning till night for weeks; now so intense and eager is the interest concentrated upon the capital, the movements of forces, and the pageantry wherein the town has draped itself, that we doubt if any considerable number of our citizens are aware of its exhibition..."

Church's paintings were greatly anticipated, and many critics responded positively to The Icebergs. The New-York Daily Tribune called it "the most splendid work of art that has as yet been produced in this country.... It is an absolutely wonderful picture, a work of genius that illustrates the time and the country producing it." While The Icebergs was well received, some critics had difficulty relating to the painting. Some resorted to the imaginative, suggesting that the cavern or grotto was the "haunt" of fairies, sirens, or mermaids. In its original form, as seen in the US, the ship's mast had not yet been painted in; thus the painting had no narrative possibility or easily observed meaning. The Albion warned that "ordinary observers ... may perhaps experience some slight disappointment when they miss all familiar objects and find no trace whatever of human association ... no connecting link of any sort between themselves and the canvas." The New York World wrote, "We shall be surprised if those of acute sensibilities do not look upon it at first with a positive feeling of pain, akin to that which we sometimes feel in the presence of the terrible visions of sleep.... The picture is above and beyond criticism ... We think it will require some time to get even on speaking terms with the 'Icebergs.'" Church did not find an American buyer, so the work sat in his Tenth Street studio for some time after the east-coast exhibitions.

Jennifer Raab writes that what disturbed viewers of The Icebergs was its emptiness. Church's previous landscapes related nature with humanity, often via religious symbols. A picture of barren ice offered only solitude—"not Romantic solitude, but rather nature apart from man, shaped by gravity and entropy, resistant to symbolism. This was nature 'uncaring'; this was Darwin's nature." In Raab's analysis of the picture, its limited use of symbols leaves the viewer unable to resort to allegorical readings like those commonly found in the work of Thomas Cole, Church's teacher. Even the addition of the ship's mast is not enough to establish a narrative, according to Raab: "The Icebergs sets us up to construct a story, and yet the picture is more like Church's broadside: an ekphrastic description in which details are not treated hierarchically in terms of their value for the narrative."

== Legacy ==
=== Exhibition and purchase in London ===
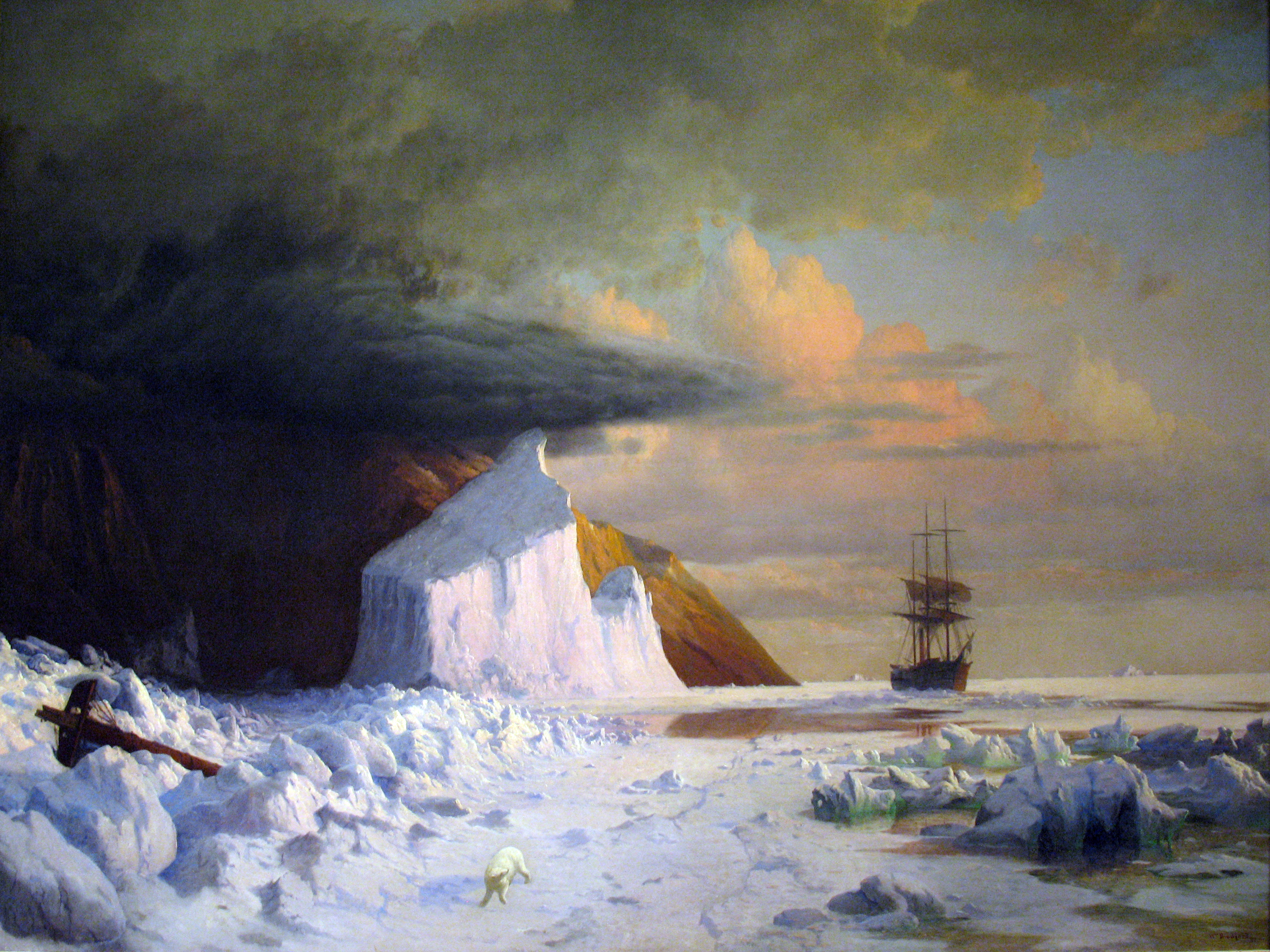
William Bradford's An Arctic Summer: Boring though the Pack in Melville Bay (1871)

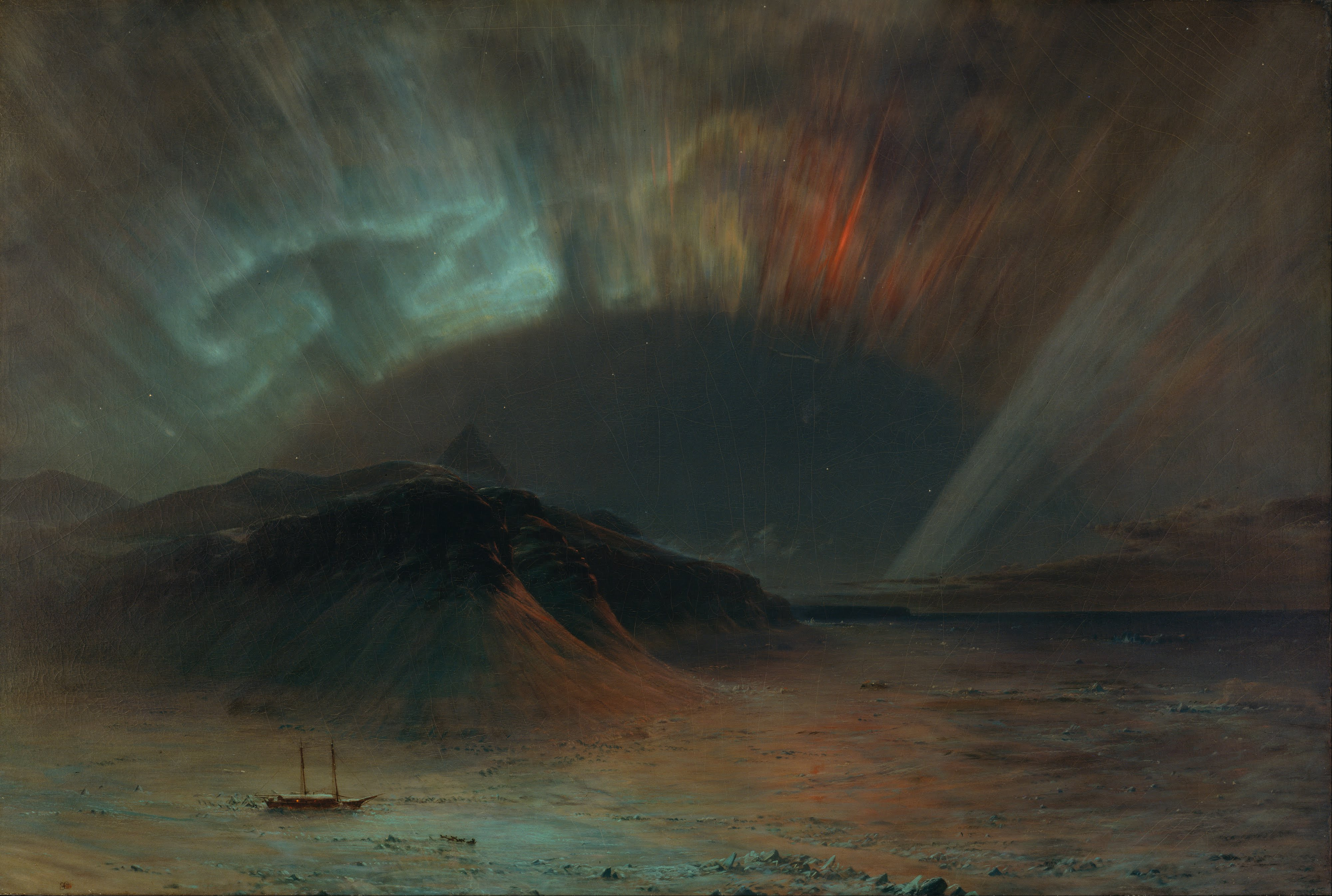
Church, Aurora Borealis (1865): a return to the northern theme. Oil on canvas; 142.3 cm × 212.2 cm (56.0 in × 83.5 in). Smithsonian American Art Museum, Washington, D.C.

Before the canvas was exhibited in London in June 1863, Church renamed it The Icebergs, and added the ship's mast. The mast provides a sense of scale and is a concession to viewers who found the painting lacking in symbolism; English viewers might now have seen it as a tribute to Franklin's expedition. A chromolithograph was made in 1864; Church had put off this reproduction in the US based on the painting's reception. The canvas was well-received in London. Attending a preview for the painting were scientists and luminaries of Arctic expedition such as John Tyndall, Jane Franklin (second wife of the deceased John), Francis McClintock, John Rae, George Back, Edward Belcher, and Richard Collinson.

The Icebergs was purchased by Edward Watkin, a British member of parliament and businessman who played a role in the development of a trans-continental North American railroad. The asking price is unknown, but was probably in the range of $10,000 to $11,500. Watkin hung the painting at his home, Rose Hill, now part of Manchester, England. This was the first and only time that Church found a British patron, although he had tried before.

=== As artistic influence ===
Huntington, whose writing in the 1960s sought to explain the earlier fascination with a then-forgotten artist, explained Church's intentions and the meaning of a landscape of icebergs to a 19th-century American audience: "These grand, mysterious, elemental creatures of the forces were Church's Moby Dycks [sic]. But, as anyone who has read Melville will realize, there is a fundamental difference between the two men. The writer sought to tell his fellow-men that their powers were finite. The painter sought to tell his fellow-men that their powers were infinite. It is the difference between profound Irony and profound Hope.... In 1859, Church's posture before the world was one of absolute confidence."

Other artists were encouraged by the popular exhibition of The Icebergs to create their own Arctic pictures. In the US, marine artist William Bradford travelled to the North Atlantic a number of times beginning in 1861. Bradford was already interested in the Arctic, but Church's painting became an impetus for his career as an Arctic explorer, lecturer, and artist. His Arctic and iceberg paintings were exhibited in the US, England, and Germany. Albert Bierstadt made a number of iceberg paintings into the 1880s, and Thomas Moran produced Spectres of the North in 1891. The exhibitions of The Icebergs in England probably influenced Edwin Landseer's 1864 painting, Man Proposes, God Disposes, which depicts two polar bears tearing at a wreckage that would evoke the lost Franklin expedition.

In 1865, Church returned to the northern theme in a major painting, Aurora Borealis, which, together with his Cotopaxi and Chimborazo, was shown in London that year in a three-painting exhibition. In 1863 he produced a smaller canvas of The Icebergs, then called To Illumine the Iceberg (29 × 47 cm), for patron Samuel Hallett, who paid $300; it is likely the same painting known as The Iceberg and now in the collection of the Mattatuck Museum, Waterbury, Connecticut.

=== Loss, rediscovery, and auction ===
Following the death of Watkin in 1901, The Icebergs, as art historian Eleanor Harvey put it, "more or less sank from sight for three quarters of a century". Rose Hill had become a boys' home, where the painting remained hanging all the while in a little-visited upper landing (but for a six-year gap when the painting was donated to a church, which eventually returned it after it obstructed a local drama club's production). Meanwhile, the American art market lost interest in Church and the Hudson River School. As interest increased in the 1970s, at least two American art dealers began to search for Church's "lost" painting, the lithograph of which had appeared on the cover of a 1966 book about Church in case it might help locate the painting. Both dealers came very close to locating it—some confusion arose from an 1867 report by Henry Tuckerman that a "Mr. Watson, M.P." had purchased the painting, which was "corrected" to "Watkins" by a Boston paper in 1890; these were all valid surnames of potential M.P.s. One investigator ended their journey at a nearby house, and another identified Rose Hill as a likely location, but was discouraged from trying to access the facility. Instead, she spoke by phone with the matron, Mair Baulch, who did not know about the painting in the home. The next year, Baulch independently investigated the painting when she was looking to raise £14,000 for another property. She inquired by letter to the Art Institute of Chicago, which she had once visited, and got as far as negotiating a price (up to $150,000 USD) with Milo Naeve, curator of the Institute's American arts department. The Manchester City Council by this time intervened, identifying the painting as city property, and refused the Art Institute's first offer. Instead, a city manager contacted Sotheby's in London, and the painting was transferred to the Manchester City Art Gallery. The gallery wanted to keep the painting, but Sotheby's estimate of $500,000 was too significant to ignore.

The painting was shipped to Sotheby's in New York City, where it was confirmed to be in excellent condition, needing only cleaning with soap and water, removal of varnish, and adjustments to the stretchers. The importance of the painting drew more sellers to Sotheby's planned auction, hoping to capitalize on the increasing interest in the semi-annual event. On October 25, 1979, eight to ten bidders participated in the auction of The Icebergs, which lasted almost four minutes. Two telephone bidders remained at the $2 million mark, with the winning bid coming at $2.5 million. Not only was the amount the most ever paid at auction for an American painting—which had been set the year before, at $980,000 for George Caleb Bingham's The Jolly Flatboatmen—but it was the third-highest amount paid for any painting at auction. (Note: The two higher amounts belonged to Diego Velázquez's Portrait of Juan de Pareja ($5.24 million) and Titian's The Death of Actaeon ($4 million).) The Icebergs' record for an American painting stood until 1985, when Rembrandt Peale's Rubens Peale with a Geranium sold for $3.7 million. The anonymous buyers of The Icebergs put it on long-term loan with the Dallas Museum of Art, and soon donated it outright. The buyers were identified in 2010 as businessman Lamar Hunt and his wife Norma, who had been equivocal on the subject in 1979, although contemporary reporting was quite certain. According to a 1980 magazine piece, Mair Baulch did not receive any of the sale proceeds to improve her facility, although Harvey, writing in 2002, noted that the council "eventually" purchased the property that Baulch was interested in.

The American press was sometimes critical of the painting and its price. In Time magazine, art critic Robert Hughes disparaged Church while commenting on the escalating prices paid for artworks: "If art was once expected to provoke un nouveau frisson, a new kind of shudder, its present function is to become a new type of bullion. Thus, we are told by art industry flacks, people now respect art. They flock to museums to see it; its spiritual value has been confirmed, for millions, by its wondrous convertibility into cash. You can't argue with it. It means something if somebody pays $2.5 million for a lummocking spread of icebergs by Frederic Church, a salon machine whose pedestrian invocations of the sublime are not worth one square foot of a good Turner."

== The Iceberg (1891) ==
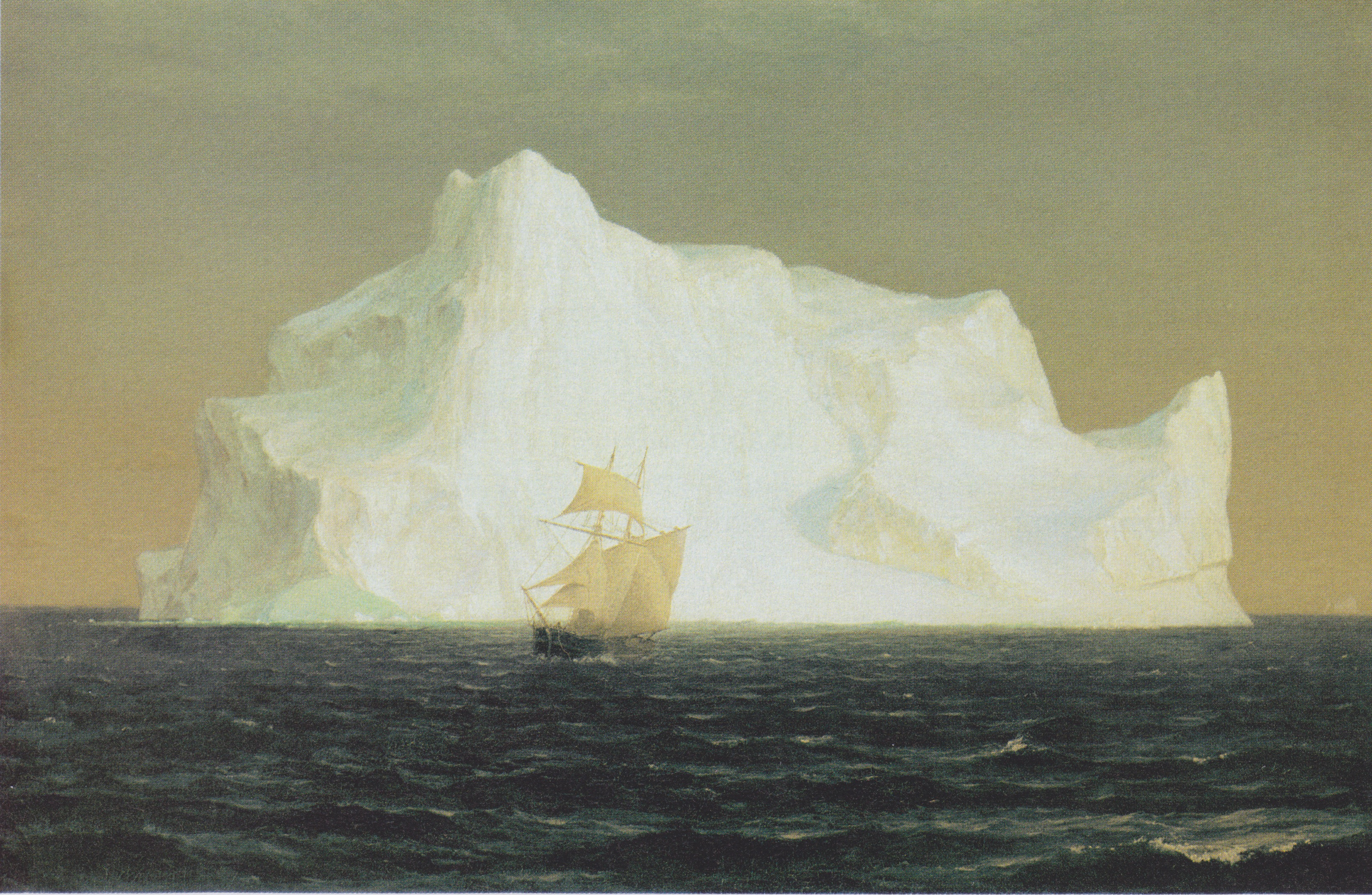
Church, The Iceberg (1891). Oil on canvas; 50.8 cm × 76.2 cm (20.0 in × 30.0 in).

Nine years before his death in 1900 and stricken with arthritis in his painting hand, Church again painted an iceberg, one of his last paintings. The Iceberg (1891) is a simpler composition than his 1861 picture. Describing The Iceberg, Huntington notes the changes in Church's style and outlook: "Church was seldom more charming than in this late painting. Gone is the compulsive striving to say the last word about his subject, the passion to know and master the universe. The later painting seems, rather, the pensive memory of an experience.... The physically inactive man of sixty-five seems to be content to stand still and not to say, but only to suggest all. He was no longer moving forward 'with the momentum of mankind', impelled by a national enthusiasm of the hour. The Iceberg of 1891 is the lonely confrontation of a lonely man who sees himself on that ship of yesterday sailing for safety from a strangely drifting, isolated and indifferent white creature of the elements.... Instead of 'restlessness' and 'exhilaration' and 'wild ungovernableness', there is quiet beauty and mystery. There is no world prophecy here but instead the introspection of a man cut off from his time, yet somehow still believing in himself." Church was pleased with the painting, writing to a friend that it was "the best I ever painted and the truest". It is now in the collection of the Carnegie Museum of Art in Pittsburgh.

== Gallery ==
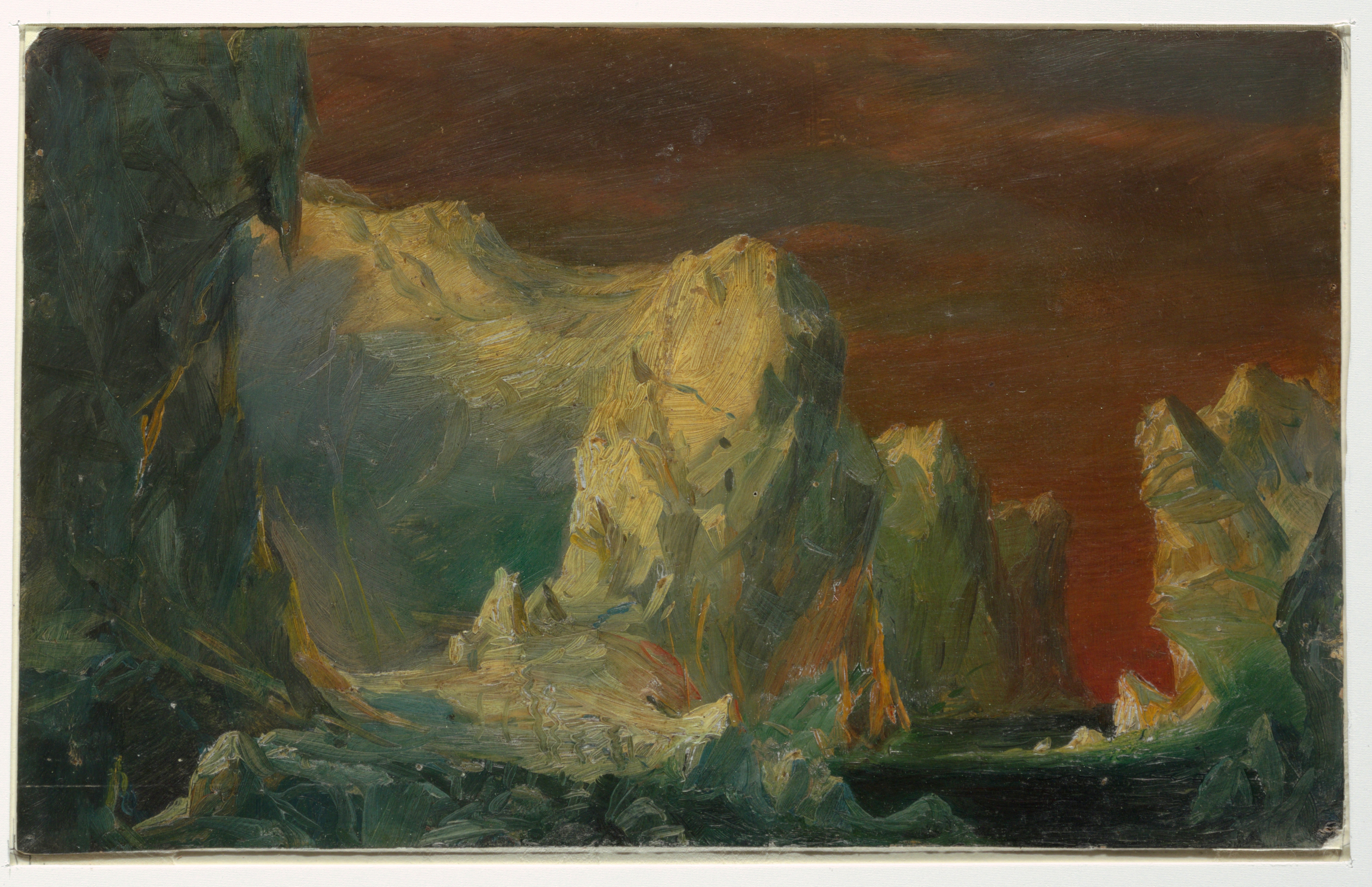
An 1860 study. Oil on paperboard; 16.3 cm × 26.3 cm (6.4 in × 10.4 in). Cooper-Hewitt Museum

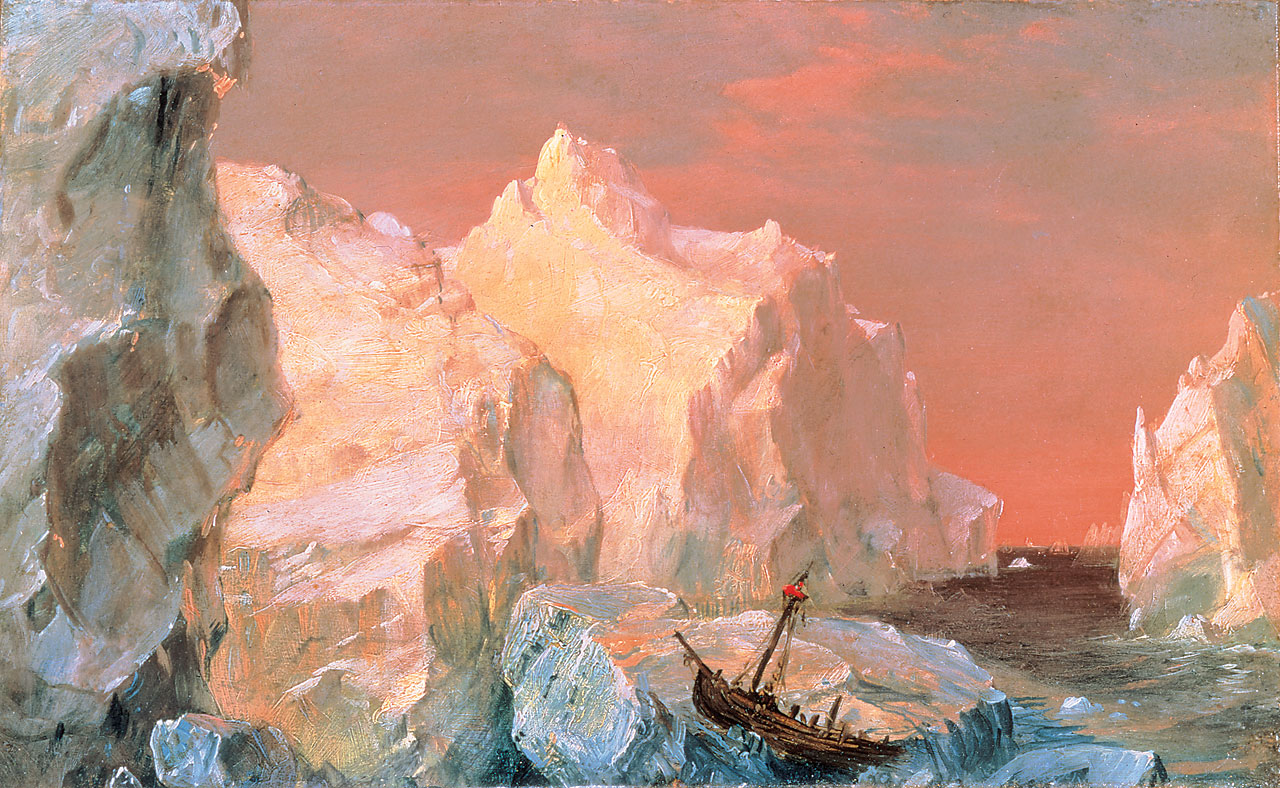
An 1860 study. Oil on paperboard mounted on canvas; 21 cm × 31.1 cm (8.3 in × 12.2 in). Kennedy Galleries, New York

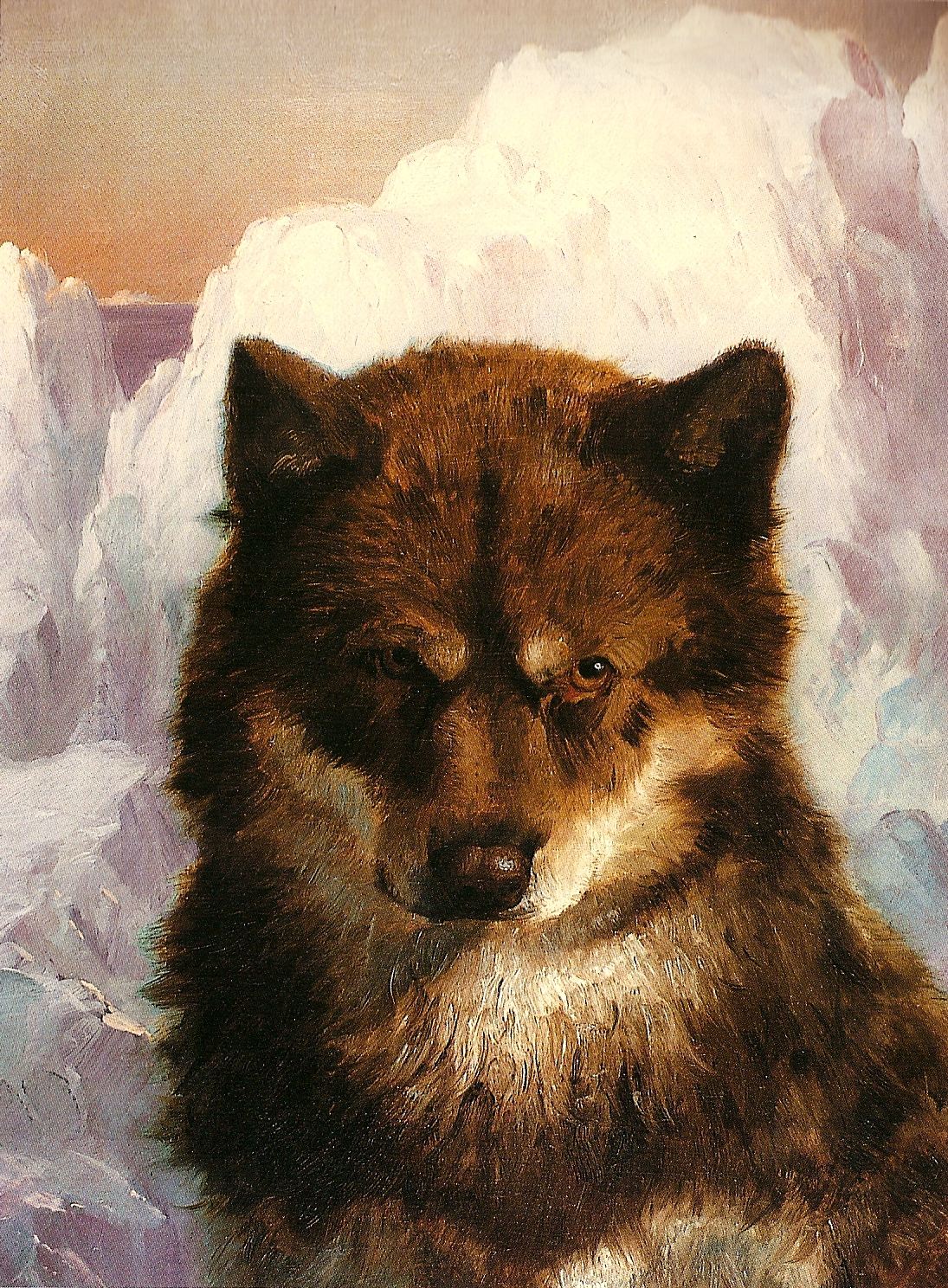
Church made a portrait of Oosisoak, his friend Isaac Israel Hayes' sled dog, in about two hours (c. 1861).

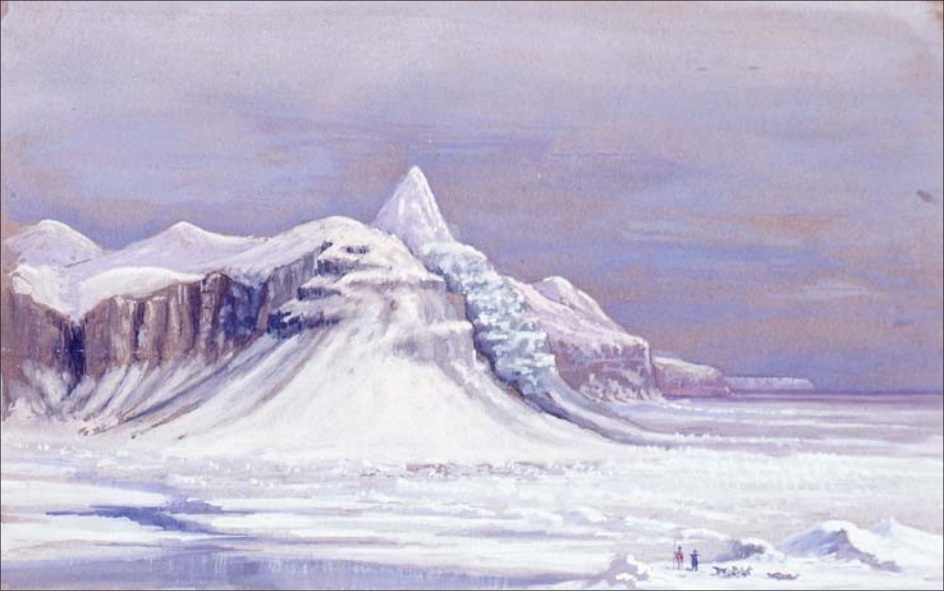
Hayes, who had received rudimentary instruction in draftsmanship from Church, made a watercolor sketch of Church's Peak (1861). 17.1 cm × 26.7 cm (6.7 in × 10.5 in). Olana State Historic Site, OL.1980.1894.

== See also ==
- List of paintings by Frederic Edwin Church
