= William Bradford (painter) =

American painter

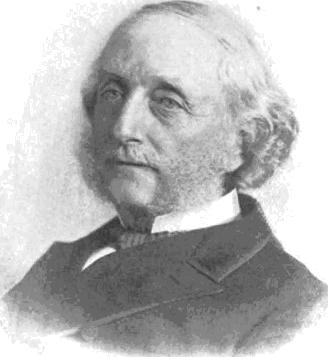
William Bradford, artist and photographer

William Bradford (April 30, 1823 – April 25, 1892) was an American romanticist painter, photographer and explorer, originally from Fairhaven, Massachusetts, near New Bedford. His early work focused on portraits of the many ships in New Bedford Harbor. In 1858, his painting New Bedford Harbor at Sunset was included in Albert Bierstadt's landmark New Bedford Art Exhibition.

== Career ==
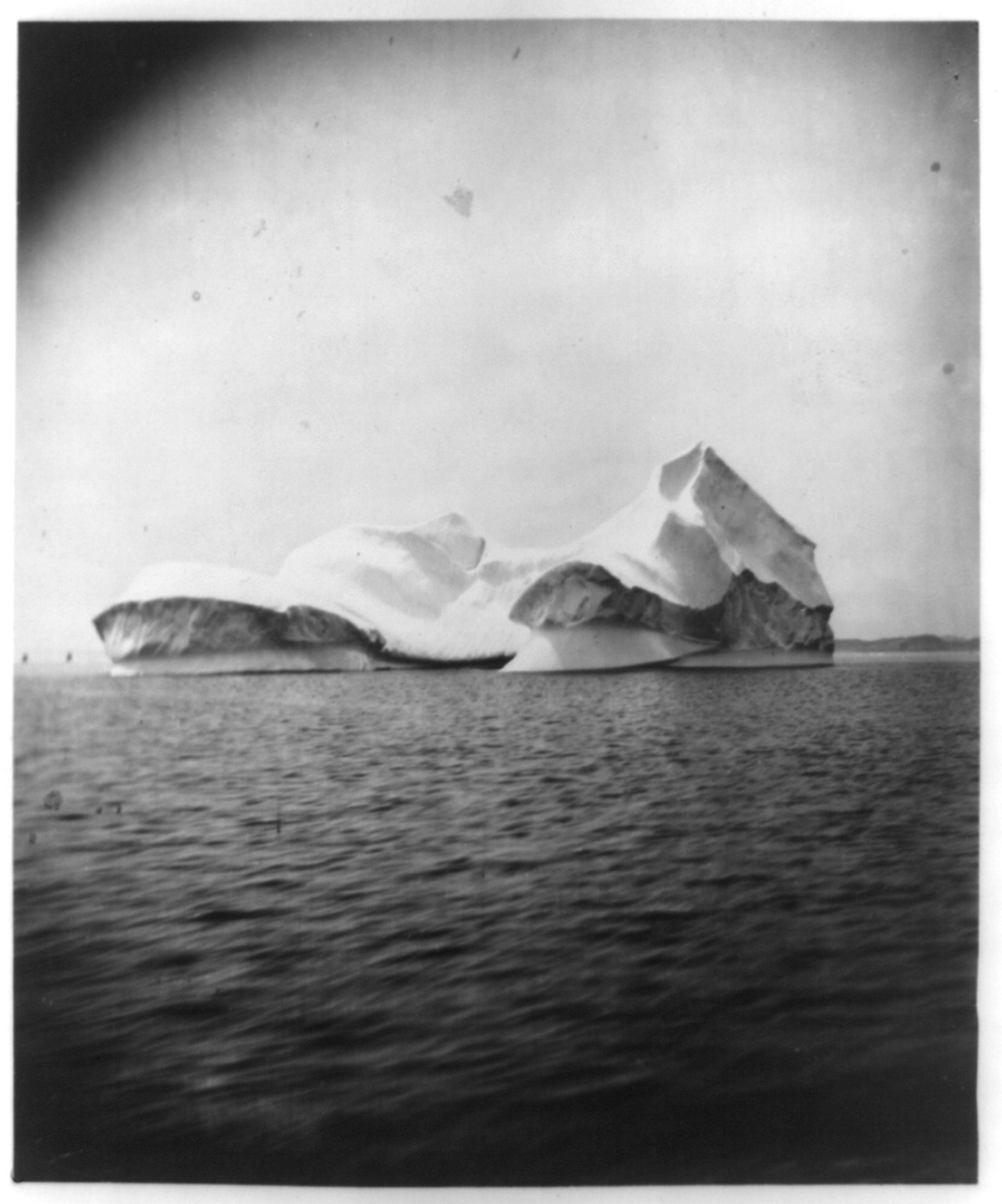
Iceberg photograph by William H. Pierce during 1864 northern excursion by William Bradford

He is known for his paintings of ships and Arctic seascapes. From 1861 to 1866 he made excursions north to Labrador with Dr. Isaac Israel Hayes. He was one of the first American painters to portray the frozen regions of the north: for example, his contemporary Frederic Edwin Church had painted The Icebergs in 1861; Albert Bierstadt was also active in the same period. Bradford was accompanied by photographer William H. Pierce on his 1864 expedition, which resulted in the first iceberg photographs taken in arctic regions.

In 1862, Boston, he was an art teacher to Charles Dormon Robinson.

With funds provided by LeGrand Lockwood, Bradford traveled to Greenland in 1869, his farthest northern excursion, reaching eventually as far as 75° north latitude aboard the steamship Panther, accompanied by photographers John L. Dunmore and George Critcherson. Upon his return, Bradford spent two years in London, where he published an account of his trips to the north, entitled The Arctic regions, illustrated with photographs taken on an art expedition to Greenland; with descriptive narrative by the artist.(London, 1873) In 1874, he was elected into the National Academy of Design as an Associate member.

He was associated with the Hudson River School, not an institution but rather an informal group of like-minded painters. He adopted their techniques and became highly interested in the way light touches water and how it affects the appearance of water surfaces and the general atmospherics of a painting. He compositionally balanced many of his paintings by creating a counter-subject and by placing darker colors around the edges, framing and counteracting the center's better-lit subject.

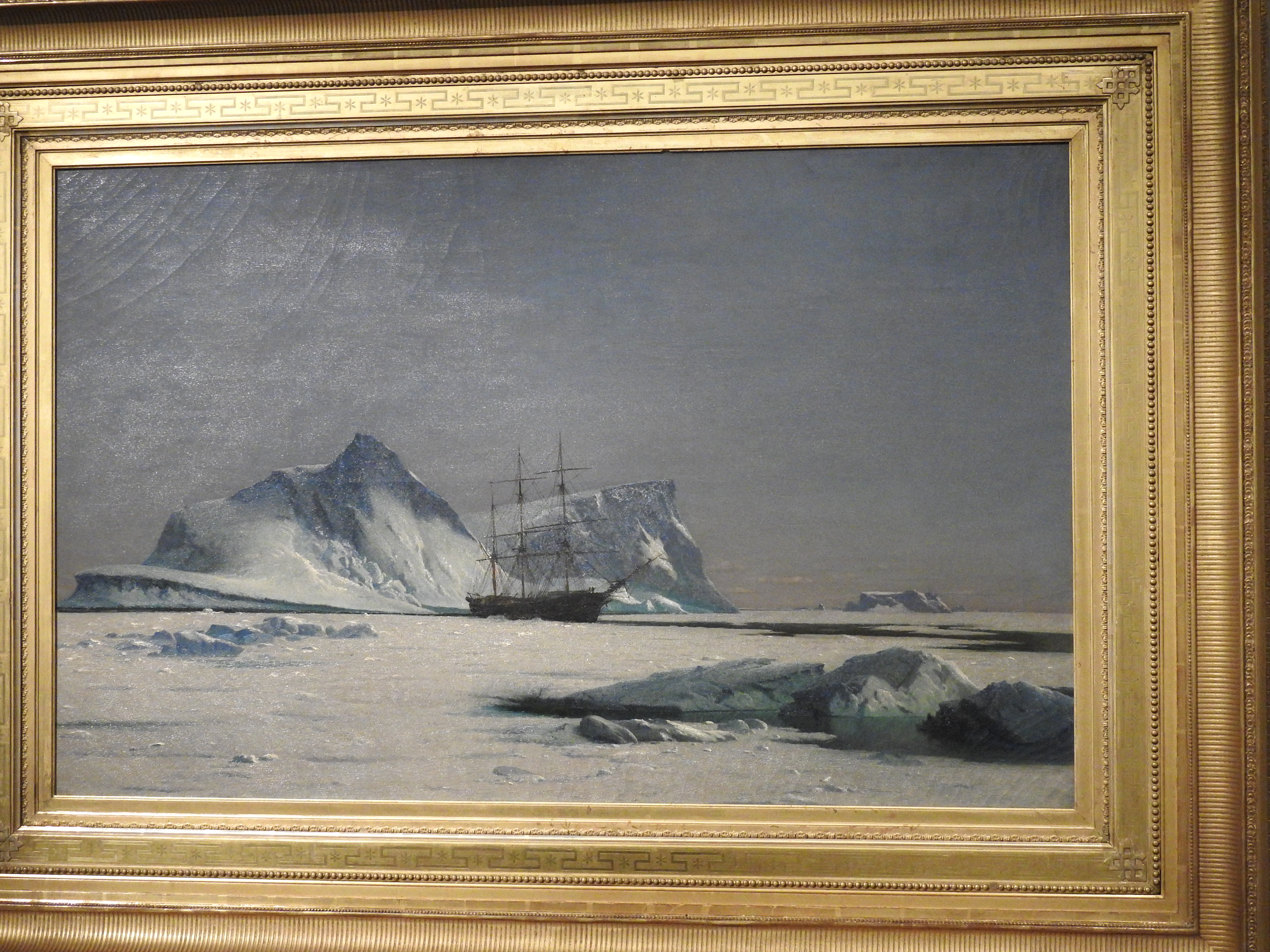
Scene in the Arctic ca. 1880, de Young Museum San Francisco

== Gallery ==
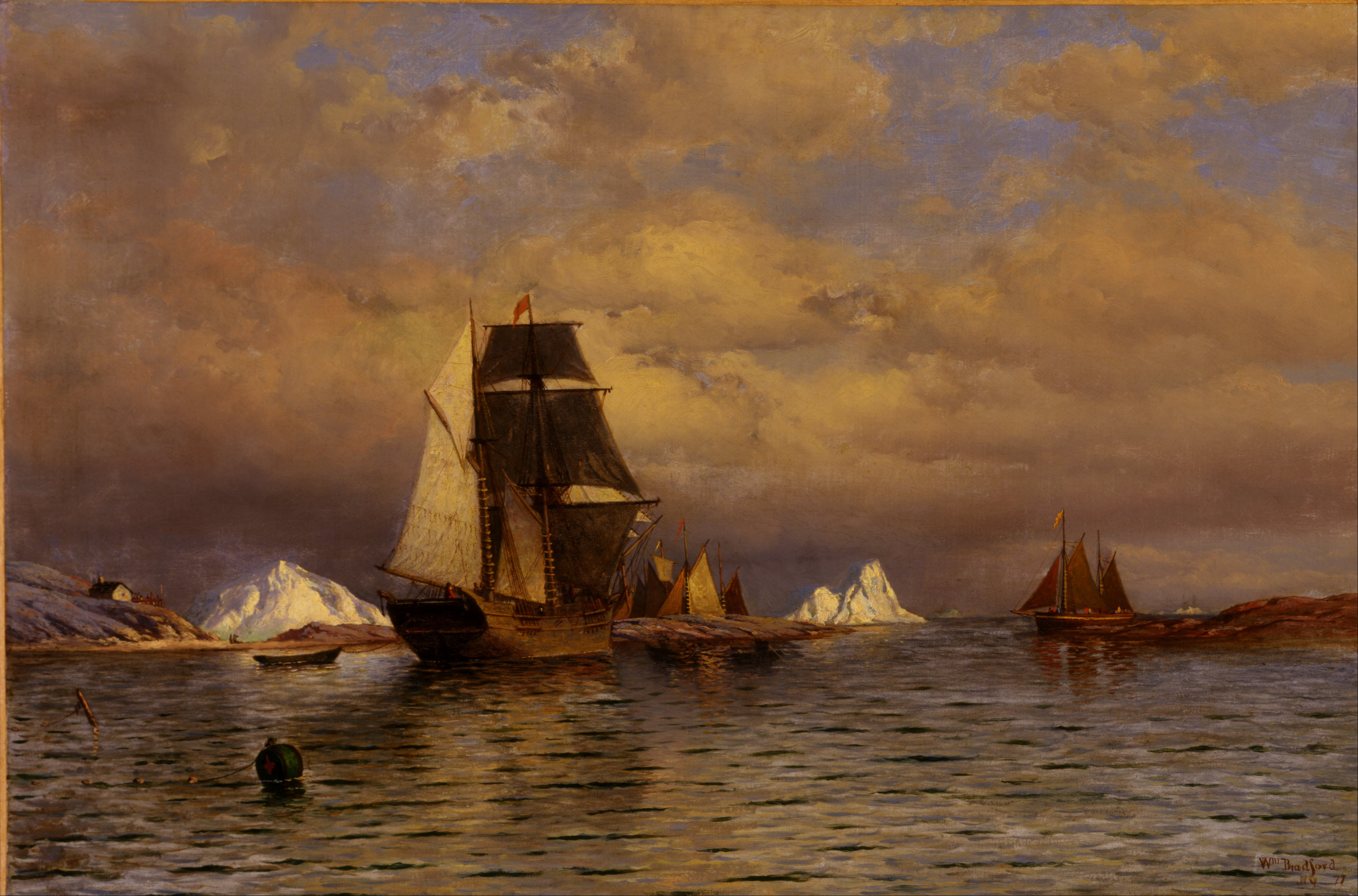
Looking out of Battle Harbor, 1877

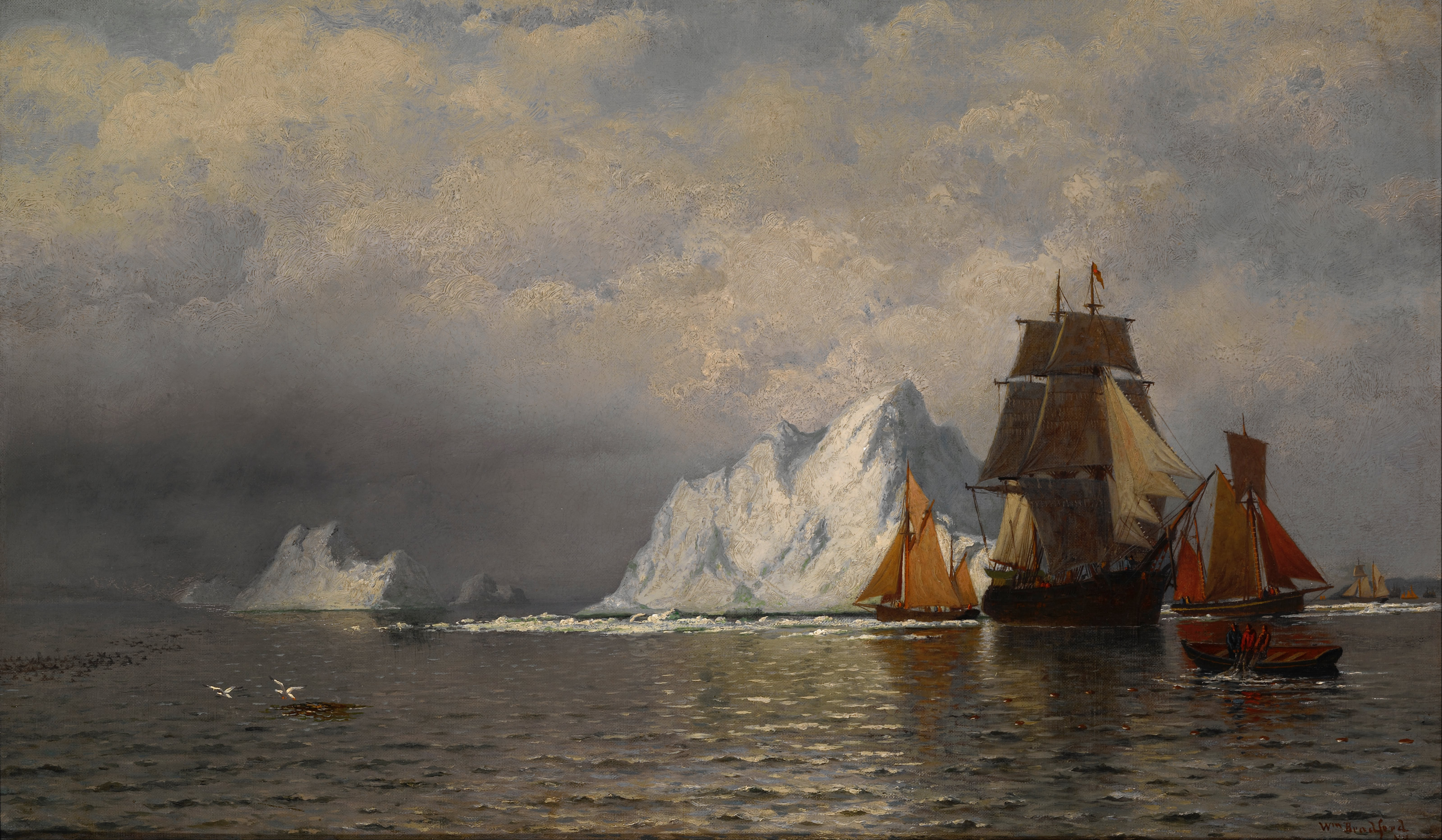
Whaler And Fishing Vessels Near The Coast Of Labrador, c. 1880

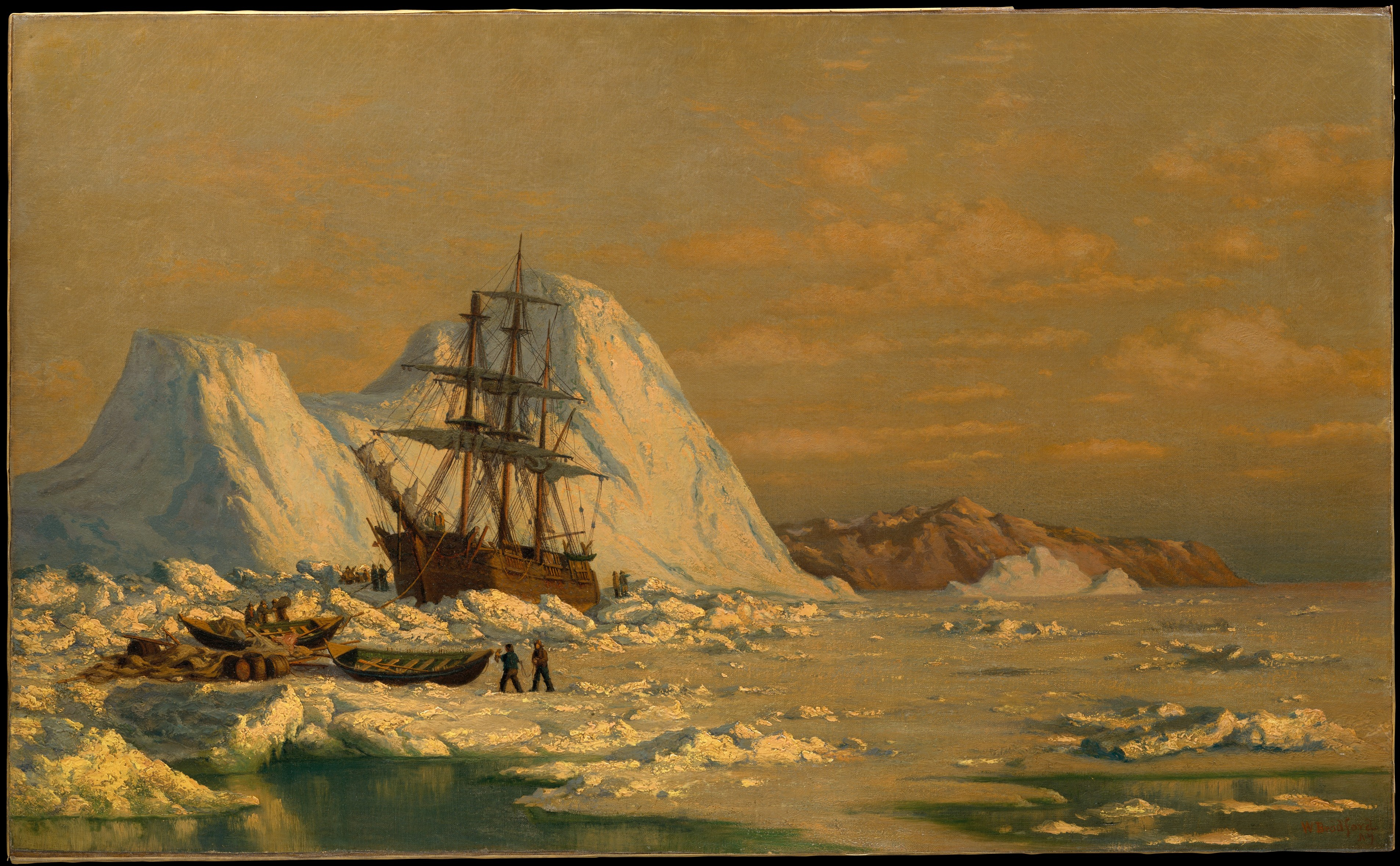
An Incident of Whaling

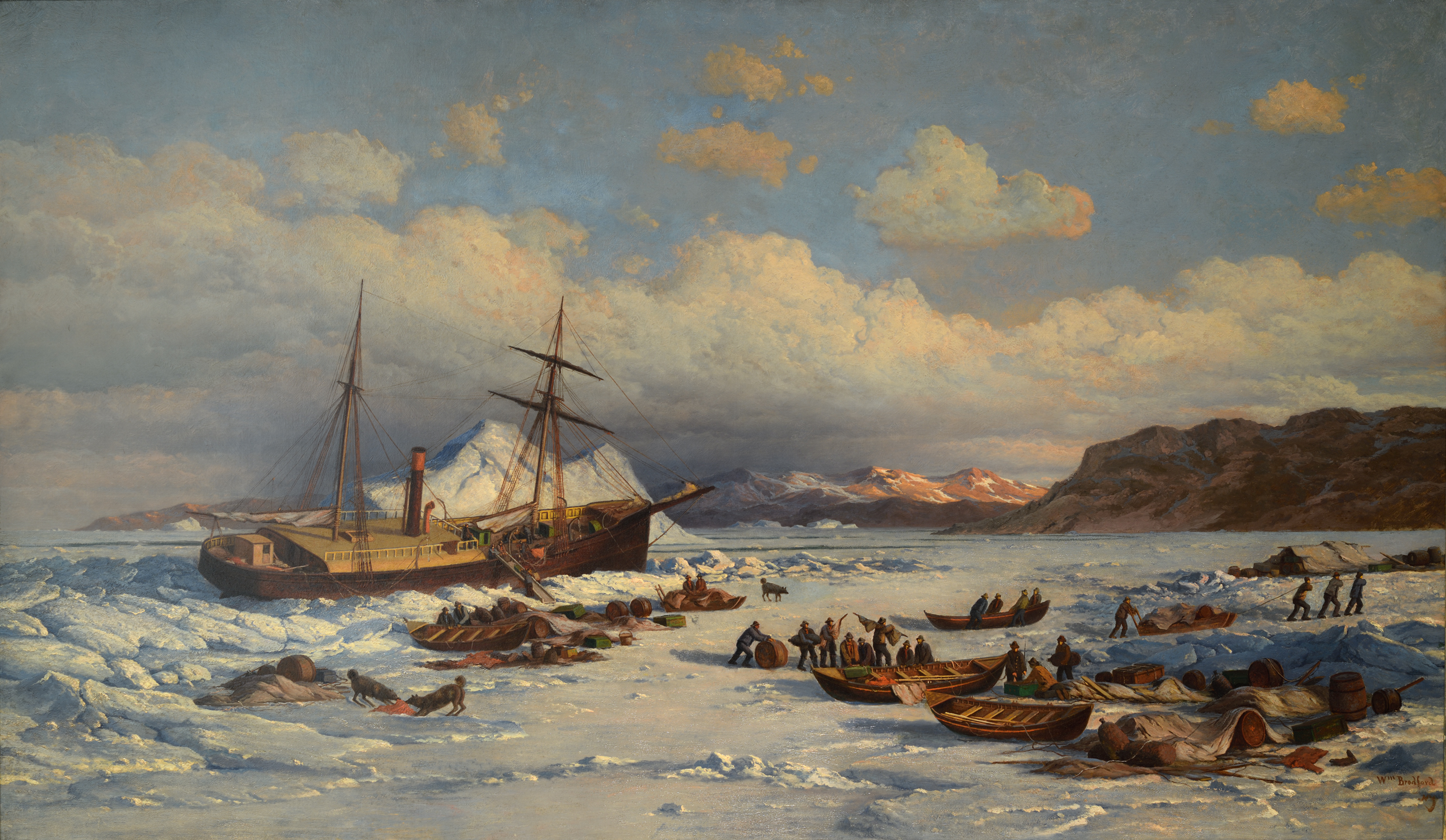
Voyage of the Polaris, 1875
