= Eleanor Jones Harvey =

American museum curator

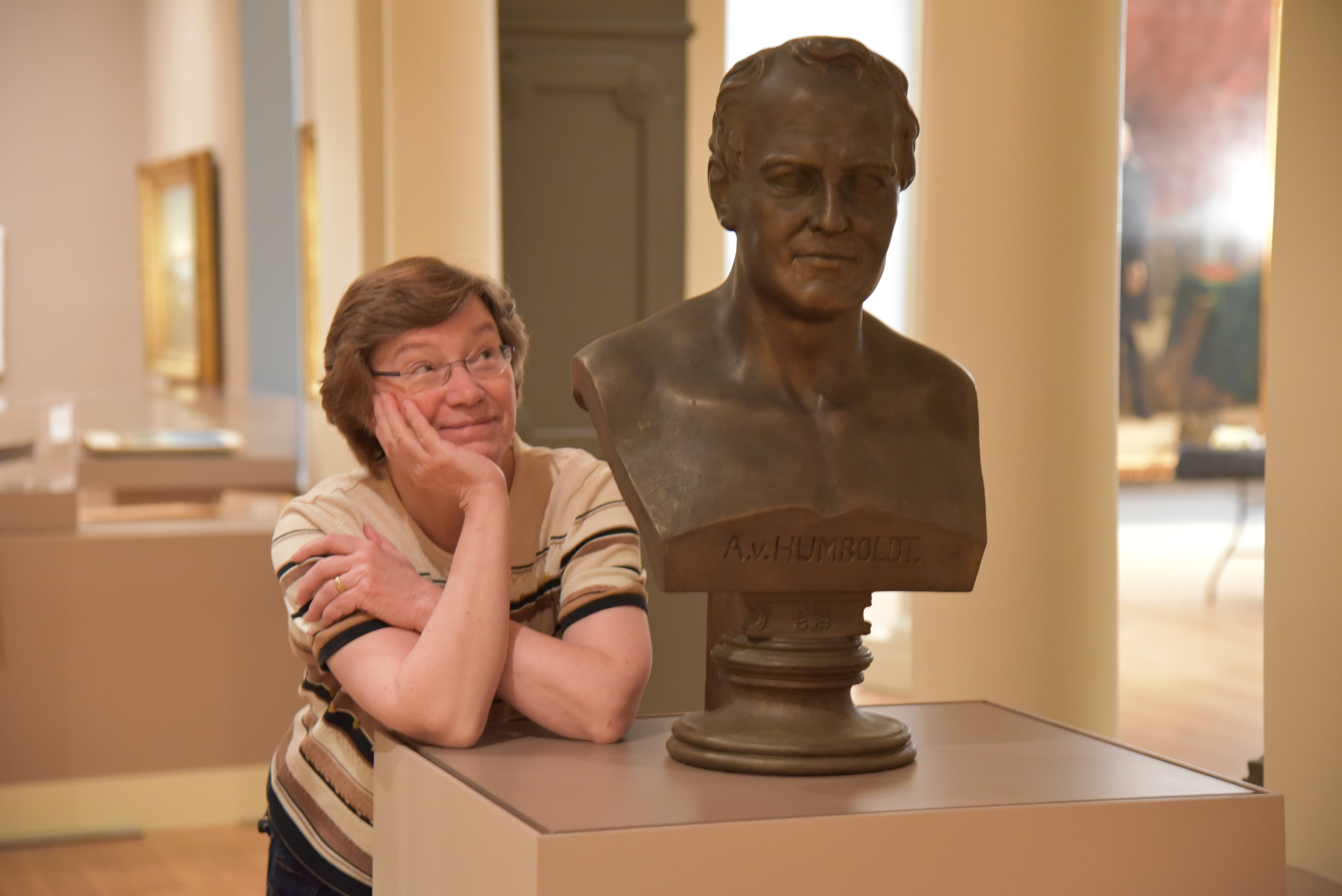
Eleanor Harvey with the Henry Berger bust of Humboldt, owned by the National Museum of Natural History, Smithsonian Institution, 2020

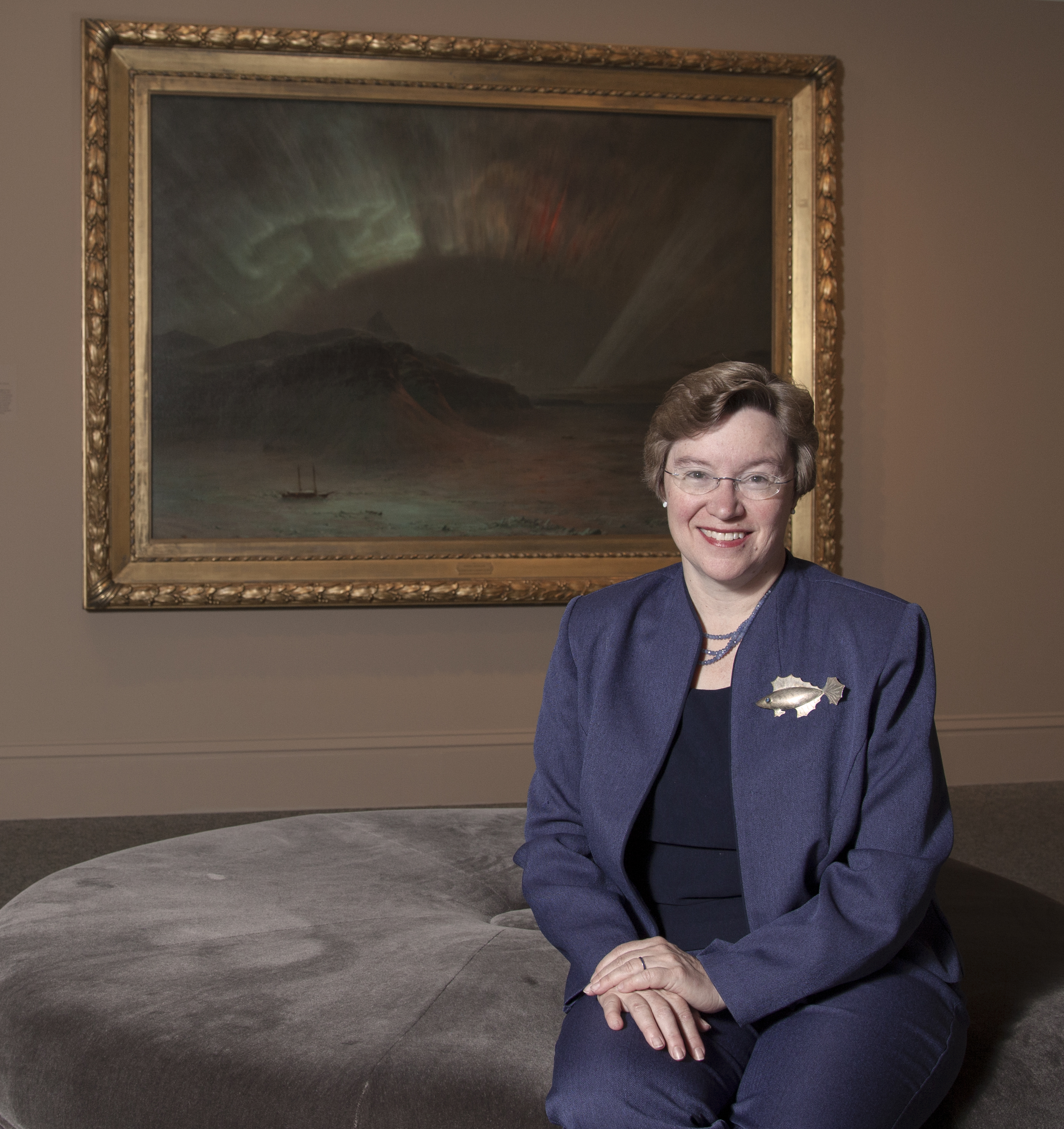
Eleanor Jones Harvey, with Frederic Edwin Church's painting Aurora Borealis (1865)

Eleanor Jones Harvey is an American museum curator, senior curator at the Smithsonian American Art Museum.

== Career ==
Eleanor Harvey was born in Washington, D.C., and earned a B.A. with distinction from the University of Virginia, as well as an M.A. and Ph.D. from Yale University, in Art History. She served as curator of American art at the Dallas Museum of Art from 1992 to 2002. In January 2003, she became the curator for the Luce Foundation Center for American Art at the Smithsonian American Art Museum, and served as the museum's Chief Curator from 2003 until 2012. She is currently Senior Curator. Her research interests include 19th- and 20th-century American art, landscape painting, Alexander von Humboldt, Southwestern abstraction, and Texas art. Her most recent exhibitions at the Smithsonian American Art Museum were Alexander von Humboldt and the United States: Art, Nature, and Culture in 2020–2021, The Civil War and American Art in 2012–13, Variations on America: Masterworks from the American Art Forum Collections in 2007, and An Impressionist Sensibility: The Halff Collection in 2006.

Her book, The Civil War and American Art, which accompanied the exhibit of the same name, won the 2012 Southeastern Book Festival Award for Best Art or Photography Book.

For her book, Alexander von Humboldt and the United States: Art, Nature, and Culture, (also accompanying an exhibit of the same name) she was awarded the Secretary's Distinguished Research Prize from the Smithsonian Congress of Scholars in 2021. This award targets Smithsonian Museum researchers and carries a $2000 cash prize to be utilized for further research.

== Works ==
- Alexander von Humboldt and the United States: Art, Nature, and Culture. Princeton University Press, 2020, ISBN 9780691200804

External videos
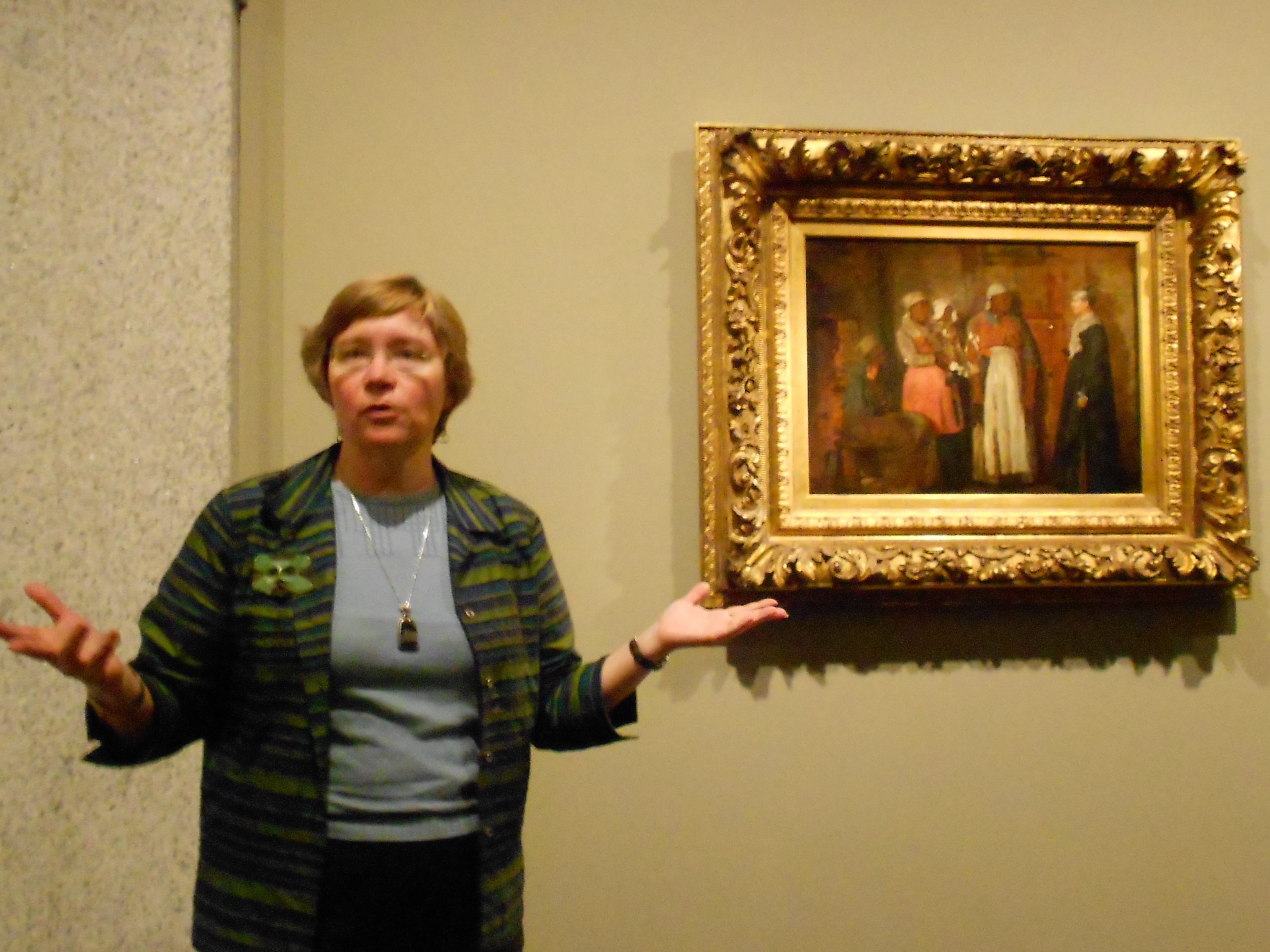
- The Civil War and American Art, C-SPAN, November 15, 2012
- Podcast: The Civil War and American Art, Episode 1, Smithsonian American Art Museum

- Eleanor Jones Harvey (2013-02-05). "America's Moral Volcano". The New York Times.
- The Civil War and American Art. Yale University Press. 2012. ISBN 9780300187335.
- An Impressionist Sensibility: The Halff Collection. Smithsonian American Art Museum, 2006, ISBN 9781904832324
- Avery, Kevin J. & Kelly, Frank (2003). Hudson River School Visions: The Landscapes of Sanford R. Gifford. New York: The Metropolitan Museum of Art. ISBN 9780300101843. (includes essay by Harvey)
- Eleanor Jones Harvey, Gerald L. Carr. The Voyage of the Icebergs: Frederic Church's Arctic Masterpiece. Dallas Museum of Art, 2002, ISBN 9780300095364
- The Painted Sketch: American Impressions from Nature, 1830-1880. Dallas Museum of Art, 1998. New York: Harry Abrams, 1998, ISBN 9780810963641
