= Milo Naeve =

American art historian, curator, and museum administrator (1931–2009)

- Born: Milo Merle Naeve; October 9, 1931; Arnold, Kansas, US
- Died: August 10, 2009 (aged 77); Kennett Square, Pennsylvania, US
- Education: University of Colorado (BFA); University of Delaware (MA)
- Occupation(s): Art historian, museum curator, museum administrator
- Employer: Art Institute of Chicago

Milo Merle Naeve (October 9, 1931 – August 10, 2009) was an American art historian, curator, and museum administrator who worked at the Winterthur Museum, Garden and Library, Colonial Williamsburg, the Colorado Springs Fine Arts Center, and the Art Institute of Chicago, where he held the first curatorship in American arts and the first endowed curatorship at the Institute.

== Early life and education ==
Naeve was born on a farm in Arnold, Kansas, on October 9, 1931, the youngest of three sons of Fern and Bernhardt Naeve. He grew up in Kansas and Colorado and received his Bachelor of Fine Arts degree from the University of Colorado in 1953. In June 1955, he received his Master of Arts degree from the University of Delaware as a member of the second graduating class of the Winterthur Program in Early American Culture. He joined the United States Army in September 1955, and served two years in the Medical Corps. He was stationed in Hawaii. In 1958, he was in the 390th Civil Affairs Military Government Group of the United States Army Reserve in Delaware as a specialist 3rd class.

== Career and honors ==
In September 1957 Naeve became a curatorial assistant at the Winterthur Museum, Garden and Library, gaining a promotion to assistant curator in January 1959. In October 1959 he became the museum's registrar and secretary, succeeding Dean Abner Fales Jr., who resigned to become director at the Essex Institute. Naeve held this position through 1963 before becoming the founding editor of the Winterthur Portfolio, in which capacity he supervised the production of this journal's first three volumes, published between 1964 and 1967. After departing Winterthur, Naeve worked as a curator at Colonial Williamsburg and as director of the Colorado Springs Fine Arts Center.

In 1975, Naeve became the first American arts curator at the Art Institute of Chicago. Through sheer drive, he elevated the holdings and profile of the American arts at this European-centric museum, founding a new American Arts Department and assuming the newly endowed position of Field-McCormick Curator of American Arts—the first endowed curatorship in the Art Institute's history—in 1984. He supervised the planning and installation of the Field-McCormick Galleries of American Arts, which opened in 1988. Naeve retired in 1991 with the honorary title of curator emeritus. He received an inaugural Lifetime Achievement Award from the Illinois Academy of Fine Arts. He had faced controversy in 1979 when he undervalued Frederic Edwin Church's The Icebergs, offering up to $150,000 for a painting that sold at auction for $2.5 million.

Naeve served on the boards of the Biggs Museum of American Art, the Library Company of Philadelphia, the Skowhegan School of Painting and Sculpture, and the journal American Art. He was a member of the Grolier Club and the Century Association in New York and a Life Fellow of the Royal Society of Arts.

Naeve's papers are held at the Winterthur Library, to which they were donated by his wife after his death.

== Personal life and death ==
After retirement, Naeve moved to Kennett Square, Pennsylvania, and joined the Episcopalian congregation of the Christ Church Christiana Hundred in Greenville, Delaware. He died from lung cancer at his home on August 10, 2009. He was survived by his wife of 55 years, Nancy Jamer, whom he had married on July 18, 1954.

== Select publications ==
- Naeve, Milo M. (1987). John Lewis Krimmel: An Artist in Federal America. University of Delaware Press. ISBN 9780874132328. OCLC 11784921.
- Naeve, Milo M. (1981). Identifying American Furniture: A Pictorial Guide to Styles and Terms, Colonial to Contemporary. American Association for State and Local History. ISBN 9780910050524. OCLC 7460770.
