= Winterthur Portfolio =

- Discipline: Arts
- Language: English
- Edited by: Catharine Dann Roeber

Publication details
- History: 1964–present
- Publisher: University of Chicago Press for the Winterthur Museum, Garden and Library (United States)
- Frequency: Triannually

Standard abbreviations
- ISO 4: Winterthur Portf.

Indexing
- ISSN: 0084-0416
- JSTOR: 00840416
- OCLC no.: 1139282166

Links
- Journal homepage

Winterthur Portfolio is an academic journal published by the University of Chicago Press. The journal covers articles on the arts and decorative arts in the United States and the historical context within which they were developed. Interdisciplinary articles study art and artifacts in their cultural framework. The journal is sponsored by the Winterthur Museum, Garden and Library. The journal's founding editor was curator Milo Naeve, who supervised production of the first three volumes between 1964 and 1967.
