= Aurora Borealis (painting) =

Painting by Frederic Edwin Church

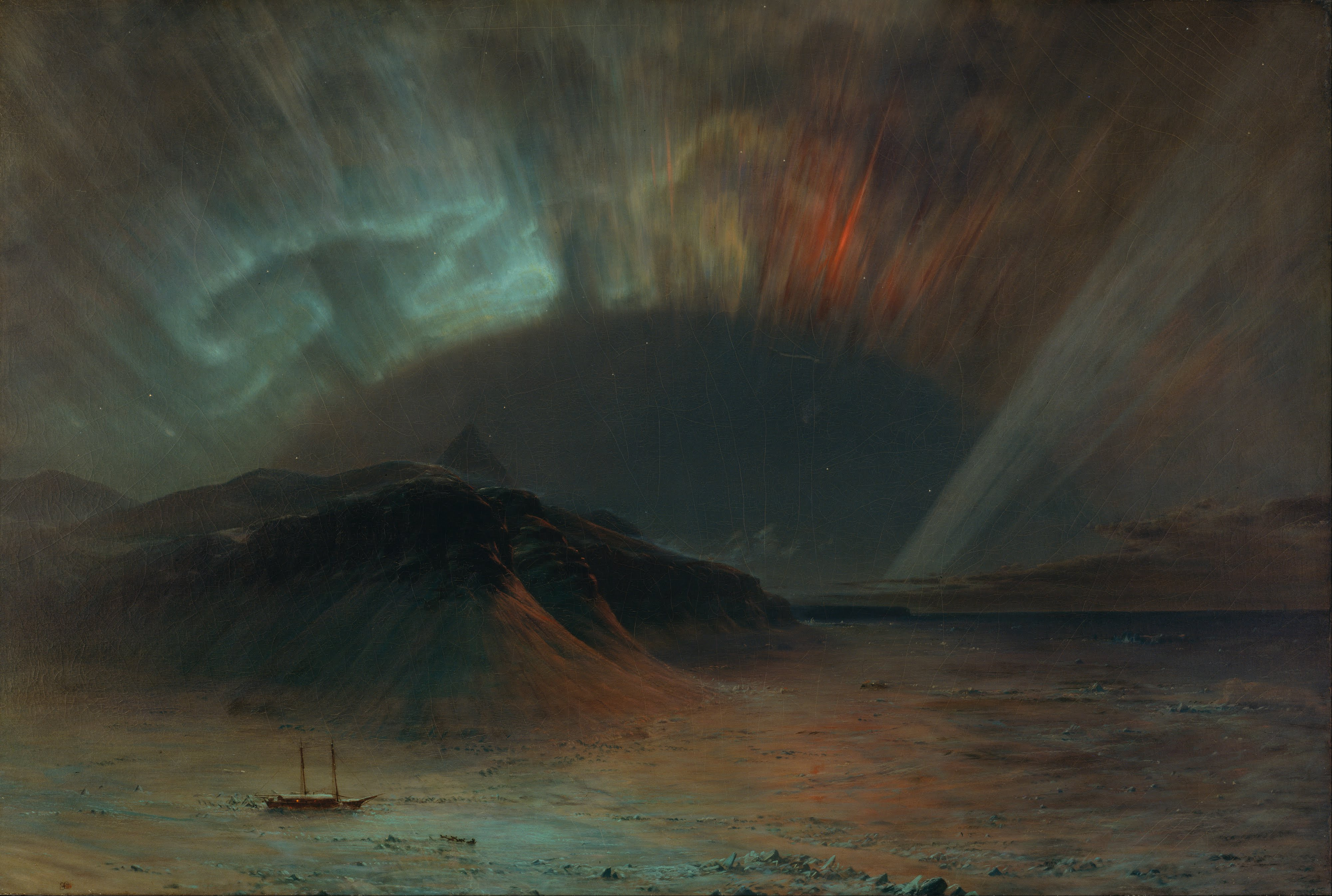
- Artist: Frederic Edwin Church
- Year: 1865
- Medium: Oil on canvas
- Dimensions: 142.3 cm × 212.2 cm (56 in × 83.5 in)
- Location: Smithsonian American Art Museum; Washington, D.C.
- Website: Collections

Aurora Borealis is an 1865 painting by the American artist Frederic Edwin Church of the aurora borealis and the Arctic expedition of Isaac Israel Hayes. The painting measures 142.3 by 212.2 centimetres (56.0 in × 83.5 in) and is now owned by the Smithsonian American Art Museum.

== Background ==
Aurora Borealis is based on two separate sketches. The first incident was an aurora witnessed by Church's pupil, the Arctic explorer Isaac I. Hayes. Hayes provided a sketch and description of the aurora borealis display he witnessed one January evening. Coinciding with Hayes' furthest northern movement into what he named Cape Leiber, the aurora borealis appeared over the peak.

Describing the event, Hayes wrote:

The light grew by degrees more and more intense, and from irregular bursts it settled into an almost steady sheet of brightness... The exhibition, at first tame and quiet, became in the end startling in its brilliancy. The broad dome above me is all ablaze... The colour of the light was chiefly red, but this was not constant, and every hue mingled in the fierce display. Blue and yellow streamers were playing in the lurid fire; and, sometimes starting side by side from the wide expanse of the illuminated arch, they melt into each other, and throw a ghostly glare of green into the face and over the landscape. Again this green overrides the red; blue and orange clasp each other in their rapid flight; violet darts tear through a broad flush of yellow, and countless tongues of white flame, formed of these uniting streams, rush aloft and lick the skies.

== Description and influences ==
The iconography of the painting suggested personal and nationalistic references. The peak in the painting had been named after Church during Hayes's expedition. Aurora Borealis incorporated details of Hayes' ship, drawn from a sketch he brought back upon returning from his expedition. Contrasted with Church's earlier painting of the north, The Icebergs (1861), the intact ship highlights Hayes' achievement in navigating this space, as well as the state of the nation in navigating the contentious historical moment. Presenting the ship's safe passage through the dark Arctic environment, Church suggested optimism for the future; a tiny light shines out from the ship's window.

Charles Millard describes Church's paintings as "large in scale and size, sharply horizontal in format" and "dramatic in subject, but yielding in execution, and tend[ing] to exploit both value contrast and continuous tonal transition." Church's works, including Aurora Borealis, were completed using small touches of pigment built together through thin applications, leaving the viewer unaware of fracture between strokes. These works are also built around the tones of "ochre, brown, gray going to blue or green, and green" at the expense of the full value of color.

== Exhibition ==
Completed in New York that winter, Aurora Borealis was exhibited publicly in London in 1865 as a triumvirate with two paintings by Church of Ecuadoran volcanoes: Cotopaxi (his 1862 painting of an eruption) and Chimborazo (his 1864 reprise of the dormant mountain that had been the subject of his 1858 masterwork Heart of the Andes).

== Reception and legacy ==
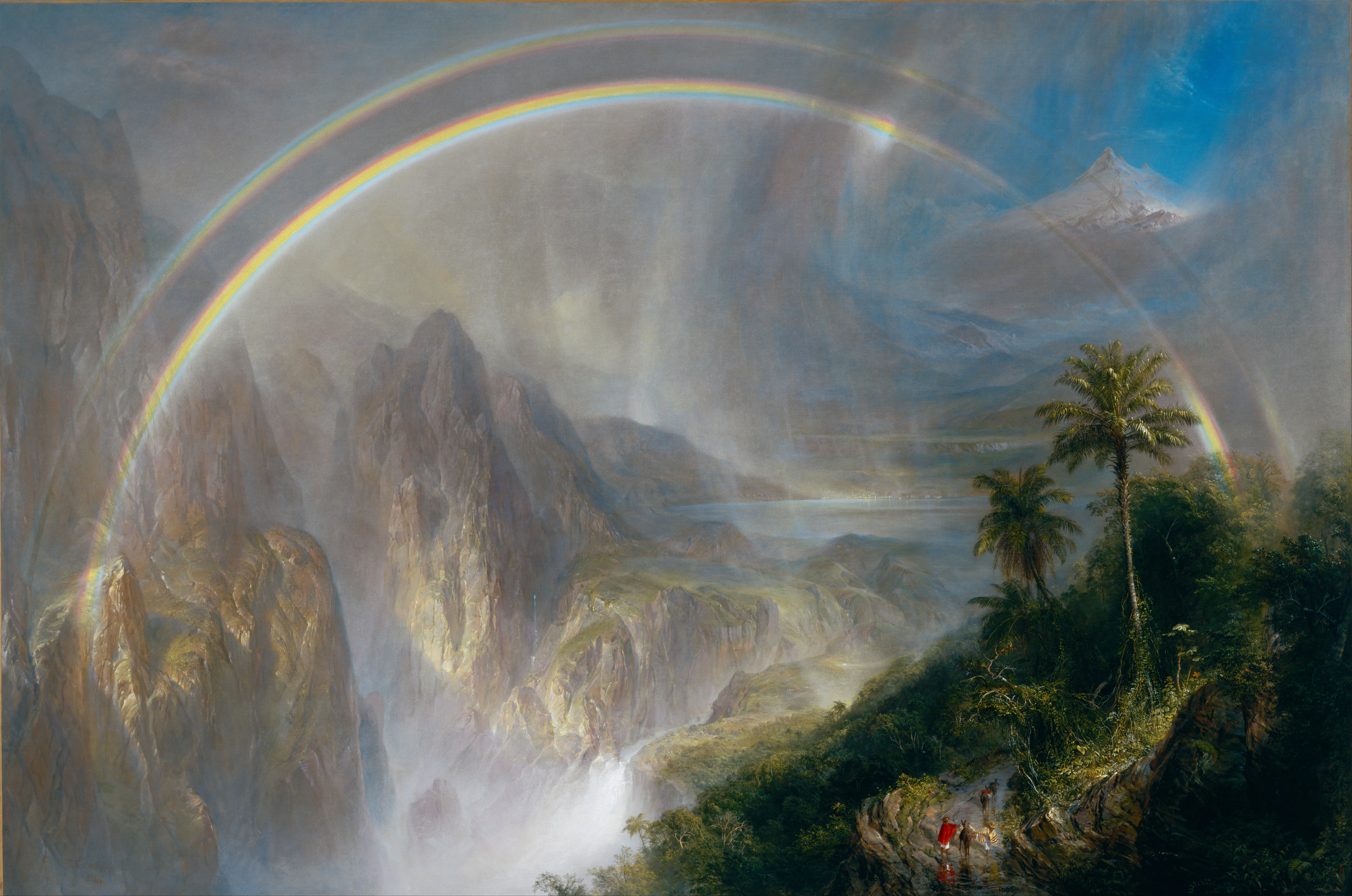
Rainy Season in the Tropics, 1866.

Created at the end of the American Civil War, Aurora Borealis (1865) was believed to depict the portent of a simultaneously triumphant and desolate Union victory, its meaning amplified in relation to later works, including The After Glow (1867) and other works.

Aurora Borealis (1865) was associated with Rainy Season in the Tropics (1866) for two reasons. First, the two paintings marked the completion of the arctic-tropical sequence created with The Heart of the Andes (1859) and The North, also known as The Icebergs (1861). These pairings drew together popular attention on exploration of the arctic North and the tropical South. The second association between Aurora Borealis and Rainy Season in the Tropics was established through their compositions and "in their luminosity", where each suggested a "renewed optimism in natural and historic events".

== See also ==
- List of paintings by Frederic Edwin Church
