= Isaac Israel Hayes =

American explorer and physician (1832–1881)

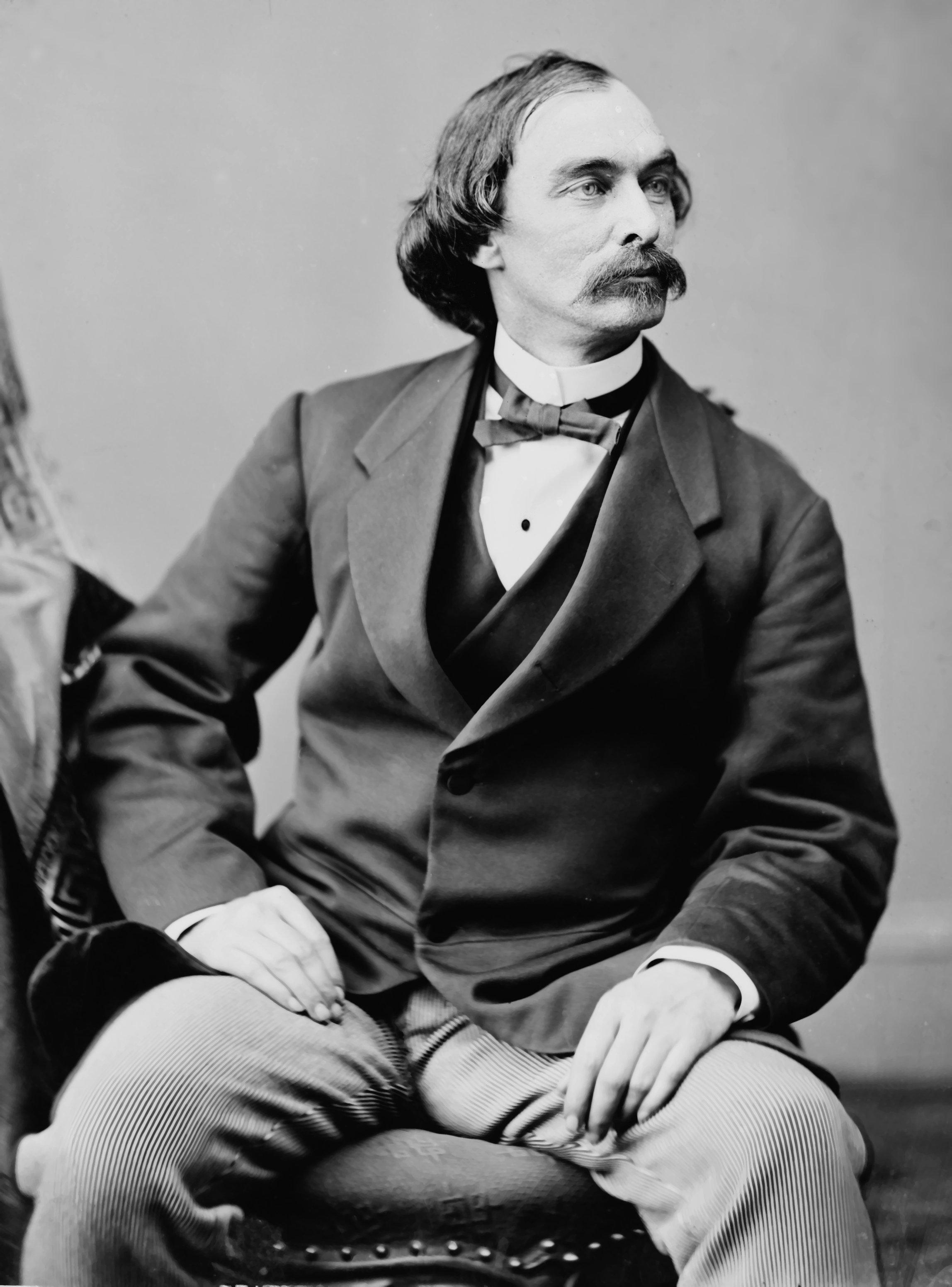
- Hayes between 1860 and 1875
- Born: March 5, 1832; Chester County, Pennsylvania, U.S.
- Died: December 17, 1881 (aged 49); New York City, U.S.
- Occupations: Physician; politician; explorer

Isaac Israel Hayes (March 5, 1832 – December 17, 1881) was an American Arctic explorer, medical doctor, and politician, who was appointed as the commanding officer at Satterlee General Hospital during the American Civil War, and was then elected, after the war, to the New York State Assembly.

His book, The Open Polar Sea: A Narrative of a Voyage of Discovery towards the North Pole, in the Schooner United States, was published in 1867. His other books were Arctic Boat Journey (1860), Cast Away in the Cold (1868), and The Land of Desolation (1872).

== Formative years and Arctic exploration ==
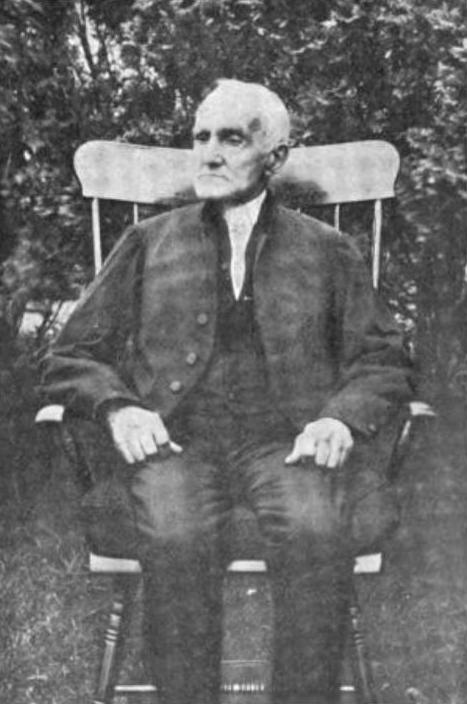
His father, Benjamin Hayes, in 1899

Isaac Israel Hayes was born on March 5, 1832, in Chester County, Pennsylvania, to Benjamin Hayes. He was raised on his family's farm before being sent to the coeducational Westtown School, which had been founded in Chester County in 1799 by the Religious Society of Friends (Quakers). Electing to remain there for two years following his graduation, he became an assistant teacher of civil engineering and mathematics. In 1851, he sought and received admission to the University of Pennsylvania Medical School. After graduating from Penn a year ahead of schedule, he then signed on as ship's surgeon for the Second Grinnell Expedition of 1853–1855. Led by Elisha Kane, the project's members left New York harbor in June 1853 in search of Franklin's lost expedition.

While still engaged with Kane's expedition, Hayes and another team member succeeded in making a round trip exploration of the east coast of Ellesmere Island north of the 79th parallel (79° north). Traveling by sledge, they were able to improve mapping of the area by documenting the features of 200 miles (320 km) of previously uncharted coastline, an effort which helped future Arctic explorers, and reportedly made Hayes the first non-aboriginal explorer of Ellesmere. When Kane announced his plans to extend the expedition for a second winter even though the group's food and fuel were severely depleted, Hayes and seven other team members opted to head south for what they thought would be safety. Instead, they ran out of food and began to eat the only available food source – lichen – until forced to return to Kane's main group, where Hayes then underwent the amputation of three of his frostbitten toes before Kane ordered the group to head to Greenland via sledge and boat. After reaching New York in October 1855 and recuperating from the ordeal, Hayes then embarked on a lecture tour, speaking before audiences at the American Geographical Society and Smithsonian Institution and eventually becoming "the most prolific lecturer and writer on the Arctic in the nineteenth century," according to biographer Douglas Wamsley.

=== American Arctic Expedition ===
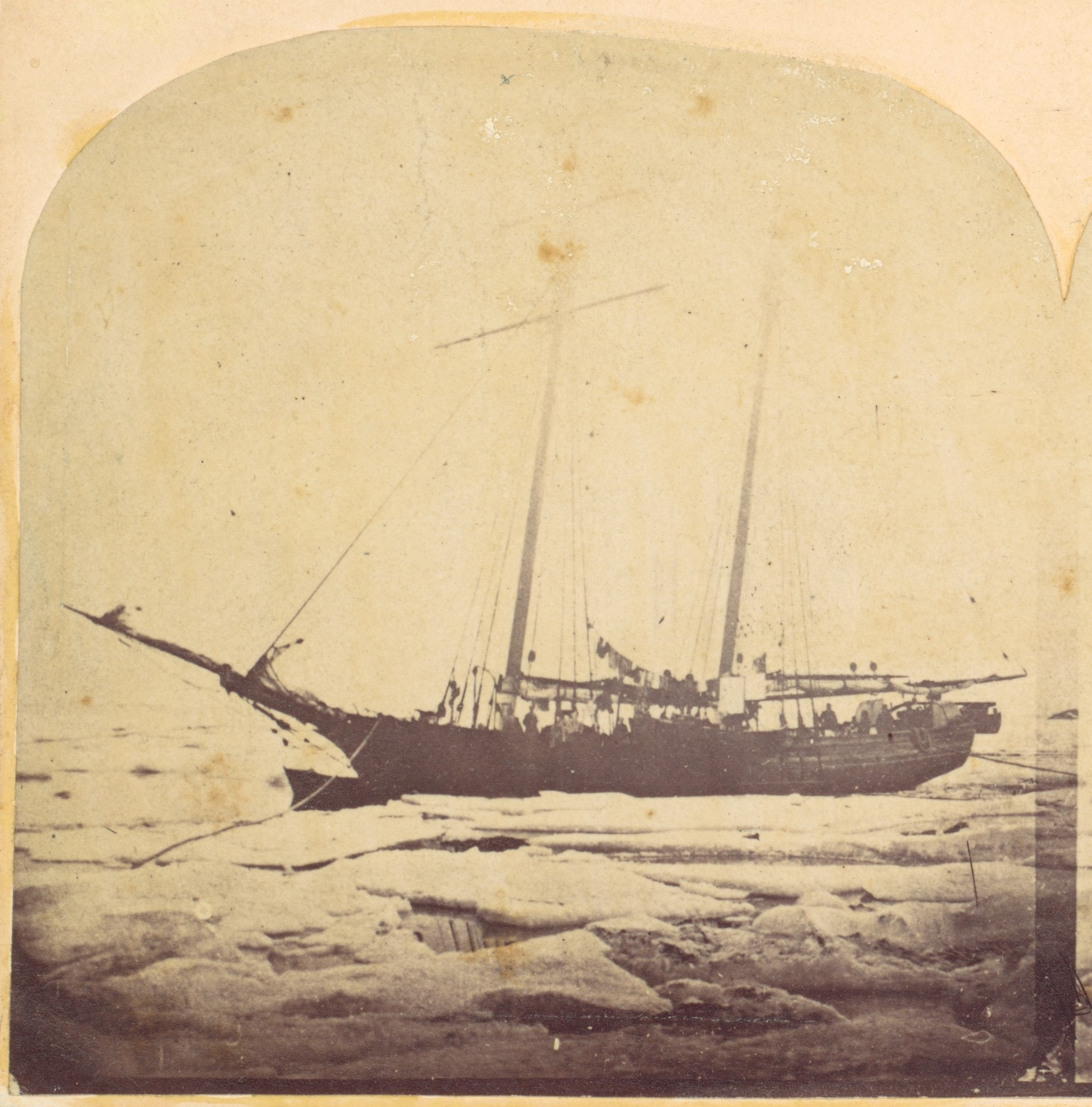
The icebound schooner United States, formerly Spring Hill of Boston

Hayes led his own Arctic expedition from 1860 to 1861 and was able to raise $30,000 for his venture. Departing in June 1860 aboard the United States, he ultimately hoped to reach the North Pole. After arriving in Greenland, he encouraged several indigenous people to join his 20-man party as hunters to ensure that his crew would not be forced to endure the hunger and starvation experienced by previous expeditions. Hayes and his men then set out for Baffin Bay, Smith Sound and Ellesmere Island en route to the supposed Open Polar Sea but, like others before him, was eventually forced by the terrain, harsh climate, and dwindling food supplies to turn back. Taking a measurement with his sextant before making the turnaround, he recorded that he and his men had reached 81°35' north, 70°30' west — which, if his measurement was accurate, would have meant that they had reached the farthest point north to date of any polar expedition. His journal entries did not match the position he had written down in the frigid cold, however, leading subsequent researchers to conclude that he had overestimated his reach by more than 100 miles (160 km), and to speculate that Hayes may have mistakenly noted that his sextant observations of the sun had been taken at noon when they had not or that he had inverted the second digit of the group's farthest lone lower limb to read 56°52′ instead of the true observation 59°52′. According to researchers, the farthest point reached by Hayes was Cape Collinson, less than 10 miles (16 km) north of 80° north, longitude 70°30′ west.

Believing that they had achieved at least some of their objectives, Hayes and his team returned to Greenland. They learned that their nation had descended into Civil War.

== American Civil War ==
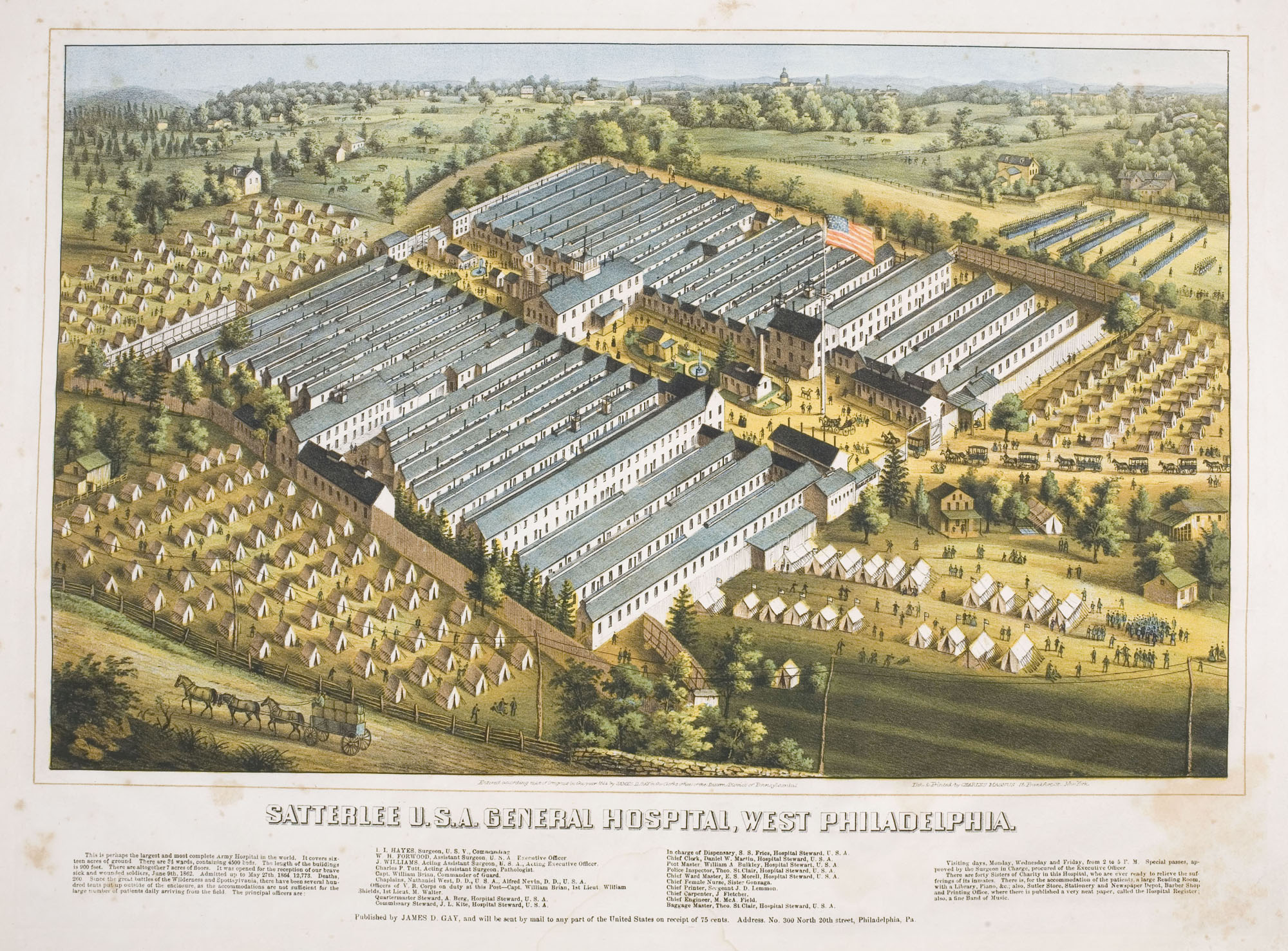
Satterlee General Hospital, West Philadelphia, c. 1864.

After returning to the United States, Hayes enrolled as a surgeon with the Union Army. In 1862, he was placed in command of the Satterlee General Hospital, a sprawling 4,500-bed military hospital in Philadelphia which saw spikes in patients following the Second Battle of Bull Run and Battle of Gettysburg, the latter of which was responsible for "swelling the hospital population to more than 6,000" after "the greatest number of wounded were admitted to the hospital in a single month" during the summer of 1863.

While this hospital was open, Hayes and his staff rendered care to as many as 50,000 sick and wounded. Despite the high volume of patients and the relatively rudimentary medical science of the time, only 260 patients at Satterlee died between the hospital's opening and closure.

== Post-war life ==
After the war, Hayes penned a book about his expedition days, The Open Polar Sea: A Narrative of a Voyage of Discovery towards the North Pole, in the Schooner United States. He then followed up with the publication of other work, including 1869's Cast Away in the Cold. On November 23, 1874, a reception was held in Hayes' honor at the Arcadian Club during which General Roy Stone spoke about Hayes' accomplishments. In 1863, Hayes was elected as a member to the American Philosophical Society.

=== Publications ===
- Hayes, Isaac Israel. The Open Polar Sea: A Narrative of a Voyage of Discovery towards the North Pole, in the Schooner United States." Cambridge, United Kingdom: Cambridge University Press, 2013 (original publication year: 1867). ISBN 978-1-1392-3636-2
- Hayes, I. I. Cast Away in the Cold. Gloucester, Gloucestershire, United Kingdom: Dodo Press, 2009 (original publication year: 1869). ISBN 978-1-4099-5850-5

=== Service in the New York State Assembly ===
Hayes then ran for, and was elected to the New York State Assembly. Representing New York City as a Republican from 1876 until 1881, he worked to improve the quality of life for poor and mentally ill members of society, and joined his fellow State Assembly members, the Hon. Harvey J. Hurd of Erie, and the Hon. Thomas J. Alvord of Onondaga, in proposing an amendment to the New York State Constitution on February 27, 1878, to abolish canal tolls as a way of facilitating business growth and general prosperity in the region.

An "anti-Tammany Hall Republican," he also secured the support of his colleagues in funding construction of a tunnel beneath the Hudson River. When completed more than a decade later as the Hudson River Tunnel, this significantly improved the efficiency of East Coast transportation by linking Manhattan Island to New Jersey.

=== Death and interment ===
On Friday evening, December 18, 1881, while still a sitting member of the State Assembly, the 49-year-old Hayes suffered a heart attack at his home in New York City. He died the following morning.

== Honors ==
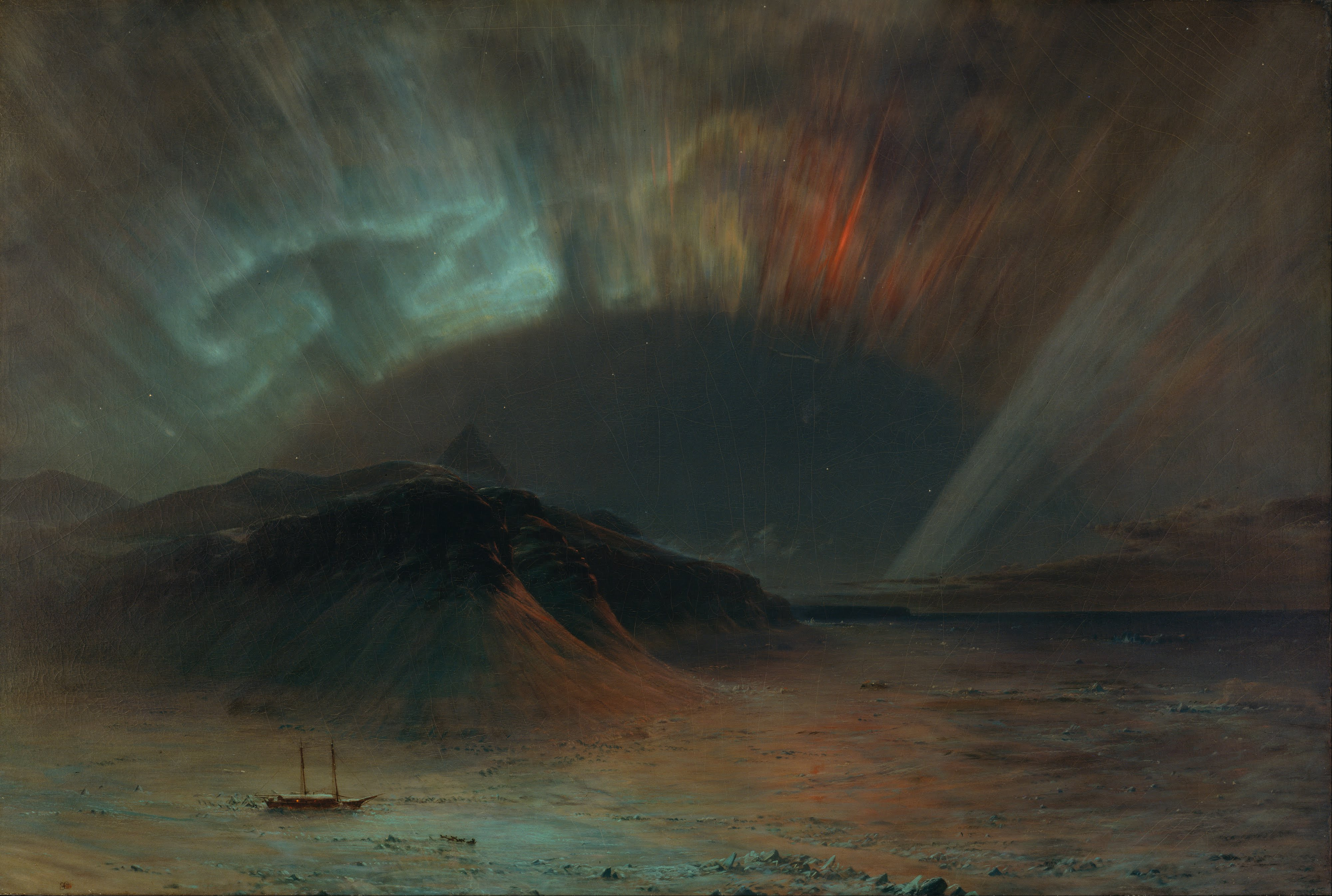
Aurora Borealis, by Frederic Edwin Church

In 1865, Hayes' expedition was memorialized in Frederic Edwin Church's painting Aurora Borealis. During his expedition, Hayes had named a 2,540-foot (770 m) peak at 81°16'N, 65°35'W "Church's Peak" after his friend Church, and gave his own sketch of it (now in the collection of Olana State Historic Site) to the artist; Church used it as a reference for the peak that appears in his Aurora Borealis, and painted Hayes' ship United States in the foreground. Church also produced a portrait oil sketch of Oosisoak, Hayes' lead sled dog, in 1861 (now in a private collection).

In addition to Hayes' commemoration of his expedition by naming the range on Canada's Ellesmere Island after his ship, the United States, one of Russia's Franz Josef Land's islands, Heiss Island (a German cartographer's transliteration of Hayes Island) was also named in his honor.

New York State Assembly
Preceded by Frederick W. Seward	New York State Assembly; New York County, 7th District; 1876–1881	Succeeded by Lucas L. Van Allen
