= Edward M. Lander =

First Chief Justice of Washington Territory and Indiana Politician

The Honorable Lieutenant Colonel Edward M. Lander
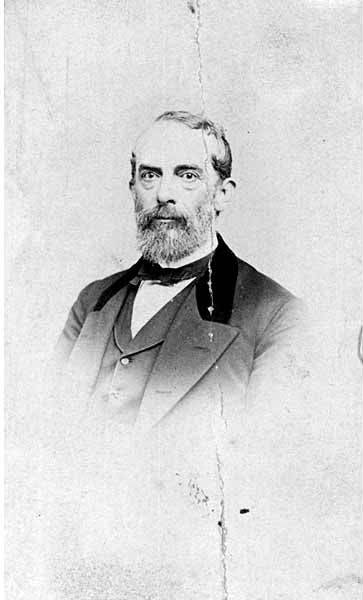
- Lander c.1864

Chief Justice of Washington Territory
- In office 1853–1857
- Preceded by: Position established
- Succeeded by: Obadiah B. McFadden

Prosecutor for the 5th Judicial District of Indiana
- In office 1847–1849
- Preceded by: Abram A. Hammond
- Succeeded by: David S. Gooding

Personal details
- Born: Edward M. Lander Jr. August 11, 1816 Salem, Massachusetts
- Died: February 2, 1907 (aged 90) Washington D.C.
- Resting place: Arlington National Cemetery
- Other political affiliations: Democratic
- Relations: Frederick W. Lander (brother); Louisa Lander (sister); Elias Hasket Derby (great-grandfather)
- Education: Harvard University

Military service
- Allegiance: United States of America
- Branch/service: United States Army; United States Militia
- Years of service: 1847–1848
- Rank: Captain; Lieutenant Colonel
- Unit: 4th Indiana Infantry Regiment
- Commands: Company D, 4th Indiana Infantry Regiment
- Battles/wars: Mexican-American War: Siege of Veracruz; Siege of Puebla (1847); Battle of Huamantla; Action of Atlixco; Skirmish at Matamoros; Affair at Galaxara Pass; Yakima War

Edward M. Lander Jr. (August 11, 1816 – February 2, 1907) was a politician, military officer, lawyer, judge, and the first Chief Justice of Washington Territory. Lander was later a foundational figure alongside Arthur A. Denny, Daniel Bagley, and Charles C. Terry in founding the University of Washington.

== Early life ==
Edward M. Lander was born on August 11, 1816, in Salem, Massachusetts. He was the son of Captain Edward Lander Sr. and Eliza West. Lander had five total siblings, two brothers: Frederick W. Lander and Charles Henry Lander, and three sisters: Louisa Lander, Martha Lander, and Eliza Lander. Like his siblings, Lander was the great-grandson of Elias Hasket Derby, a famous Massachusetts merchant and privateer during the American Revolutionary War. In 1835 Lander attended Harvard University where he studied law. Lander was later admitted to the bar in Massachusetts in 1839 and opened a law firm in Salem.

== Indiana ==
In 1841 Lander moved to Indiana where he worked as an attorney. In 1846 Lander was elected to the office of Prosecutor for the 5th Judicial Circuit Court of Indiana, Lander's predecessor was Indiana politician Abram A. Hammond. The 5th Judicial Circuit Court of Indiana included the jurisdiction of Boone, Hamilton, Hancock, Hendricks, and Johnson Counties. Lander would ultimate serve as prosecutor from January 29, 1847, until January 29, 1849, before being succeeded by David S. Gooding.

== Mexican–American War ==
Lander served in the Mexican–American War from 1847 to 1848 as the Captain of Company D in the 4th Indiana Volunteers under the command of fellow Indiana lawyer and politician Colonel Willis A. Gorman. Company D of the 4th Indiana Volunteers was nicknamed the "Marion County Volunteers" or the "Marion Volunteers" as many of the volunteer recruits came exclusively from Marion County and Indianapolis. According to the book Indiana in the Mexican War by Indiana Adjutant General Oran D. Perry, Lander had recruited his company in-full by May 22, 1847. The officers of Lander's company included himself as captain, Abraham Lewis as his First Lieutenant, Benjamin Franklin as Second Lieutenant, and Benjamin Philbean as Second Lieutenant.

During the course of the war 4th Indiana Volunteers fought at the Siege of Veracruz, the Siege of Puebla, the Battle of Huamantla, the Action of Atlixco, the Skirmish at Matamoros, and the Affair at Galaxara Pass under Indiana politician Joseph Lane.

== Political career ==
Following the war Lander continued to serve as Prosecutor for the 5th Judicial Circuit Court of Indiana. Lander was also the appointed as the secretary of the Officers and Soldiers of the War of 1812 and the Mexican American War, a veterans organization. In 1851 Lander was elected as the Judge of the Marion county Court of Common Pleas against his opponent James T. Morrison.

On March 2, 1853, at the suggestion of Washington's Territorial Governor Isaac Stevens, President of the United States Franklin Pierce appointed Lander, along with John K. Miller of Ohio as the first Chief justice and Associate Justice of the newly formed Washington Territory. After suffering a stroke, Miller declined the position and instead appointed Moses Hoagland, also of Ohio, who also declined to serve as the territory's Associate Justice. Ultimately, Victor Monroe of Kentucky and Obadiah B. McFadden of Pennsylvania would end up serving as Associate Justices under Lander.

Besides being the Chief Justice, Lander was also the Judge of the 3rd District Court of Washington Territory which included Pierce, King, Island, Jefferson, Clallam, and Whatcom Counties. While in Washington Lander also held the rank of Lieutenant Colonel in the local militia in Georgetown, Seattle.

=== 1856 arrest ===
During the Yakima War the Territorial Governor of Washington, Isaac Stevens, suspected local farmers of supplying the Yakama people with weapons and provisions. Stevens ordered the farmers to abandon their homes near the Nisqually Valley and relocate to Fort Steilacoom, Olympia, Washington, or Fort Nisqually where they could be monitored and protected. The farmers refused to do so and thus Stevens declared martial law and arrested the farmers. The local farmers who had been arrested petitioned the Associate Justice of Washington Territory, Francis A. Chenoweth, for Writs Of Habeas Corpus in order to protect them from unlawful detention at Fort Steilacoom under Stevens. Chenoweth, however, was at home sick but was still able to issue each of the prisoners their writs.

On May 12, 1856, Lander was arrested and ejected from court by Colonel Benjamin F. Shaw (1829–1908) and members of the Washington Militia. Lander had openly opposed Stevens martial law and policies for some time and had continued to his duties despite Stevens proclamation. Lander was released from custody at Camp Montgomery a day later on May 13. Stevens attempted to create a court-martial so he could try the farmers, however, Stevens' fellow officers argued that they did not hold jurisdiction over them and were thus released. After the prisoners release Lander sought and summoned Stevens for contempt of court and the unlawful use of military force on a civilian court outside of his own jurisdiction. Stevens was eventually fined for $50 for this offense and was ridiculed within Washington Territorial Legislature. Lander later decline to run for the office of Chief Justice for a second term. Lander was succeeded as Chief Justice of Washington Territory in 1857 by Obadiah B. McFadden who had been appointed by James Buchanan.

== University of Washington ==
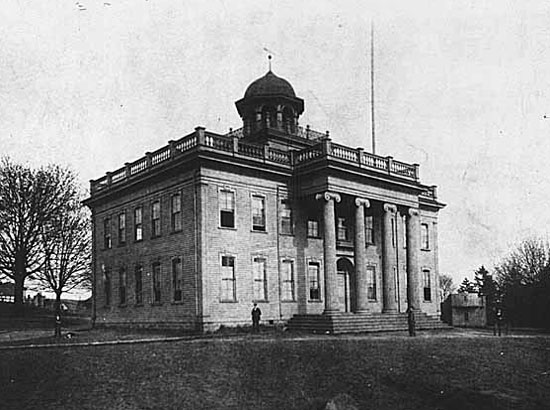
The original University of Washington building, c. 1870

In 1861 Lander along with Arthur A. Denny, Daniel Bagley, and Charles C. Terry founded the Territorial University which would later become the University of Washington. Lander and Terry donated a combined total of two acres of land alongside Denny's 8 acres for a grand total of 10 acres for the original Territorial University's campus. The site of the old university building is now part of the larger Metropolitan Tract in downtown Seattle.

== Later life ==
Lander later moved to Washington D.C. where he became involved in the Harvard Club of Washington DC and the Aztec Club of 1847. As a lifelong bachelor, Lander was never married and did not have children. Lander died on February 2, 1907, in Washington, D.C.. A funeral was held for lander on February 4, 1907, at the All Souls Church, Unitarian in Washington, D.C. which was attended by many United States dignitaries. Lander is buried in Arlington National Cemetery in Section 3 Site 1528.

== Legacy ==
Lander Street in Alki Point, Seattle is named after Lander, as well as Terry and Lander Halls at the University of Washington. Lander's family papers are held in the collection of the Online Archive of California via the University of California.
