= The Rocky Mountains, Lander's Peak =

1863 oil painting by Albert Bierstadt

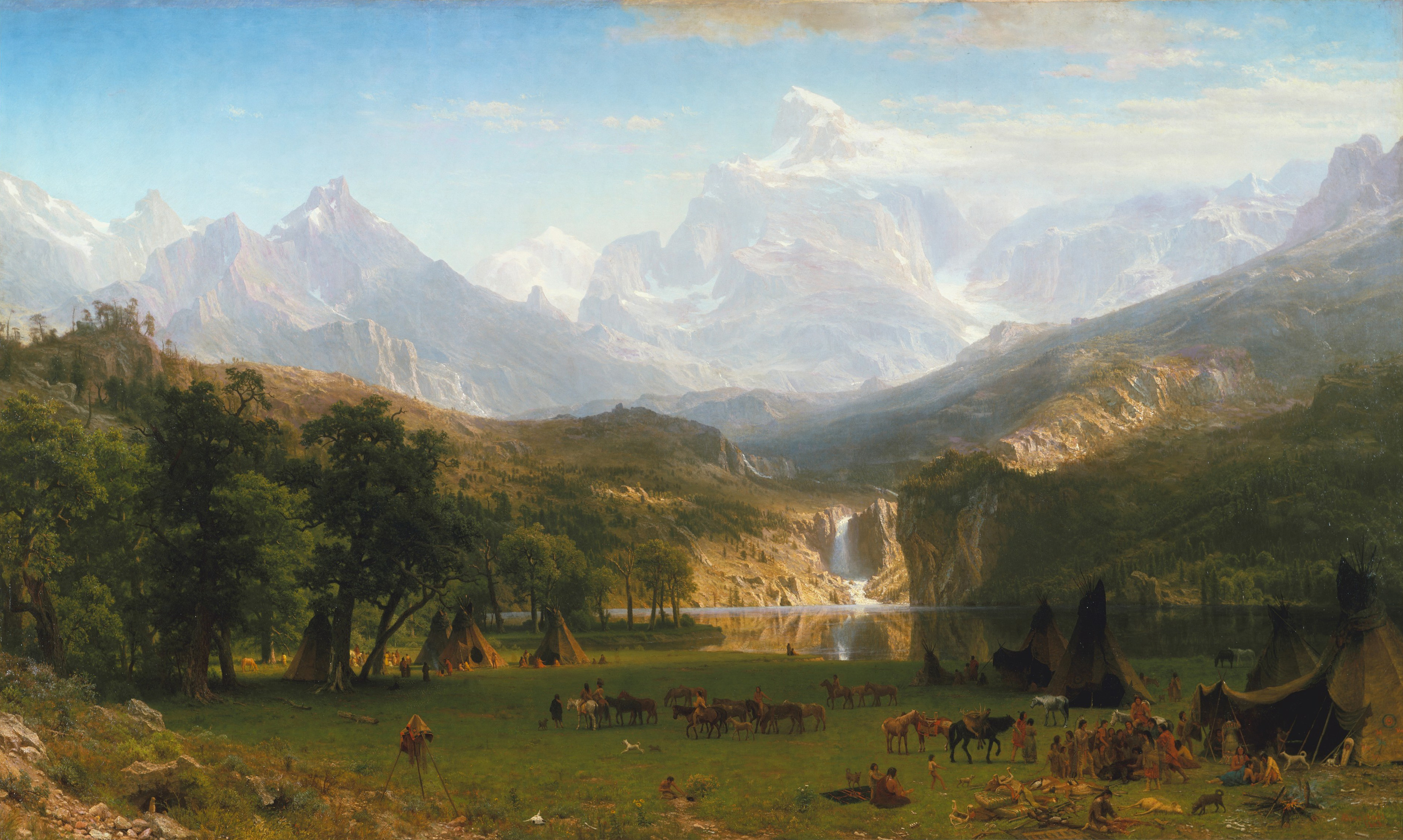
- Artist: Albert Bierstadt
- Year: 1863
- Medium: Oil on canvas
- Dimensions: 186.7 cm × 306.7 cm (73.5 in × 120.75 in)
- Location: Metropolitan Museum of Art; New York City

The Rocky Mountains, Lander's Peak is an 1863 landscape oil painting by the German-American painter Albert Bierstadt. It is based on sketches made during Bierstadt's travels with Frederick W. Lander's Honey Road Survey Party in 1859. The painting shows Lander's Peak in the Wyoming Range of the Rocky Mountains, with an encampment of Native Americans in the foreground. It has been compared to, and exhibited with, The Heart of the Andes by Frederic Edwin Church. Lander's Peak immediately became a critical and popular success and sold in 1865 for $25,000.

== Background ==
Hudson River School landscape painter Albert Bierstadt (1830–1902) was born in Germany, and, though his family moved to New Bedford, Massachusetts, when he was two, he spent many of his formative years in Europe. He made his debut in an 1858 exhibition, but his breakthrough came in the aftermath of a journey he made the following year. In the spring of 1859, Bierstadt joined the Honey Road Survey Party led by then-colonel Frederick W. Lander. Bierstadt traveled as far as the Wyoming Range in the Rocky Mountains and made studies for numerous paintings along the way. Bierstadt was greatly impressed by the landscape he encountered and described the Rocky Mountains as "the best material for the artist in the world." Bierstadt habitually extensively prepared for his work, making as many as fifty sketches for a single painting. In 1860, he exhibited Base of the Rocky Mountains, Laramie Peak at the National Academy of Design. His greatest success, however, came with The Rocky Mountains, Lander's Peak, which he exhibited in 1863 at the Tenth Street Studio Building, where he also had a studio.

== Composition and theme ==
The painting shows Lander's Peak, a mountain with a summit of 10,456 feet (3,187 m) in the Wyoming Range in modern-day Wyoming. The peak was named after Frederick W. Lander on Bierstadt's initiative, after Lander's death in the Civil War. In one description of the painting, "Sharply pointed granite peaks and fantastically illuminated clouds float above a tranquil, wooded genre scene." The foreground is dominated by the campsite of a tribe of Native Americans. The landscape in the painting is not the actual landscape as it appears at Lander's Peak but rather an ideal landscape based on nature, altered by Bierstadt for dramatic effect.

Bierstadt's painting hit a nerve with contemporary Americans by portraying the grandeur and pristine beauty of the nation's western wilderness. It was a reference to the idea of Manifest Destiny, where the Rocky Mountains represented both natural beauty and an obstacle to westward expansion. In the words of historian Anne F. Hyde: "Bierstadt painted the West as Americans hoped it would be, which made his paintings vastly popular and reinforced the perception of the West as either Europe or sublime Eden." At the same time, the Native Americans in the foreground gave the scene authenticity and presented it as a timeless place, untouched by European hands.

== Depiction of Shoshone Peoples ==
Bierstadt paints a band of Shoshone Native peoples at the forefront of the painting. According to a review in Harper's Weekly from March 26, 1864, Lander's Peak "is purely an American scene, and from the faithful and elaborate delineation of the Indian village, a form of life now rapidly disappearing from the earth, may be called a historic landscape." Bierstadt illustrated Shoshone people along with the majestic peaks as a marker of the "sublime" which authors like James Fenimore Cooper, John C. Frémont, and Washington Irving wrote about. Bierstadt does not include who these people are in his painting title. Unlike Catlin, Bierstadt did not focus on the individuality of members of the Shoshone people. Rather, his focus was on their relationship with the landscape. As Bierstadt scholar Matthew Biagell suggests, "He placed them, as he placed European peasants in earlier works, in the middle distance so that we witness their presence in a landscape setting rather than focus on their movements."

In 1859, Eastern Shoshone peoples lived in the region now called Western Wyoming. Bierstadt commented on the Shoshone people he saw in a letter from July 10, 1859, which The Crayon, an art magazine, published in September 1859. "The manners and customs of the Indians are still as they were hundreds of years ago, and now is the time to paint them, for they are rapidly passing away, and soon will be known only in history. I think that the artist ought to tell his portion of their history as well as the writer; a combination of both will assuredly render it more complete" Bierstadt adds, "We have a great many Indian subjects. We were quite fortunate in getting them, the natives not being very willing to have the brass tube pointed at them. Of course they were astonished when we showed them the pictures they did not sit for; and the best we have taken have been obtained without the knowledge of the parties, which is, in fact the best way to take any portrait" The Shoshone people are depicted on a similar level as the nature of the image. Bierstadt is attempting to capture an image of them and the Rockies, something which he believes must be preserved as a part of history.

== Reception ==
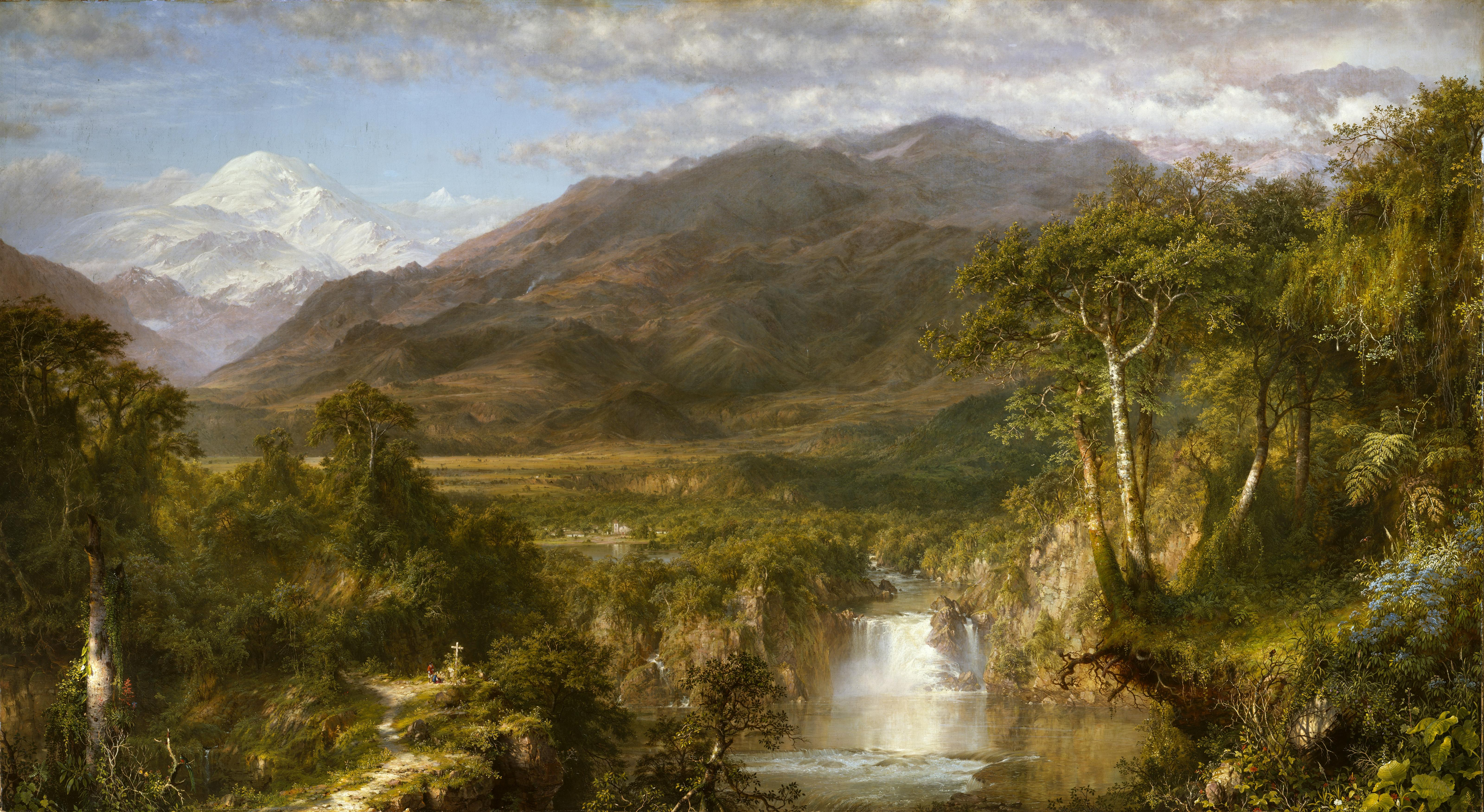
Lander's Peak has often been compared to Frederic Edwin Church's The Heart of the Andes

Lander's Peak was an immediate success; twelve hundred people were invited to the exhibition, and almost a thousand showed up. Bierstadt was a shrewd self-promoter and a gifted artist, and this was the first of his paintings to be widely promoted with a single-picture exhibition accompanied by a pamphlet, engravings, and a tour. The painting, with its ten-foot width, was intended both for exhibition halls and the homes of America's emergent millionaire class. In 1865, British railway entrepreneur James McHenry purchased the work for $25,000, the most paid for an American painting to that point. Bierstadt later repurchased it, and gave or sold it to his brother Edward, before it was eventually acquired for the Metropolitan Museum of Art in New York in 1907.

Comparisons were made between Lander's Peak and The Heart of the Andes, a contemporary painting by one of Bierstadt's main rivals in the landscape genre, Frederic Edwin Church. The two works represented the two great mountain ranges spanning North and South America. At the New York Metropolitan Fair in 1864, held by the United States Sanitary Commission to raise money for the Union war effort, the two paintings were exhibited opposite each other. Lander's Peak and The Heart of the Andes are still exhibited on opposite walls at their current location at the Metropolitan.

Most reviews of the painting were positive; one review called it "beyond question one of the finest landscapes ever painted in this country", adding, "Its artistic merits are in some respects unrivaled: and added to these it has the advantage of being a representative painting of a portion of the most sublime and beautiful scenery on the American Continent." The painting won a prize at the Exposition Universelle in Paris in 1867. At the same time, there were also critical voices; in particular, some American Pre-Raphaelites found his brushwork wanting. One such critic complained that it would have been better "if the marks of the brush had, by dexterous handling, been made to stand for scrap and fissure, crag and cranny, but as it is, we have only too little geology and too much bristle."

== See also ==
- List of works by Albert Bierstadt
