= Charles C. Terry =

Seattle businessman and pioneer

Charles Carroll Terry
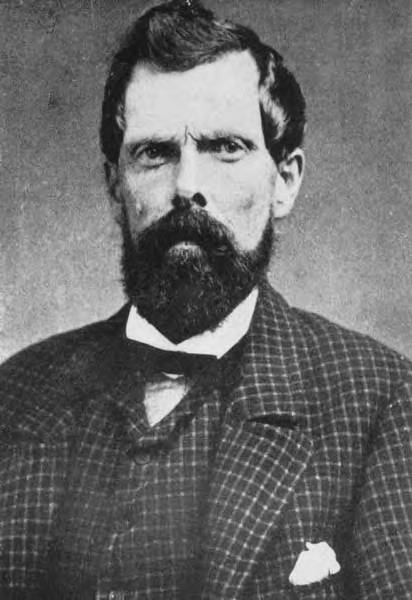
- Terry c.1860's
- Born: 1830; Sangerfield, New York
- Died: February 17, 1867 (aged 36–37); Seattle, Washington
- Occupations: Trader; Ship builder
- Known for: Member of the Denny Party; Founding citizen of Seattle; Founder of the University of Washington
- Spouse: Mary Jane Russell
- Children: 5
- Parent(s): Horace Terry; Betsey Chambers
- Relatives: Lander "Lee" Terry (brother)

Charles Carroll Terry (c.1830 - February 17, 1867), sometimes written as C. C. Terry, was a merchant, ship builder, and one of the first settlers of Elliott Bay in Seattle in Oregon Territory, later part of Washington Territory. Terry and his brother, Leander Terry, were both part of the Denny Party which founded the modern-day city of Seattle in 1851. During his lifetime Terry became one of the richest men in Washington Territory, as well as being one of the founding members of the University of Washington.

== Early life and family ==
Charles Carroll Terry was born in 1830 in Sangerfield near Waterville, New York. Terry was the son of Horace Terry (1787-1871) and Betsey Chambers(1789-1853), he was part of the larger Terry family of Enfield, Connecticut. Terry was educated at the common school in Sangerfield and had a total of eight siblings, Terry being the youngest.

== Oregon and Washington Territory ==
Terry joined his elder brother Leander "Lee" Terry in 1849 on an expedition to Oregon Territory, however, Terry did not travel to the West Coast via the Oregon Trail at Fort Laramie. Instead, Terry and Leander chose to sail around Cape Horn and travel to Oregon Territory overland through California via the port of San Francisco. While in California, Terry became a trader in Willamette Valley where he opened a general store and was a successful small business owner.

=== Founding Seattle ===
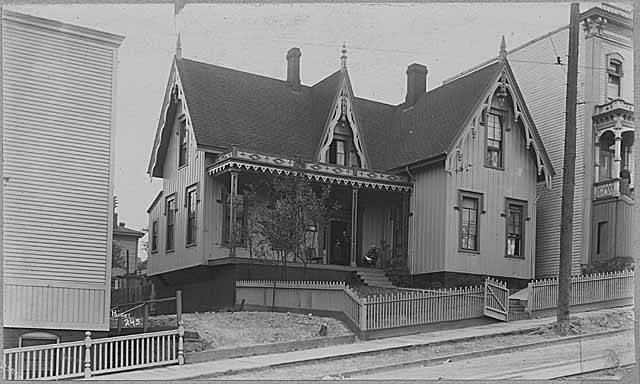
Charles Terry residence, Seattle c.1865

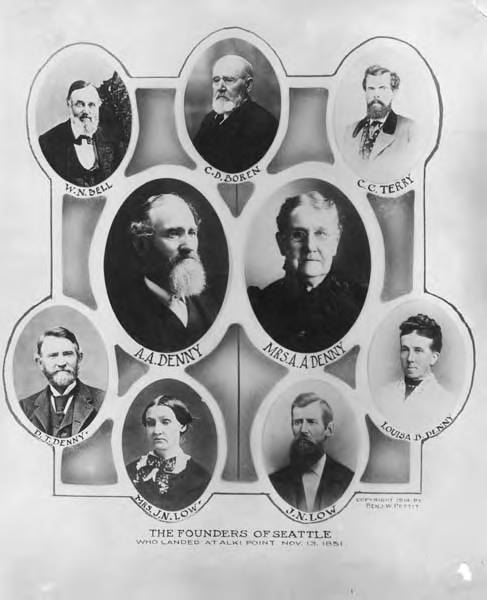
Founders of Seattle from the Denny Party via the University of Washington Special Collections

Terry first arrived in Oregon Territory on November 10, 1850 which entitled Terry to approximately 320 acres according to the Donation Land Claim Act of 1850. Terry did not land in Portland, Oregon however until 1851. While in Portland, Terry met Arthur A. Denny, a fellow businessman and settler to the territory. Denny planned to settle land near Elliott Bay and eventually formed a group of likeminded settlers called the Denny Party in 1851. On November 13, 1851 Terry, along with John N. Low, Carson Boren, and William Nathaniel Bell and their families landed at Alki Point, Seattle.

Terry settled what is now Alki Point at Puget Sound where he built a store. In 1853, John N. Low sold all his property to Terry, Terry thus became the sole owner of Alki Point. On April 18, 1855, Terry and Edward M. Lander purchased land from Carson Boren's land claim, Terry also exchanged land with Doc Maynard at Alki Point in 1857. While first settling Seattle Terry and the rest of the Denny Party realized that much of the area would be profitable for the lumber trade and wood industry and thus started felling trees in the region in order to sell lumber in San Francisco following the San Francisco Fire of 1851. In 1853, Captain William Renton and Terry built a gristmill at Alki Point, however, due to the wind and inclement weather of the area the mill was later moved to Port Orchard, Washington where Renton operated the mill until 1862 when it was sold to the Colman and Falk company.

=== University of Washington ===
In June 1861, Terry, alongside Edward M. Lander, Arthur A. Denny, Dexter Horton, and Daniel Bagley among others, helped to found the University of Washington. Terry and others had compiled a total of 10 acres of land in order to donate it for the school's campus. Terry donating 2 of the 10 acres. The University of Washington (then called the Territorial University), first opened on November 4, 1861 with Asa Mercer as the university's first president.

=== Businesses ===
Terry was involved in a variety of businesses and companies while living in Seattle, primarily railroads, including the Puget Sound and Columbia River Railroad Company and the Seattle and Squak Railroad Company. Terry also lobbied the Washington State Legislature for funds to form the Seattle Water Company.

== Personal life and death ==
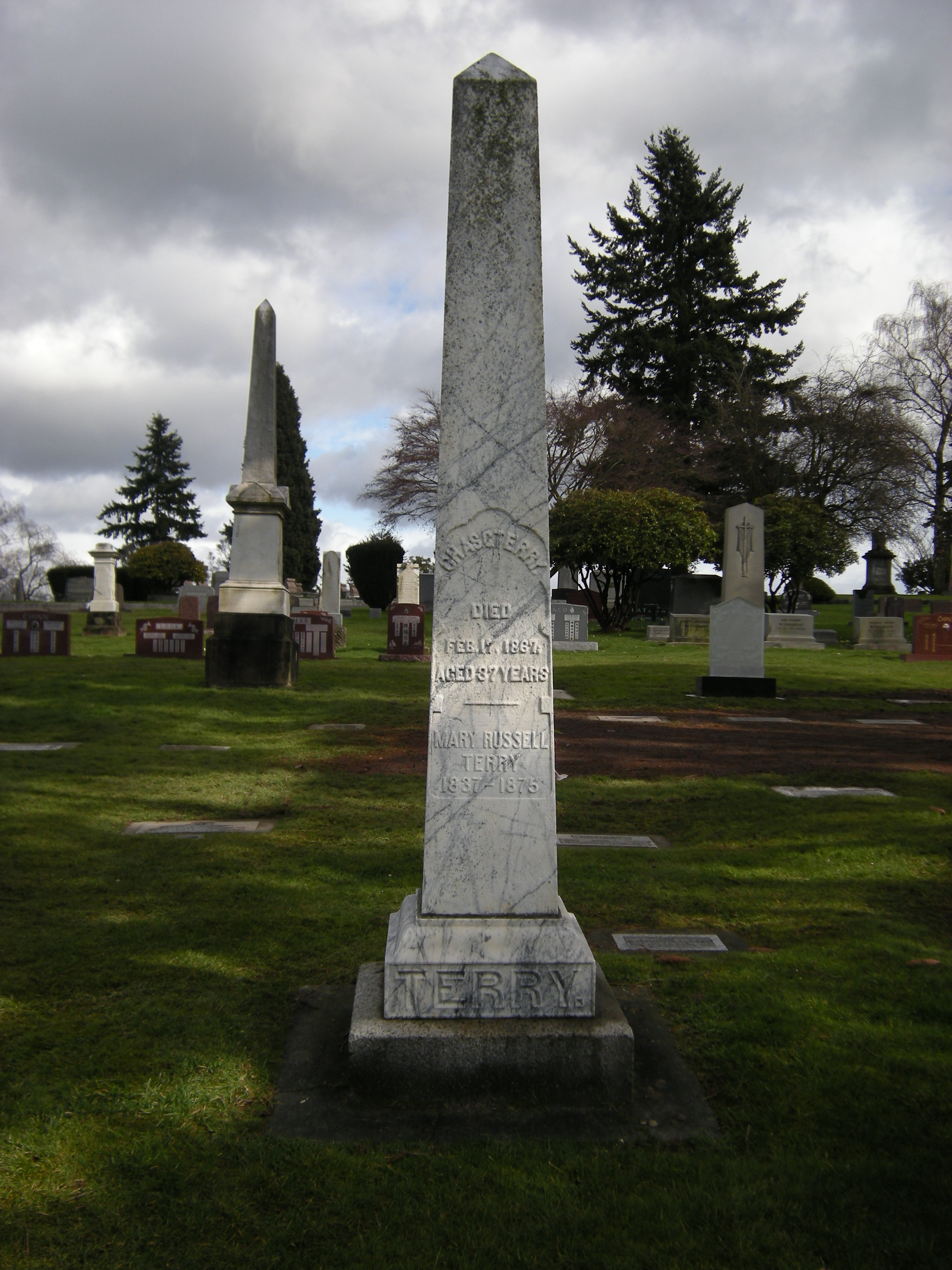
Terry's grave marker at Lake View Cemetery

In July 1856, Terry married Mary Jane Russell, one of the few single women in Oregon Territory. Together the Terry's had a total of five children. Terry died of "consumption" (Tuberculosis) on February 17, 1867, at the age of 37.

== Legacy ==
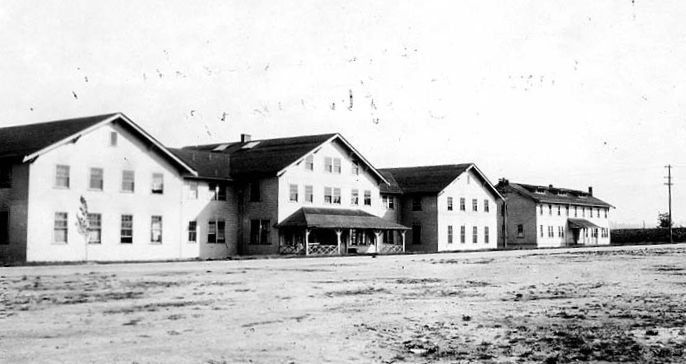
Lander Hall and Terry Hall, men's dormitories, University of Washington, Seattle, c. 1922

Terry and Lander Halls are named after both Terry and Edward M. Lander for their contributions towards the early history of the University of Washington. The original Terry Hall and Lander Hall were both erected in 1917 for use by the United States Navy stationed nearby. The dormitories themselves were constructed by the Bremerton Naval Yard and later used for general accommodation for male students at the University of Washington.

Terry Street in Seattle and Terry Avenue near University Street in Seattle are named after Terry.
