= William M. Chase, N. A. =

Painting by John Singer Sargent

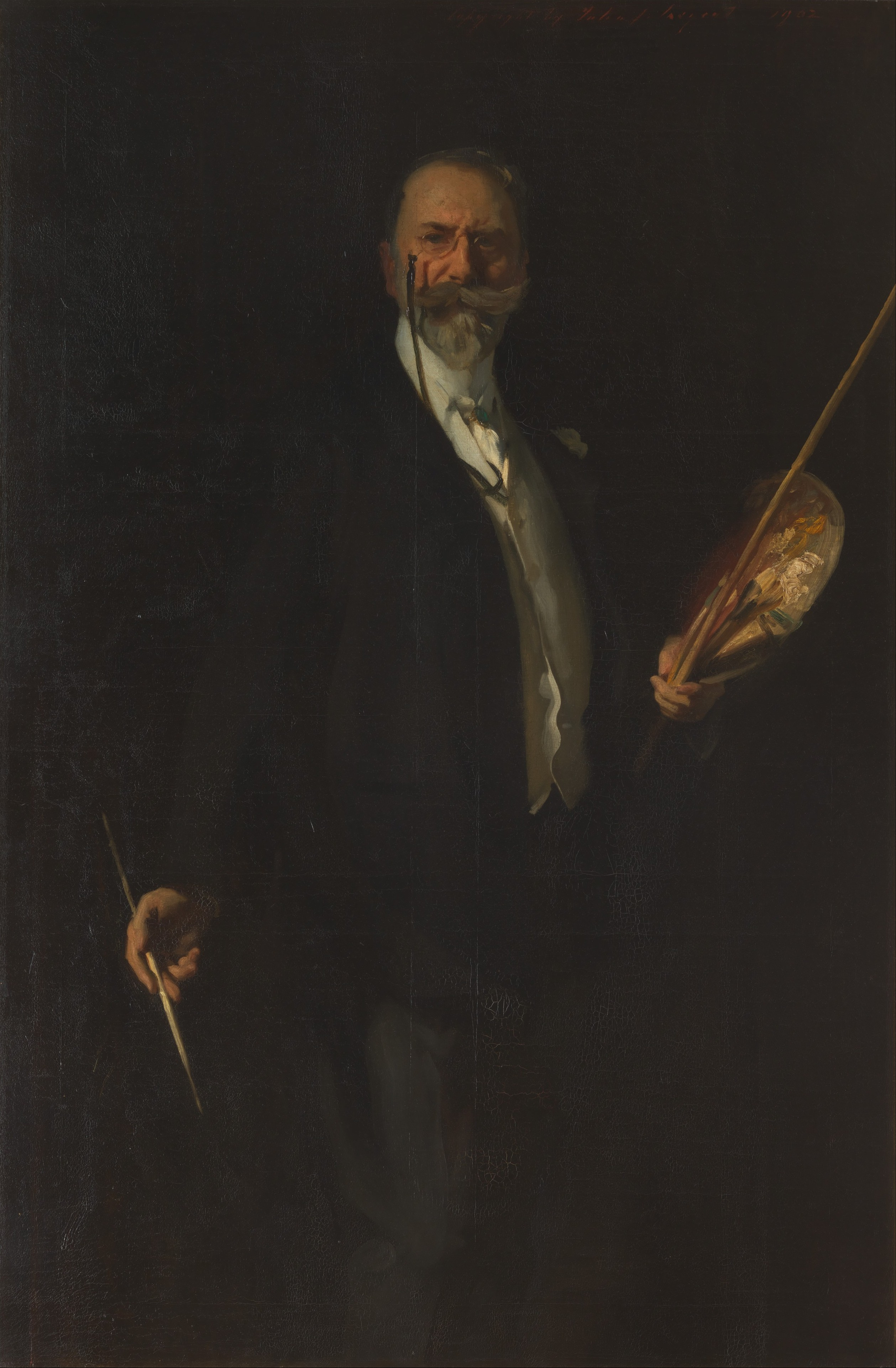
- Artist: John Singer Sargent
- Year: 1902
- Type: Oil on canvas
- Subject: William Merritt Chase
- Dimensions: 158.8 cm × 105.1 cm (62.5 in × 41.4 in)
- Location: Metropolitan Museum of Art, New York
- Accession: 05.33

William M. Chase, N. A. is a 1902 oil painting by John Singer Sargent depicting his fellow American painter William Merritt Chase. It is in the collection of the Metropolitan Museum of Art in New York, where it was donated in 1905 by a group of Chase's students who had commissioned the work. The postnominal "N. A." in the title indicates Chase's election as a National Academician of New York's National Academy of Design.

== Background ==
=== The artists' friendship ===
Chase and Sargent first met in Europe in 1881 and became lifelong friends. Both painters were among the leading figures of American art in the late nineteenth century, though their careers took different shapes: Sargent became the preeminent society portraitist on both sides of the Atlantic, while Chase was celebrated equally as an Impressionist painter and as one of the most influential art teachers of his generation. Chase founded the Chase School of Art (later the Parsons School of Design) and taught at the Art Students League of New York, the Pennsylvania Academy of the Fine Arts, and the Art Institute of Chicago; his students included Georgia O'Keeffe, Edward Hopper, George Bellows, Rockwell Kent, and Joseph Stella.

The two artists had earlier collaborated in 1890, when Sargent arranged to stage a performance by the Spanish dancer La Carmencita at Chase's Tenth Street studio in New York so that both painters could work from the same model. Chase was an admirer of Sargent's work, and by the turn of the century he was regarded alongside Sargent as one of the foremost American portrait painters.

=== Commission ===
In 1902, a group of Chase's students commissioned Sargent to paint a portrait of their teacher, intending to donate it to the Metropolitan Museum of Art in Chase's honor. Chase was at the height of his reputation: he had directed the Shinnecock Hills Summer School of Art on Long Island from 1891 to 1902 and was widely recognized as one of the most beloved art instructors in the country. The portrait was painted in Sargent's London studio during a visit by Chase to England.

== Description ==
The painting depicts Chase standing in a three-quarter-length pose against a dark, neutral background. He holds a palette and paintbrushes in his left hand and a poised brush in his right, as though he has paused in the midst of painting to scrutinize his canvas. Chase wears what he called his "old blue studio coat," which Sargent insisted he put on instead of the formal frock coat that Chase preferred. A carnation is visible in his buttonhole, and his assured, upright stance projects an air of confidence and professionalism.

The choice of working attire over formal dress was deliberate on Sargent's part, presenting Chase in his identity as a practicing painter rather than simply as a gentleman. The Metropolitan Museum's catalogue description notes that Chase's "working attire, palette, poised brush, and assured stance suggest his dual persona as a painter and a gentleman."

== Exhibition and provenance ==
After the portrait was completed, Chase's students needed to raise the funds to pay Sargent's fee. They did so by exhibiting the painting in New York, Philadelphia, and Chicago before presenting it to the Metropolitan Museum. The painting entered the museum's collection in 1905 as a gift from the pupils of Chase (accession number 05.33).

== Analysis ==
A 2023 master's thesis at American University examined the painting in the context of the growing competition between portrait painting and photography at the turn of the twentieth century. The thesis argues that by depicting Chase engaged in the mental and perceptive work of observation—staring intently at the viewer rather than actively applying paint—Sargent emphasized the intellectual labor involved in portrait painting, thereby asserting its value over the increasingly popular mechanical medium of photography. As a work commissioned specifically for the Metropolitan Museum, the preeminent art institution in the United States, the portrait also allowed Sargent to align with the museum's implicit interest in connoisseurship and the value of original works of art.

== See also ==
- 1902 in art
- List of works by John Singer Sargent
- William Merritt Chase
