= The Heart of the Andes =

Painting by Frederic Edwin Church

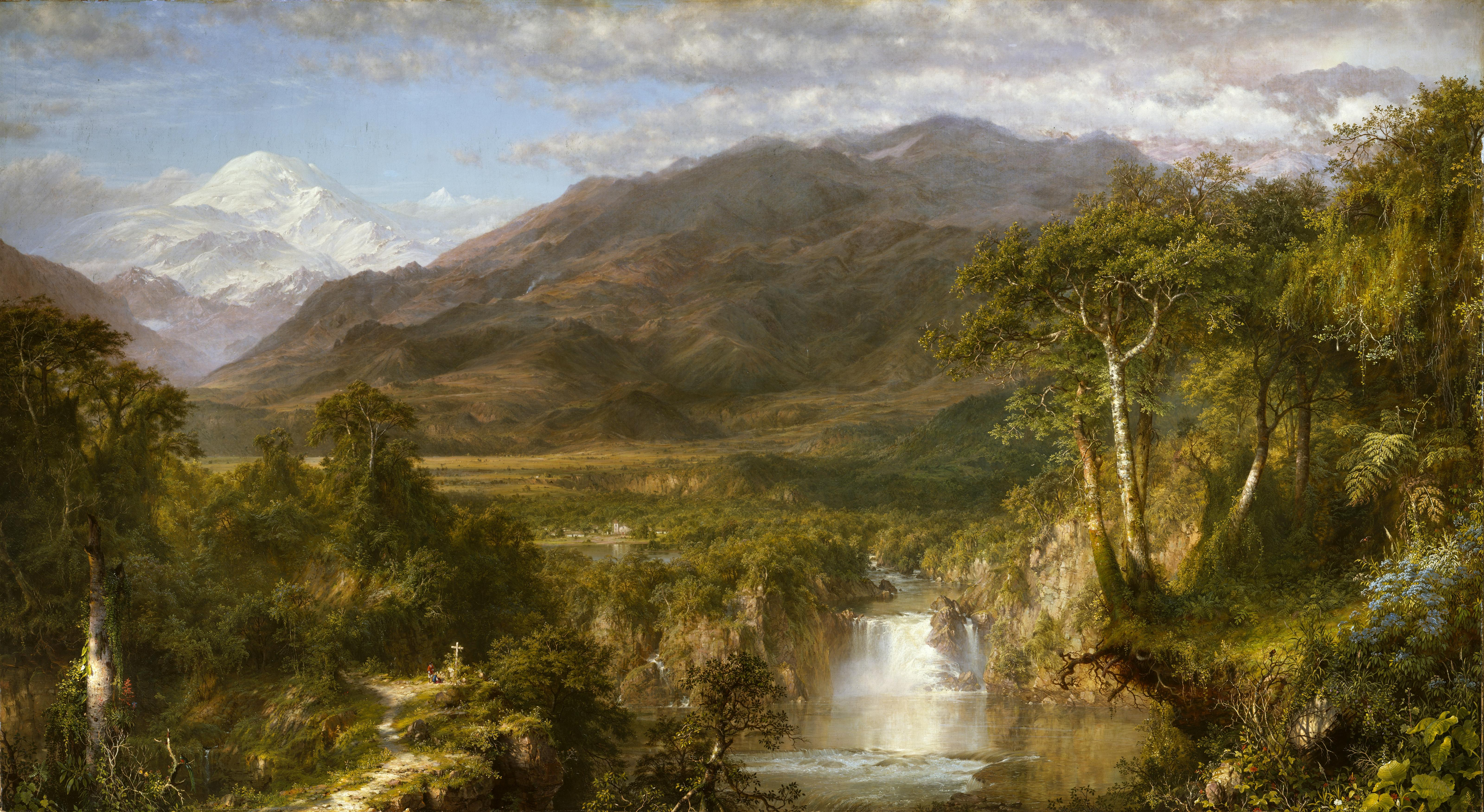
- Artist: Frederic Edwin Church
- Year: 1859
- Medium: Oil on canvas
- Dimensions: 168 cm × 303 cm (66 in × 119 in)
- Location: Metropolitan Museum of Art; New York

The Heart of the Andes is a large oil-on-canvas landscape painting by the American artist Frederic Edwin Church (1826–1900). It depicts an idealized landscape in the South American Andes, where Church traveled on two occasions. Measuring more than five feet (1.5 meters) high and almost ten feet (3.0 meters) wide, its New York City exhibition in 1859 was a sensation, establishing Church as the foremost landscape painter in the United States.

The painting was later exhibited by itself in other eastern U.S. cities. The exhibition rooms featured special lighting and decorative elements reminiscent of the depicted landscape, and the painting was supported by a floor-standing frame. The public was often enchanted by the amount of detail portrayed in it, willing to wait in line and pay a 25-cent entrance fee. Church synthesized numerous topographies of the Andes into his composition, from Mount Chimborazo to a plain and a jungle. In the details, there are numerous animals and indications of human settlement, including people visiting a cross in the left foreground.

The Heart of the Andes has been in the collection of New York's Metropolitan Museum of Art since 1909. Its first sale, to William Tilden Blodgett, broke a price record for a living American artist. It is among Church's most renowned works and an important 19th-century American painting.

== Background ==
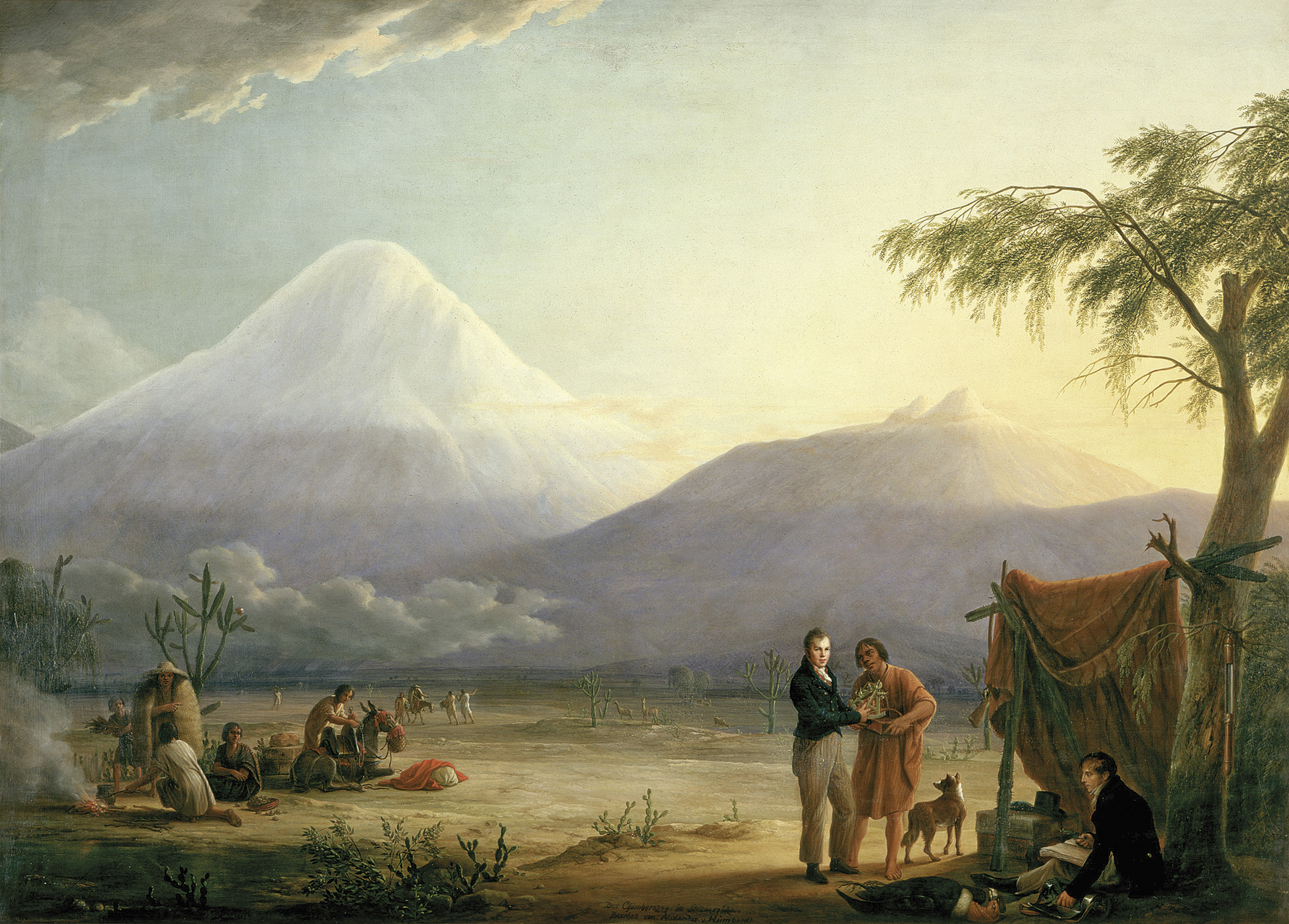
Alexander von Humboldt and Aimé Bonpland at the foot of the Chimborazo (Friedrich Georg Weitsch, 1810)

In 1853 and 1857, Church traveled in Ecuador and Colombia, financed by businessman Cyrus West Field, who wished to use Church's paintings to lure investors to his South American ventures. Church was inspired by the Prussian naturalist and explorer Alexander von Humboldt, and his 1845 treatise Kosmos. Humboldt was among the last of the great scientific generalists, and his fame became similar to that of Albert Einstein a century later. In the second volume of Kosmos, Humboldt described the influence of landscape painting on the study of the natural world—holding that art is among the highest expressions of the love of nature—and challenging artists to portray the "physiognomy" of the landscape. Church retraced Humboldt's travels in South America.

== Description and influences ==
The Heart of the Andes is a composite of the South American topography observed during his travels. At the center right of the landscape is a shimmering pool served by a waterfall. The snow-capped Mount Chimborazo of Ecuador appears in the distance; the viewer's eye is led to it by the darker, closer slopes that decline from right to left. The evidence of human presence is shown by the lightly worn path, a hamlet and church lying in the central plain, and closer to the foreground, two locals are seen before a cross. The church, a trademark detail in Church's paintings, is Catholic and Spanish-colonial, and seemingly inaccessible from the viewer's location. Church's signature appears cut into the bark of the highlighted foreground tree at left. The play of light on his signature has been interpreted as the artist's statement of man's ability to tame nature—yet the tree appears in poor health compared to the vivid jungle surrounding it.

Church's landscape conformed to the aesthetic principles of the picturesque, as propounded by the British theorist William Gilpin, which began with a careful observation of nature enhanced by particular notions about composition and harmony. The juxtaposition of smooth and irregular forms was an important principle, and is represented in The Heart of the Andes by the rounded hills and pool of water on the one hand, and by the contrasting jagged mountains and rough trees on the other.

The theory of British critic John Ruskin was also an important influence on Church. Ruskin's Modern Painters was a five-volume treatise on art that was, according to American artist Worthington Whittredge, "in every landscape painter's hand" by mid-century. Ruskin emphasized the close observation of nature, and he viewed art, morality, and the natural world as spiritually unified. Following this theme, the painting displays the landscape in detail at all scales, from the intricate foliage, birds, and butterflies in the foreground to the all-encompassing portrayal of the natural environments studied by Church. The presence of the cross suggests the peaceful coexistence of religion with the landscape.

== Exhibition ==
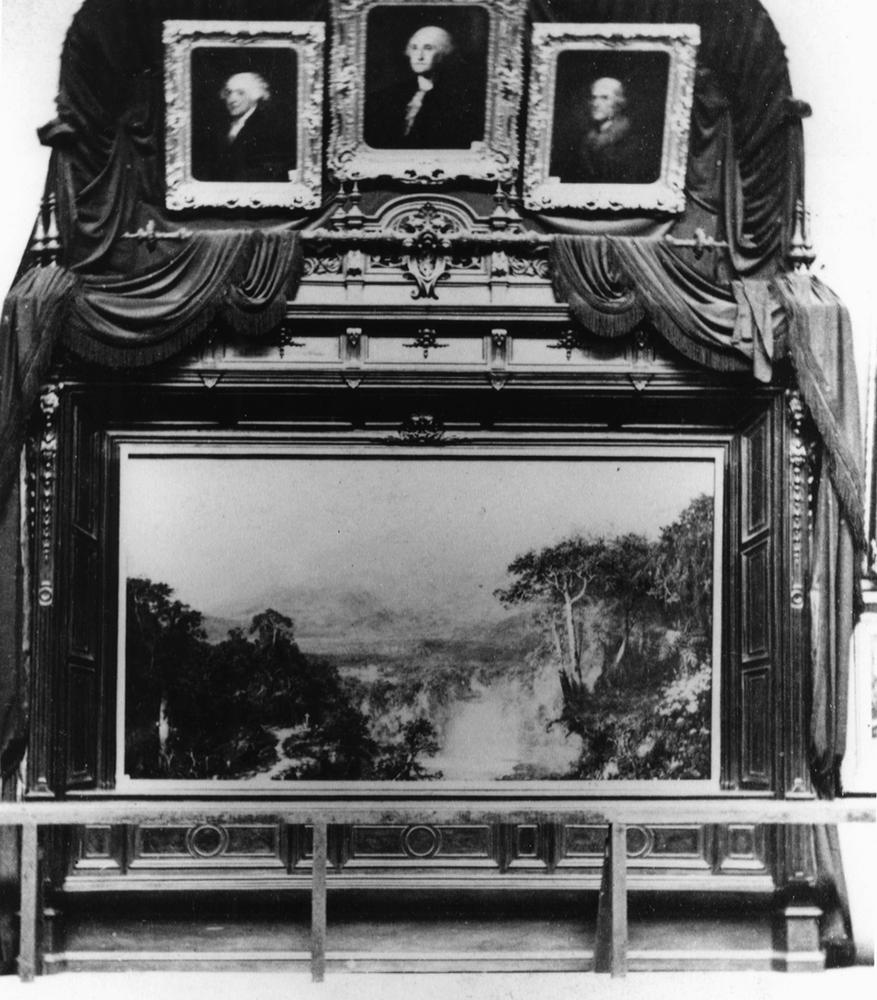
There is no photographic record of the 1859 exhibition of The Heart of the Andes; its exhibition in 1864 is pictured. The overhanging portraits and handrails were added for its inclusion in the fine art gallery at New York's Metropolitan Sanitary Fair.

The Heart of the Andes was first exhibited publicly between April 29 and May 23, 1859, at New York's Tenth Street Studio Building, the city's first studio building designed for artists. Church had exhibited single paintings previously, such as Niagara (1857), to much success. The event attracted an unprecedented turnout for a single-painting exhibition in the United States: more than 12,000 people paid an admission fee of twenty-five cents to view the painting. Even on the final day of the showing, patrons waited in line for hours to enter the Exhibition Room.

There is no record of the appearance or arrangement of the Studio Building exhibit. It has been widely claimed, although probably falsely, that the room was decorated with palm fronds and that gaslights with silver reflectors were used to illuminate the painting. More certain is that the painting's casement-window–like "frame" had a breadth of fourteen feet and a height of almost thirteen, which further imposed the painting upon the viewer. It was likely made of brown chestnut, a departure from the prevailing gilt frame. The base of the edifice stood on the ground, ensuring that the landscape's horizon would be displayed at the viewer's eye level. Drawn curtains were fitted, creating the sense of a view out a window. A skylight directed at the canvas heightened the perception that the painting was illuminated from within, as did the dark fabrics draped on the studio walls to absorb light. Opera glasses were provided to patrons to allow examination of the landscape's details, and may have been necessary to satisfactorily view the painting at all, given the crowding in the exhibition room.

Church's canvas had a strong effect on its viewers; a contemporary witness wrote: "women felt faint. Both men and women succumb[ed] to the dizzying combination of terror and vertigo that they recognize[d] as the sublime. Many of them will later describe a sensation of becoming immersed in, or absorbed by, this painting, whose dimensions, presentation, and subject matter speak of the divine power of nature."

Accompanying the admission were two pamphlets about the painting: Theodore Winthrop's A Companion to The Heart of the Andes and the Reverend Louis Legrand Noble's Church's Picture, The Heart of the Andes. In the manner of travel guides, the booklets provided a tour of the painting's varied topography. An excerpt from Noble reads:

Imagine yourself, late in the afternoon with the sun behind you, to be travelling up the valley along the bank of a river, at an elevation above the hot country of some five or six thousand feet. At the point to which you have ascended, heavily-wooded mountains close in on either hand, (not visible in the picture – only the foot of each jutting into view,) richly clothed with trees and all the appendage of the forest, with the river flowing between them. ... Conspicuous on the opposite side of the river is the road leading into the country above, a wild bridle-path in the brightest sunshine, winding up into, and losing itself in the thick shady woods. The foreground ... forms of itself a scene of unrivalled power and brilliancy, ...

Church wanted Humboldt, his intellectual mentor, to see his masterpiece. Close to the end of the first exhibition, on May 9, 1859, he wrote of this desire to American poet Bayard Taylor:

The "Andes" will probably be on its way to Europe before your return to the City ... [The] principal motive in taking the picture to Berlin is to have the satisfaction of placing before Humboldt a transcript of the scenery which delighted his eyes sixty years ago—and which he had pronounced to be the finest in the world.

Humboldt, however, died on May 6 so the planned shipment to Europe did not occur. This disappointed Church, but he would soon meet his future wife Isabel at the New York exhibition. Later in 1859, the painting was exhibited in London (July 4 – c. August 14), where it met with similar popularity. Returning to New York City, it was exhibited again from October 10 to December 5. In the next few years, showings occurred in Boston, Philadelphia, Baltimore, Cincinnati, Chicago, and St. Louis. An 1864 exhibition at the Metropolitan Sanitary Fair at New York's Union Square is better documented than the original, with photographs extant.

=== Reproduction ===
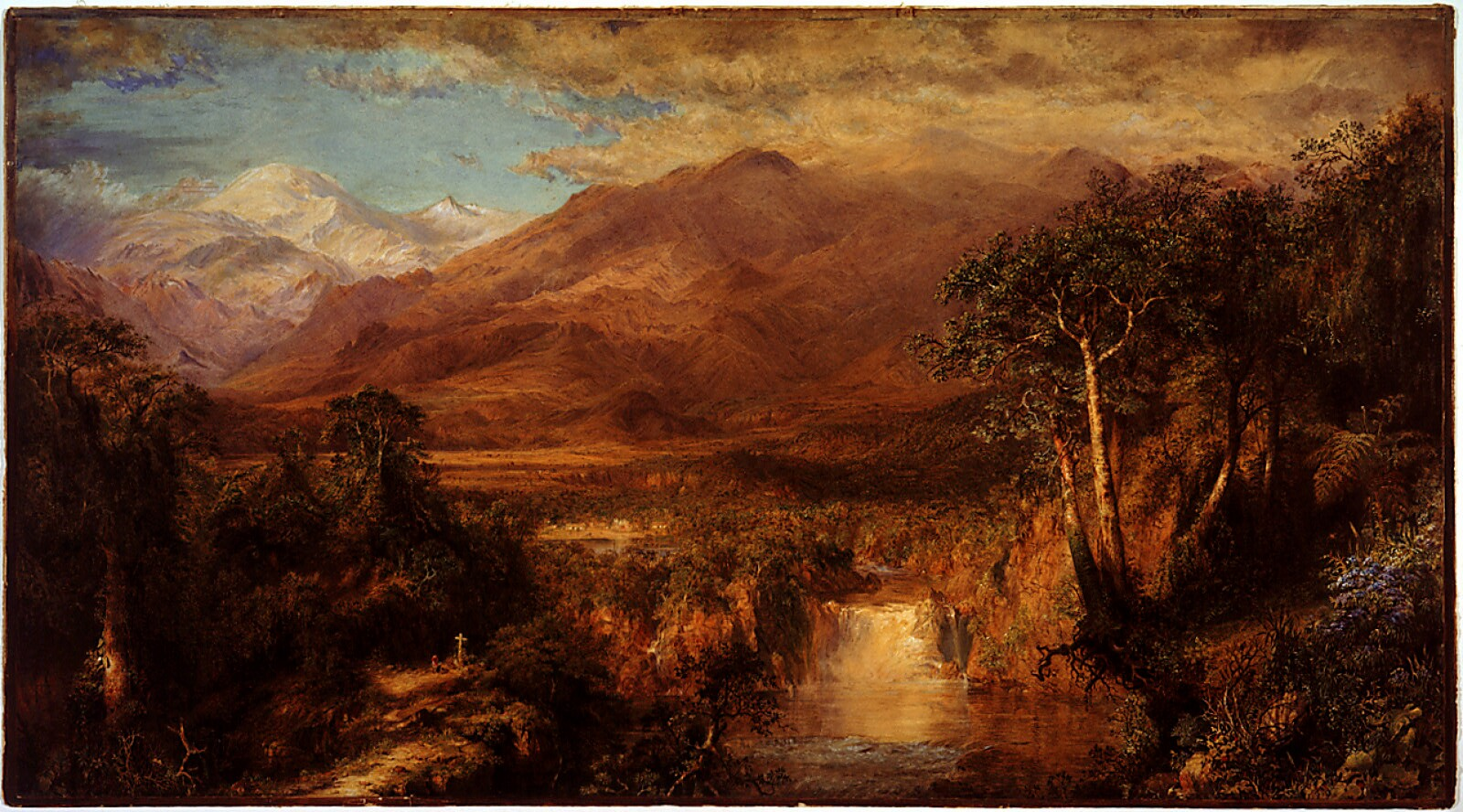
A watercolor copy prepared for the engraver's use, 1859–1860. 52.1 × 94 cm. National Gallery of Art

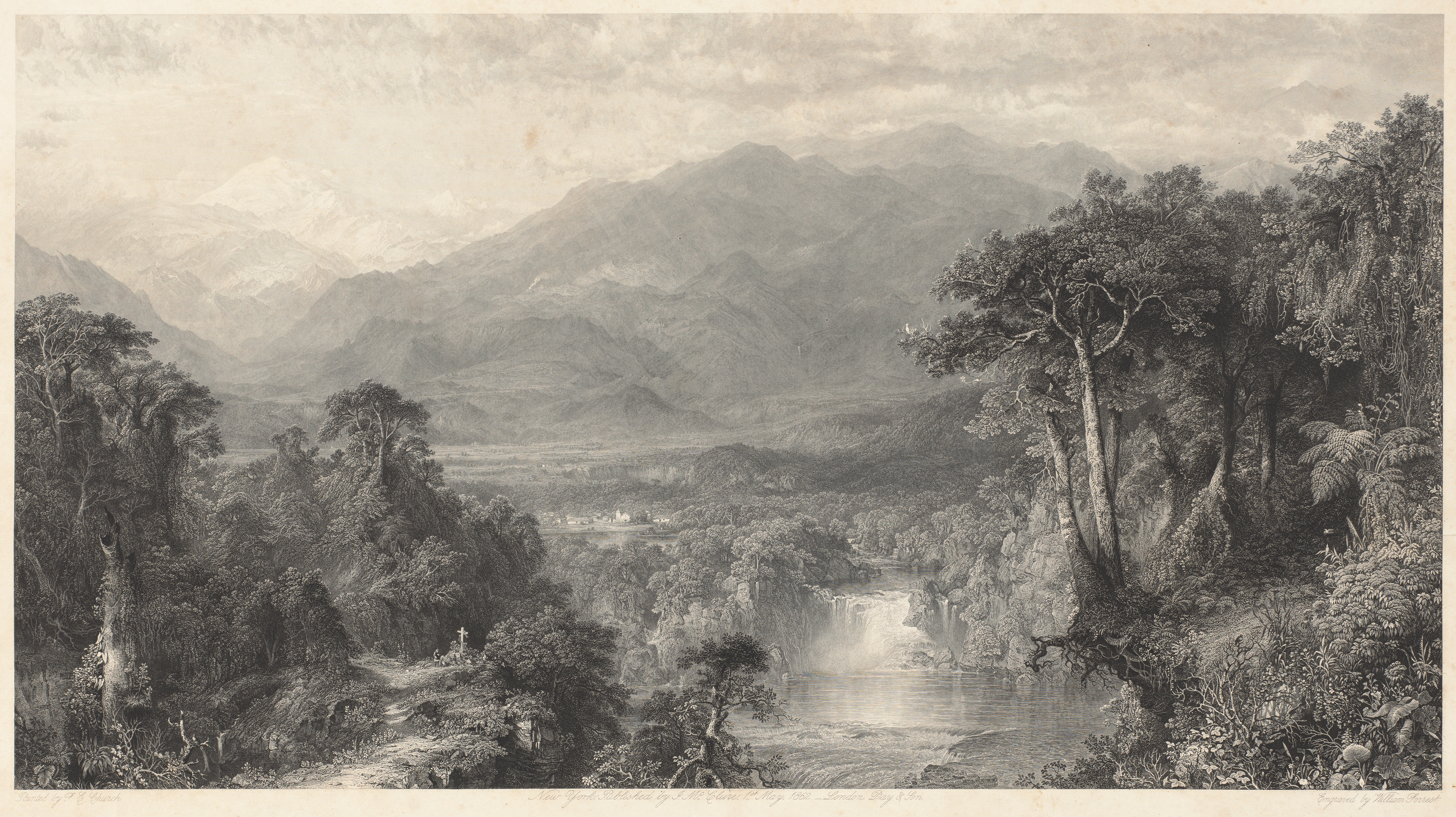
The 1862 engraving by Charles Day & Son. 34.4 x 63.2 cm

While the painting was in London, Church's agent arranged to have an engraving of it made by Charles Day & Son, which would allow for broad distribution of reproductions and hence more income. Sometime during this period a watercolor copy of The Heart of the Andes was made. It is not certain who painted the copy, but Church very likely is not the artist; the engraver Richard Woodman or one of his sons has been proposed. The watercolor is now presumed to have originated in Britain and been made for the use of the engraver, William Forrest of Edinburgh. The watercolor is now in the National Gallery of Art, Washington, D.C.

== Reception and legacy ==
The painting was widely acclaimed. Poetry was written in its honor, and a composer, George William Warren, dedicated a piece to it in 1863. Mark Twain described the painting to his brother Orion Clemens in a letter of 1860:

I have just returned from a visit to the most wonderfully beautiful painting which this city has ever seen—Church's 'Heart of the Andes' ... I have seen it several times, but it is always a new picture—totally new—you seem to see nothing the second time which you saw the first. We took the opera glass, and examined its beauties minutely, for the naked eye cannot discern the little wayside flowers, and soft shadows and patches of sunshine, and half-hidden bunches of grass and jets of water which form some of its most enchanting features. There is no slurring of perspective effect about it—the most distant—the minutest object in it has a marked and distinct personality—so that you may count the very leaves on the trees. When you first see the tame, ordinary-looking picture, your first impulse is to turn your back upon it, and say "Humbug"—but your third visit will find your brain gasping and straining with futile efforts to take all the wonder in—and appreciate it in its fulness and understand how such a miracle could have been conceived and executed by human brain and human hands. You will never get tired of looking at the picture, but your reflections—your efforts to grasp an intelligible Something—you hardly know what—will grow so painful that you will have to go away from the thing, in order to obtain relief. You may find relief, but you cannot banish the picture—it remains with you still. It is in my mind now—and the smallest feature could not be removed without my detecting it.

The New York Times described the painting's "harmony of design" and "chaos of chords or colors gradually rises upon the enchanted mind a rich and orderly creation, full of familiar objects, yet wholly new in its combinations and its significance."

Church eventually sold the work to William Tilden Blodgett for $10,000—at that time the highest price paid for a work by a living American artist. Moreover, Church reserved the right to re-sell the painting should he receive an offer of at least $20,000. (American landscapist Albert Bierstadt surpassed both prices when he sold The Rocky Mountains, Lander's Peak for $25,000 in 1865.) Blodgett held the painting until his death in 1875. It was acquired by Margaret Worcester Dows, widow of grain merchant David Dows, and bequeathed to the Metropolitan Museum of Art upon her death in February 1909. In 1993, the museum held an exhibition that attempted to reproduce the conditions of the 1859 exhibit.

Recent descriptions place it within modern thematic discourse, including the tension between art and science, and American territorial expansion. The split between the humanities and the scientific worldview was nascent in 1859: Charles Darwin's On the Origin of Species was published later in the same year as Church's painting.

== See also ==
- List of paintings by Frederic Edwin Church
