= First Methodist Protestant Church of Seattle =

Historic church in Washington, United States

- U.S. National Register of Historic Places
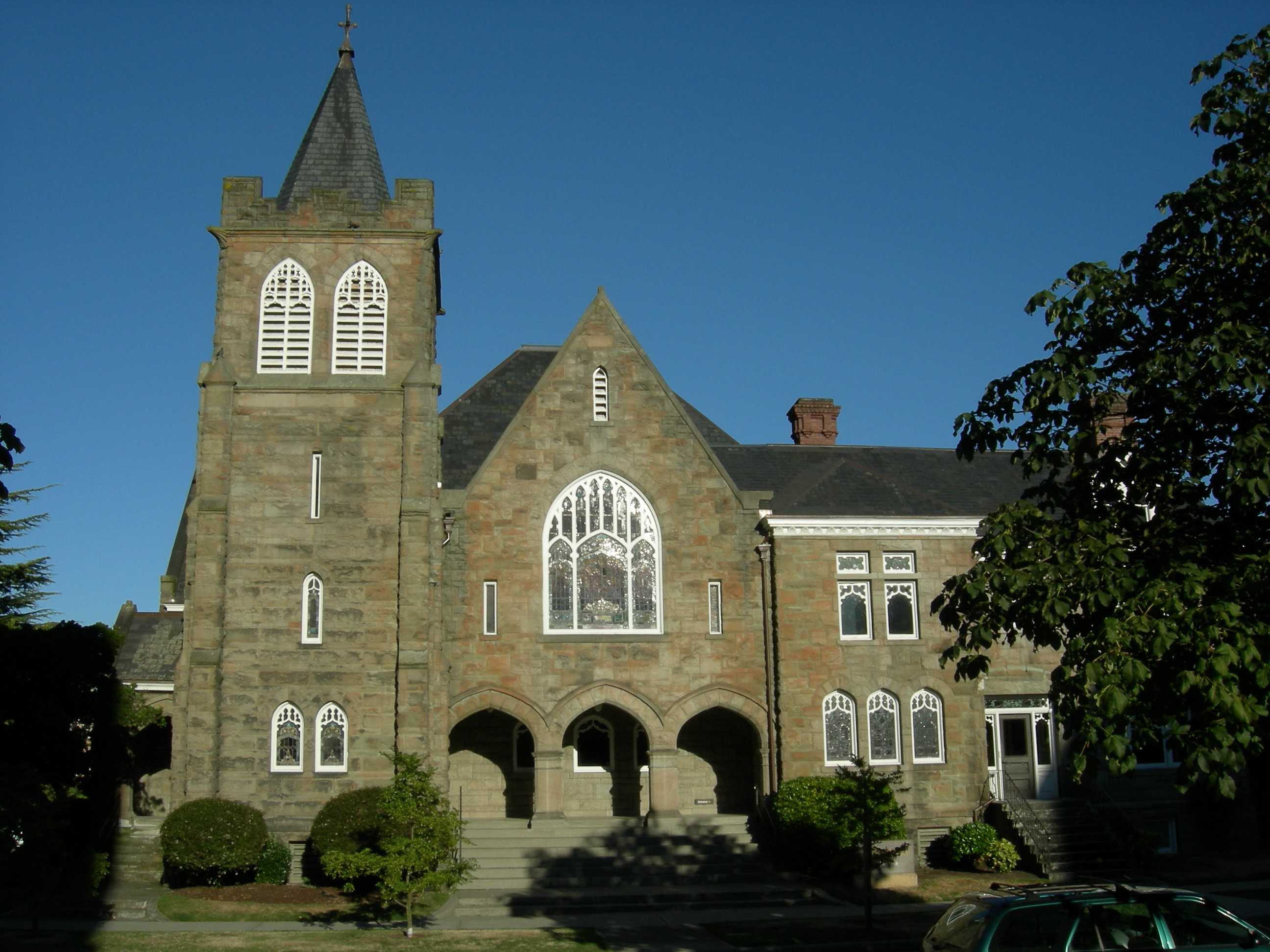

- Location within Washington (state) Location within the United States
- Location: 128 16th Ave. E., Seattle, Washington
- Coordinates: 47°37′11″N 122°18′37″W
- Area: less than one acre
- Built: 1906
- Architect: Fulton, John Charles; Layton & White
- Architectural style: Colonial Revival, Gothic Revival
- NRHP reference No.: 93000364
- Added to NRHP: May 14, 1993

First Methodist Protestant Church of Seattle (Capitol Hill United Methodist Church, Catalysis) is an historic building, originally built and used as a church, in Seattle, Washington. Built in 1906, it was added to the National Register in 1993.

The church that was originally housed in this building, First Methodist Protestant Church of Seattle, later known as Capitol Hill United Methodist Church, was founded by Rev. Daniel Bagley in 1865 and met in buildings in downtown Seattle until the construction of this building on Capitol Hill. In 1991, due to declining membership and increasing costs of building upkeep, the church moved out of the building. The building was renovated from a church to an office building in 2004, and is currently owned and occupied by Catalysis Corporation, a Seattle-based digital marketing agency.

Neither the church nor the building should be confused with the First Methodist Episcopal Church of Seattle, which was founded in 1853 (the first church organized in Seattle), which was also once housed in a historic building (at Fifth Avenue and Marion Street in downtown Seattle) built in 1906. Prior to the construction of the 1906 buildings, when both congregations met downtown, they were disambiguated by calling the Methodist Episcopal church the "Little White Church" and the Methodist Protestant one the "Little Brown Church". When the Methodist Episcopal Church and the Methodist Protestant Church became a single denomination in 1939, the congregation that met in the Capitol Hill building that is the subject of this article changed their name from "First Methodist Protestant" to "Capitol Hill Methodist", while the downtown Methodist Episcopal congregation became simply "First Methodist Church"; decades later, another denominational merger led to both adding "United" to their names.
