= Jean Margaret Davenport =

English actress (1829–1903)

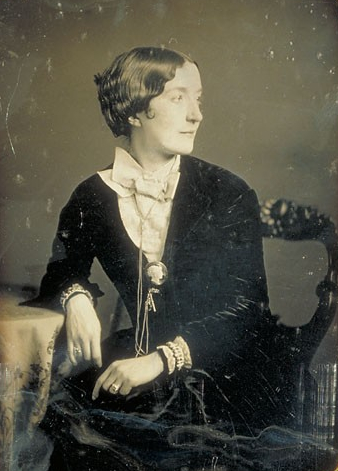
- Born: May 3, 1829; Wolverhampton, England
- Died: August 3, 1903 (aged 74); Washington, D.C., U.S.
- Resting place: Oak Hill Cemetery; Washington, D.C., U.S.
- Occupation: Actress

Jean Margaret Davenport (May 3, 1829, Wolverhampton, England – August 3, 1903, Washington, D.C.), later Mrs. Frederick William Lander, was an English actress with a career in both England and the United States.

== Biography ==
Her father was a lawyer, but he left the bar for the stage, and became the manager of the Richmond Theatre, where Jean made her first professional appearance, in 1837, as Little Pickle in The Manager's Daughter — a piece that is also known as The Spoiled Child, and, in Dion Boucicault's version, as The Young Actress.

She also played in King Richard the Third, being the first representative of that play seen in Richmond Theatre since the death of the great actor Edmund Kean. She played in other cities prior to coming to America in 1838.

Her first appearance in America occurred at the National Theatre, New York, under the management of James William Wallack, the Elder. Afterward she played star engagements in other cities. In 1842 she returned to Europe and traveled in Italy and France. Her education, at that time, was conducted by private tutors.

In Paris, she studied music under the tuition of García, but decided to pursue a career in drama. In 1846 she went to the Netherlands, taking an English company, with whom she acted at Amsterdam, Rotterdam, and The Hague, and, in Germany, at Hamburg and Hanover, receiving adulation, acclamation and adoration. That tour occupied two years and was remunerative. In England in 1848 she made her appearance as a public reader, being one of the first women to give readings from Shakespeare since Sarah Siddons, who died in 1831.

Her second visit to America was made in 1849, and she determined to make it her home. Her father died at Cincinnati, Ohio on July 5, 1851, and, in the following year, she went once more to England, there to settle the affairs of her parents’ estate and to study for the next dramatic season.

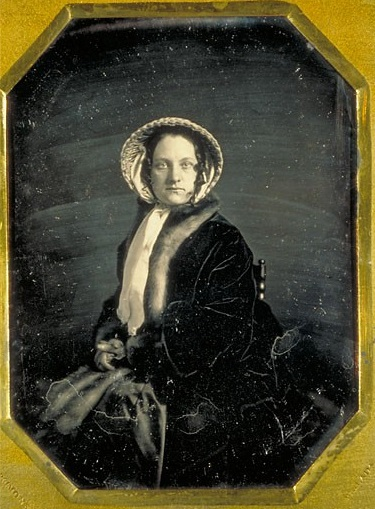
Jean Margaret Davenport Lander

In 1853, she returned to her adopted country, then made her first visit to California in 1855 and again traveled to England a few times (1856–1859). In San Francisco, she became the wife of transcontinental explorer and civil engineer Frederick W. Lander on October 12, 1860. Her married life was happy, but brief; her husband, by then a brigadier general during the Civil War, died of pneumonia in camp on March 3, 1862, after his requests for medical leave were ignored. President Abraham Lincoln attended the funeral at the Church of the Epiphany (Washington, D.C.). For two years, Jean Lander subsequently served as a supervisor in charge of the nurses working in the Union Army hospitals at Beaufort, South Carolina.

On April 19, 1861, at approximately midnight — when Washington, D.C., was expecting the Confederate Army to invade at any moment — Jean Davenport Lander knocked on the door of the White House. She met with John Hay, Lincoln's assistant secretary, and told him she'd heard from a Virginian that he and several other men "would do a thing within forty-eight hours that would ring throughout the world." Jean believed he meant that the gang intended to capture or assassinate the president, and she came to warn him.

On February 5, 1865, Jean Davenport Lander reappeared, acting at Niblo's Garden Theatre, New York, in a drama called Mésalliance. The arrival of Adelaide Ristori to America brought a new set of characters into vogue — Queen Elizabeth, Queen Mary Stuart, Queen Marie Antoinette, etc. — and Lander availed herself of that new predilection of popular taste. Her performance of Queen Elizabeth was first seen at the National Theatre, Washington, in April 1867.

She was the original representative, in America, of Marguerite Gauthier, a part which she named Camille, — acting it in a play that she had adapted from La Dame aux Camélias, by Alexandre Dumas, fils; her adaptation was "edited" by John Wilkin, an English journalist, and it was first presented to her in Philadelphia.

She was the original representative in America of Legouvé's Medée, in English, and of Colombe; she also acted in Robert Browning's Colombe's Birthday; Peg Woffington; in Charles Reade's Masks and Faces, and as Hester Prynne, in Nathaniel Hawthorne's The Scarlet Letter.

Her last appearance was made at the Boston Theatre, January 1, 1877, in The Scarlet Letter.

== Death and legacy ==
The later years of her life were passed in retirement, in Washington. She died at her summer residence in Lynn, Massachusetts on August 3, 1903. She is buried at Oak Hill Cemetery in Washington. The Tiffany glass window which she donated to St. Mark's Church in 1889 remains on display.

== Dickens ==
Davenport was most likely the inspiration for the character of Ninetta Crummles, the "infant phenomenon" child actress in the Charles Dickens novel Nicholas Nickleby, and her father the model for theatre-manager Vincent Crummles, though the Davenport family issued denials of the claim.
