= Frederick W. Lander =

Surveyor and Union Army General

Frederick William Lander
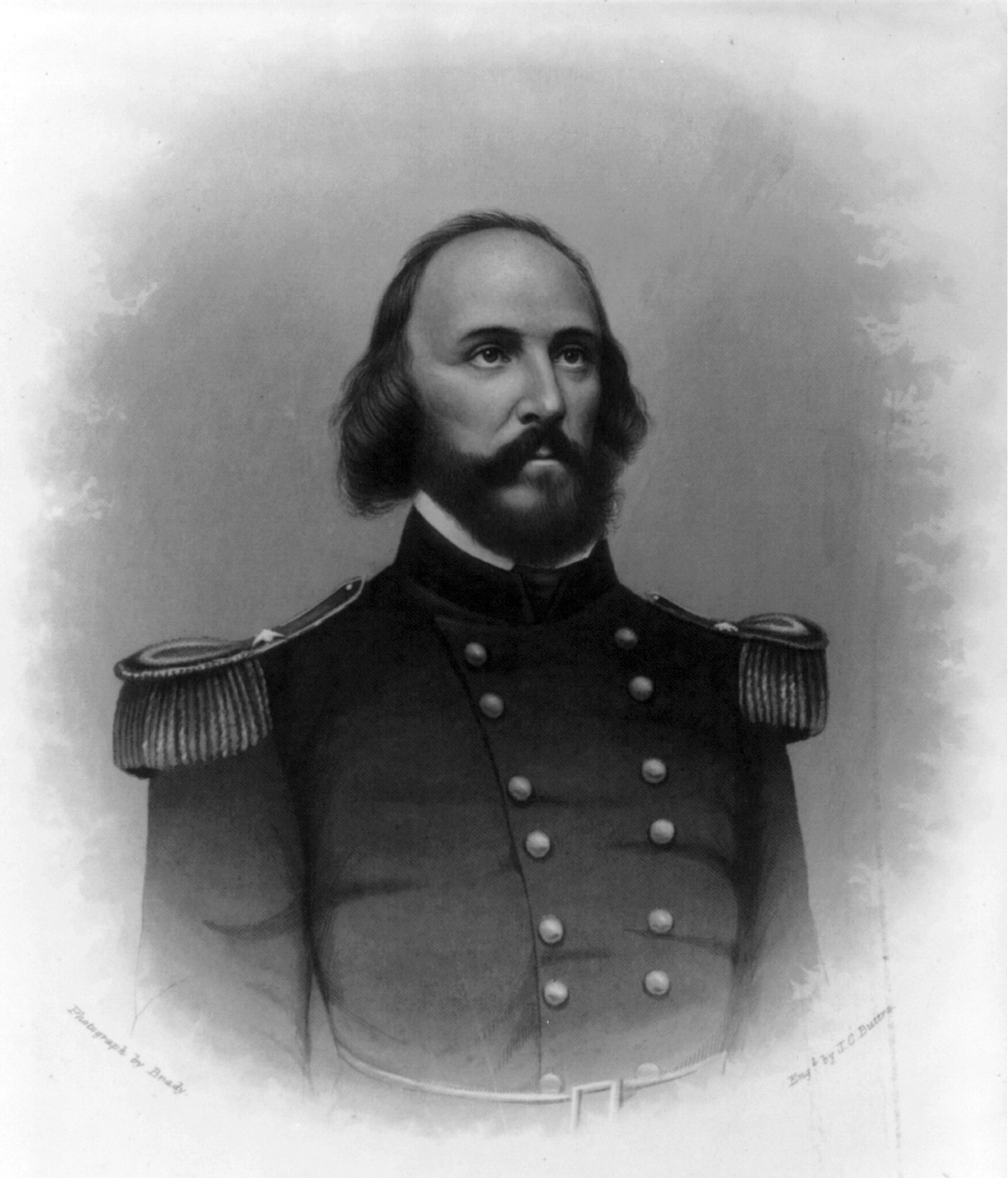
- Frederick W. Lander
- Born: December 17, 1821; Salem, Massachusetts
- Died: March 2, 1862 (aged 40); Paw Paw, Virginia (now West Virginia)
- Military career
- Allegiance: United States; Union
- Branch: United States Army; Union Army
- Service years: 1861–1862
- Rank: Brigadier General
- Conflicts: American Civil War

Frederick William Lander (December 17, 1821 – March 2, 1862) was a transcontinental United States explorer, general in the Union Army during the American Civil War, and a prolific poet.

== Birth and early years ==
Lander was born in Salem, Massachusetts, the son of Edward and Eliza West Lander; his sister was the sculptor Louisa Lander and one of his brothers was Edward M. Lander. He was educated at Governor Dummer Academy, Phillips Academy, Andover and Norwich Military Academy in Vermont and thereafter took up the profession of civil engineering as an army officer.

While attending Governor Dummer Academy as a child, Lander began a longtime friendship with later Massachusetts State Senator William Dummer Northend, father to Mary Harrod Northend and William Wheelwright Northend.

The United States government employed him on transcontinental surveys to select a route for a Pacific railroad. Later he undertook a survey for the same purpose at his own expense and was the only man of the party to survive. He constructed the overland wagon route in the face of great difficulties and constant hostility of the Indians. After its completion in 1859, the Lander Road became popular with wagon trains as an alternate route from Burnt Ranch in the Wyoming Territory to Fort Hall in the Oregon Territory.

His expedition to survey the Lander Road in 1859 included artists Albert Bierstadt, Henry Hitchings, and Francis Seth Frost, who photographed, sketched, and painted some of the earliest images that people could see of the West.

== Civil War service ==
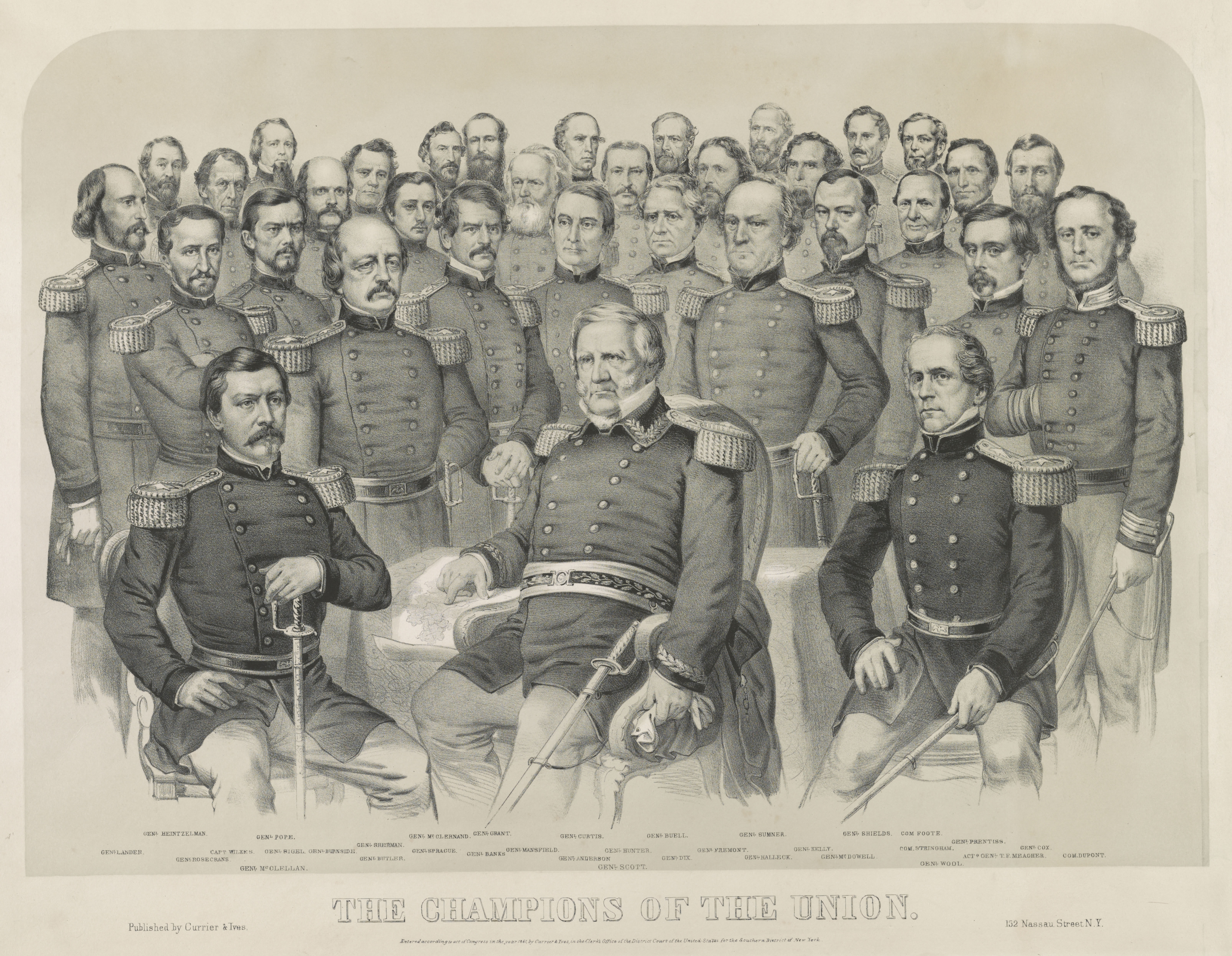
Gen. Lander in The champions of the Union, lithograph by Currier & Ives, 1861

During the early part of the Civil War, Lander served with distinction on secret missions as a volunteer aide de camp on the staff of General McClellan. He was promoted to brigadier general of volunteers on May 17, 1861, and served on the staff of General Thomas A. Morris during the battles of Philippi and Rich Mountain and many minor skirmishes. Lander published a popular poem on the Battle of Ball's Bluff, as well as several other patriotic poems that drew national attention.

At the conclusion of the Western Virginia campaign, General Lander was assigned to command a brigade in Charles Pomeroy Stone's Division of the Army of the Potomac. After just a short time in command of a brigade he was assigned to command the District of Harpers Ferry & Cumberland, Maryland where he was involved in a small engagement at Edward's Ferry, the day after the Battle of Ball's Bluff and was badly wounded in the leg. He was now given the command of a division in the Army of the Potomac with the task of protecting the upper Potomac River. When Confederate forces under Stonewall Jackson bombarded Hancock, Maryland, Lander refused to surrender the town, forcing the Confederates to withdraw towards, Romney, West Virginia. He led a successful charge against a Confederate camp at Bloomery Gap on February 14, 1862. About 2 weeks later he was stricken by a "congestive chill."

== Death and legacy ==
Lander died from complications of pneumonia at Camp Chase, Paw Paw, Virginia (later West Virginia) on March 2, 1862, after receiving no response to his requests for relief from command due to poor health for over two weeks. President Lincoln attended his funeral at the Church of the Epiphany in Washington.

Lander had married English-born stage actress Jean Margaret Davenport in San Francisco in October 1860, but the couple had no children. Davenport served as a Union military nurse and supervisor for two years in South Carolina after her husband's death. He is buried at the Broad Street Cemetery in Salem, Massachusetts.

== Namesakes ==
- Lander, Wyoming
- Lander County, Nevada
- Lander Peak
- Lander Creek
- Landers Fork
- Lander, Maryland
- General Frederick W. Lander Post No. 5 of the Grand Army of the Republic in Lynn, Massachusetts

== See also ==
- List of American Civil War generals (Union)
- List of Massachusetts generals in the American Civil War
- Massachusetts in the American Civil War
- The Rocky Mountains, Lander's Peak painting
- Lynn Massachusetts G.A.R. Hall and Museum
