= Lander Peak =

Mountain in the state of Wyoming

Coordinates: 42.7849°N 110.5461°W

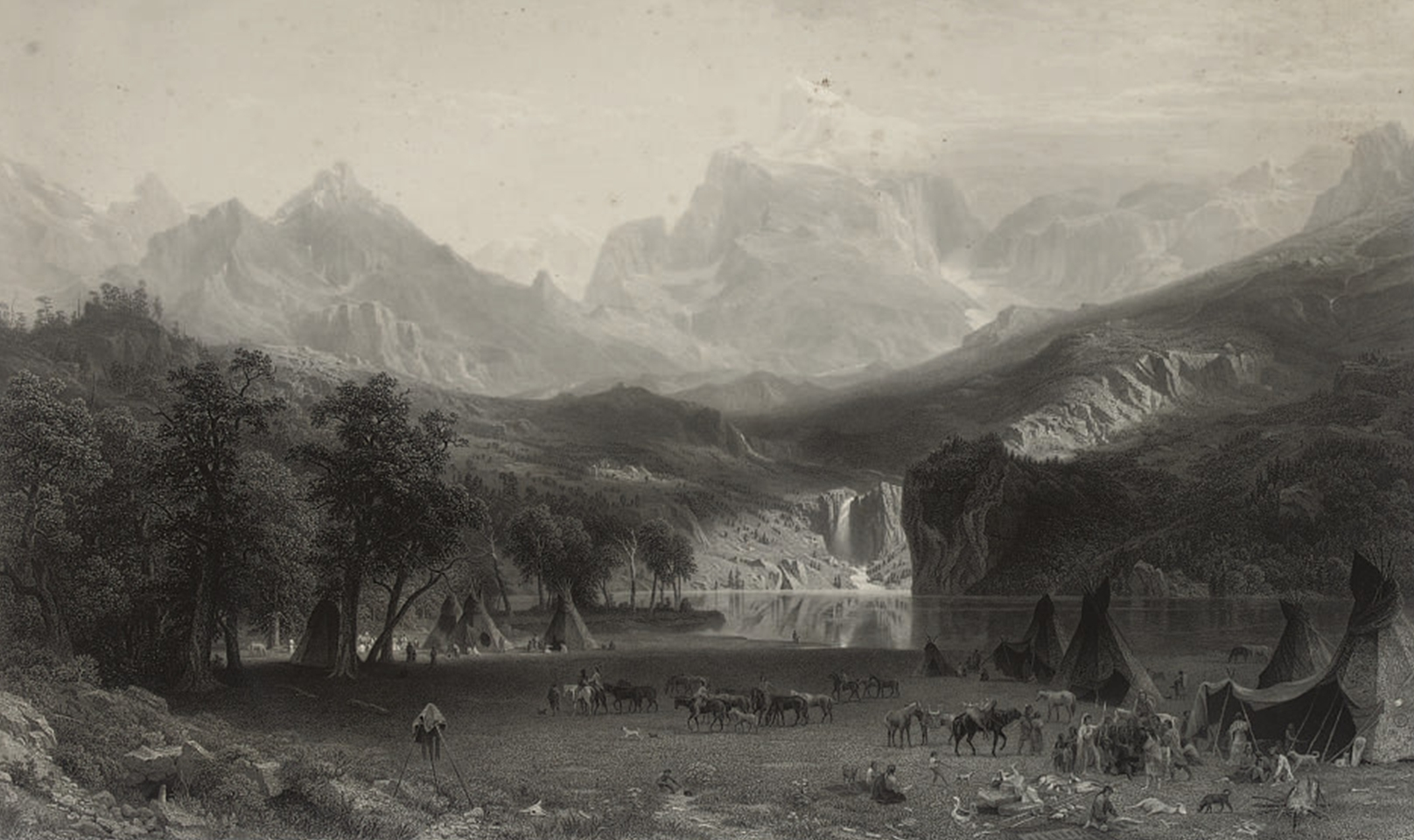
- The Rocky Mountains, Lander's Peak, Steel engraving by James Smillie after Albert Bierstadt

Highest point
- Elevation: 10,463 ft (3,189 m)
- Prominence: 786 ft (240 m)

Geography
- Location: Sublette County, Wyoming, U.S.
- Parent range: Wyoming Range

Lander Peak, elevation 10,463 ft (3,189 m), is a mountain located in Western Wyoming, near the border with Idaho.

The mountain is better known due to a painting by Albert Bierstadt. In 1859, Frederick W. Lander, accompanied by Bierstadt, embarked on a western expedition. On his return he painted a mountain landscape on a large 6-by-10-foot (1.8-by-3.0-meter) canvas, The Rocky Mountains, Lander's Peak. Following the death of General Lander during the Civil War in 1862, Bierstadt named the peak Lander's Peak. The painting was completed in 1863 and sold in 1865 for $25,000.
