= Louisa Lander =

American sculptor

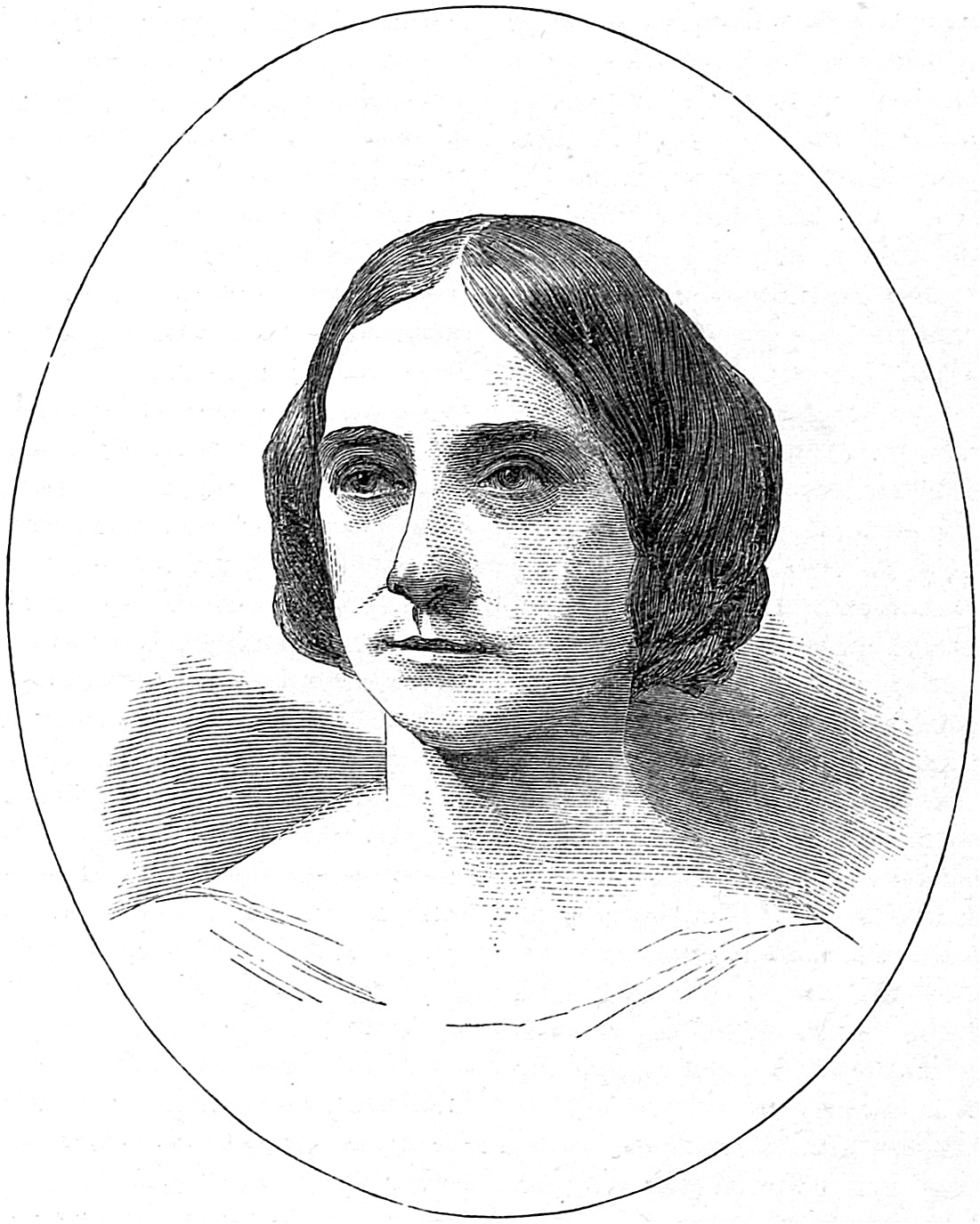
- Louisa Lander in 1861
- Born: October 8, 1826; Salem, Massachusetts, U.S.
- Died: 1923 (aged 96–97); Washington, D.C., U.S.

Louisa Lander (1826–1923) was a member of the expatriate community of American women sculptors who settled in Rome in the mid-nineteenth century, led by Charlotte Cushman and Harriet Hosmer. Lander was ostracized from this community in 1859 due to a rumored personal scandal, and many of the details of her later life remain unknown.

== Early life ==
(Maria) Louisa Lander was born in 1826 in Salem, Massachusetts, to a privileged New England family. She was the great-granddaughter of Elias Hasket Derby, and her grandfather on her mother's side was a relative of the painter Benjamin West. Her father was a ship captain, and her brothers were Col. Frederick W. Lander, who explored the American west, and Edward M. Lander who became the first Chief Justice of Washington Territory. Her family home in Danvers, Massachusetts was decorated with carvings by the Skillin brothers and Samuel McIntire, and she studied these works to fuel her artistic ambitions. She began carving and modeling in wood, alabaster, and sealing wax, and worked professionally as a cameo carver in her early career. By 1855, she had her own studio in Salem, where she produced portraits and ideal busts.

== Expatriate in Rome ==
In 1855 Lander went to Rome, where she joined the circle of American women expatriate artists that included Harriet Hosmer, Anne Whitney, Edmonia Lewis, and Emma Stebbins, a group satirized by novelist Henry James as the "white marmorean flock." She immediately sought out the American sculptor Thomas Crawford, whose work she had studied during visits to the Boston Athenaeum. Impressed with her work, Crawford took her on as a student and assistant, and she studied with him for a little over a year before his untimely death in 1857.

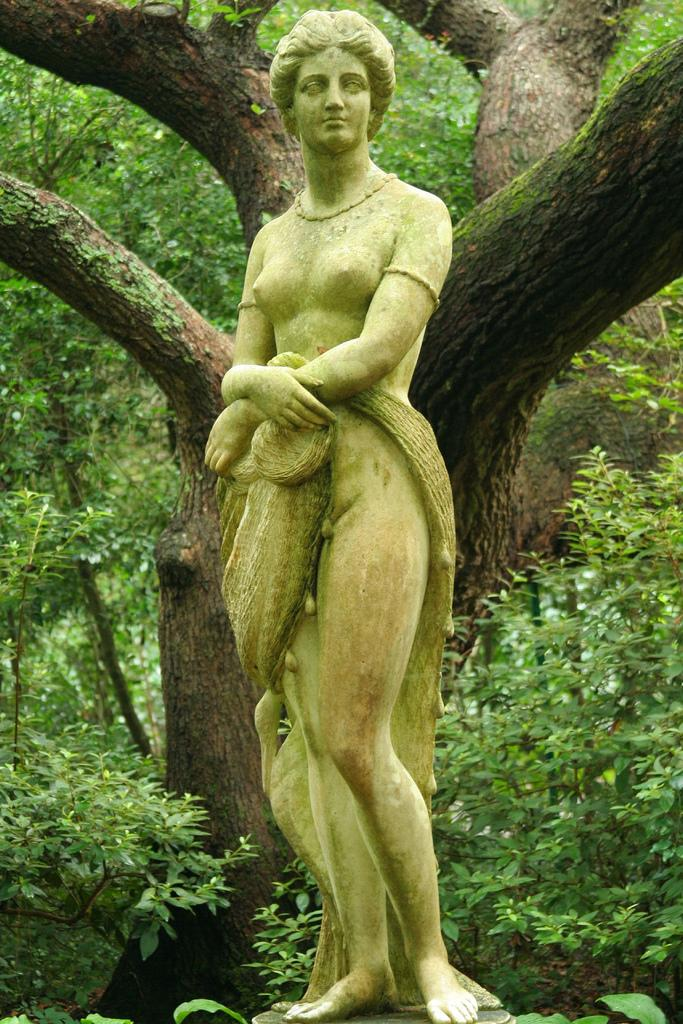
Virginia Dare by Louisa Lander, 1859

After Crawford's death, Lander established her own studio. Here she began a life-sized sculpture of Virginia Dare, who was the first child born of English parents in the Americas and who disappeared with her parents in the mystery of the Lost Colony of Roanoke Island. While there is no evidence that the child survived, one persistent theory has suggested that the colonists of Roanoke were absorbed into the local Indian population, and Lander imaginatively depicted Dare as an adult Indian princess. Lander's Dare is in the tradition of the captivity narrative, a genre in American art and literature of the nineteenth century that depicted white Euro-American women as the captives of Native Americans or other non-white populations. Other American sculptures from this period in the same tradition included Hiram Powers' Greek Slave (1843) and Erastus Dow Palmer's White Captive (1859) but unlike the passive victims depicted by Powers and Palmer, Lander's Dare seems to embrace her alternate lifestyle. As Melissa Dabakis has suggested, the "partial nudity, competing identities, and implied sexual violence" of the sculpture may have contributed to its cool reception. Lander completed the plaster version of Virginia Dare in 1859 and the marble in 1860.

Reception of Virginia Dare may also have been colored by a personal scandal that negatively impacted Lander's standing in the circle of American artists in Rome. Among her patrons was fellow Salemite Nathaniel Hawthorne, who sat for a portrait bust. Hawthorne was quite taken with her, and Lander became close to the entire Hawthorne family, often accompanying the family or Hawthorne alone on tourist outings around Rome. Critics have made the case that one or both of the two female artists in Hawthorne's work, The Marble Faun (1860), could be based on Louisa Lander, given their relationship. However, late in 1858, the relationship between Lander and the Hawthornes soured. In June of that year, Lander made a trip home to Boston to promote her statues of Evangeline and Virginia Dare. When she returned to Rome in November, the Hawthornes refused to see her. During that time, rumors had circulated that Lander had, in her cousin John Rogers' words, "lived on uncommonly good terms with some man here," or that she had posed as a nude model. As a result of these rumors, Lander was ostracized from the American expatriate community in Rome.

== Later life ==
Lander returned to Boston on April 1, 1860, and took a studio on Tremont Street. She was warmly received by the Boston art world, and she was able to recuperate her damaged career. In May 1861, after the outbreak of the American Civil War, she moved to Washington, DC, and volunteered as a nurse in local hospitals, where she also continued to pursue her sculptural career. Little is known of her life after the 1870s.

== Selected works ==
- Evangeline (1856-1858)
- Nathaniel Hawthorne, Concord Free Library, Concord, Massachusetts
- Virginia Dare (1859), Elizabethan Gardens, Roanoke, North Carolina
- Undine (c. 1861)
- Evangeline (exhibited at the Düsseldorf Gallery, New York City)
- Elizabeth, the exile of Siberia
- Ceres Mourning for Proserpine
