= Tenth Street Studio Building =

Art studio building in New York City (1857–1956)

Coordinates: 40.73437°N 73.99753°W

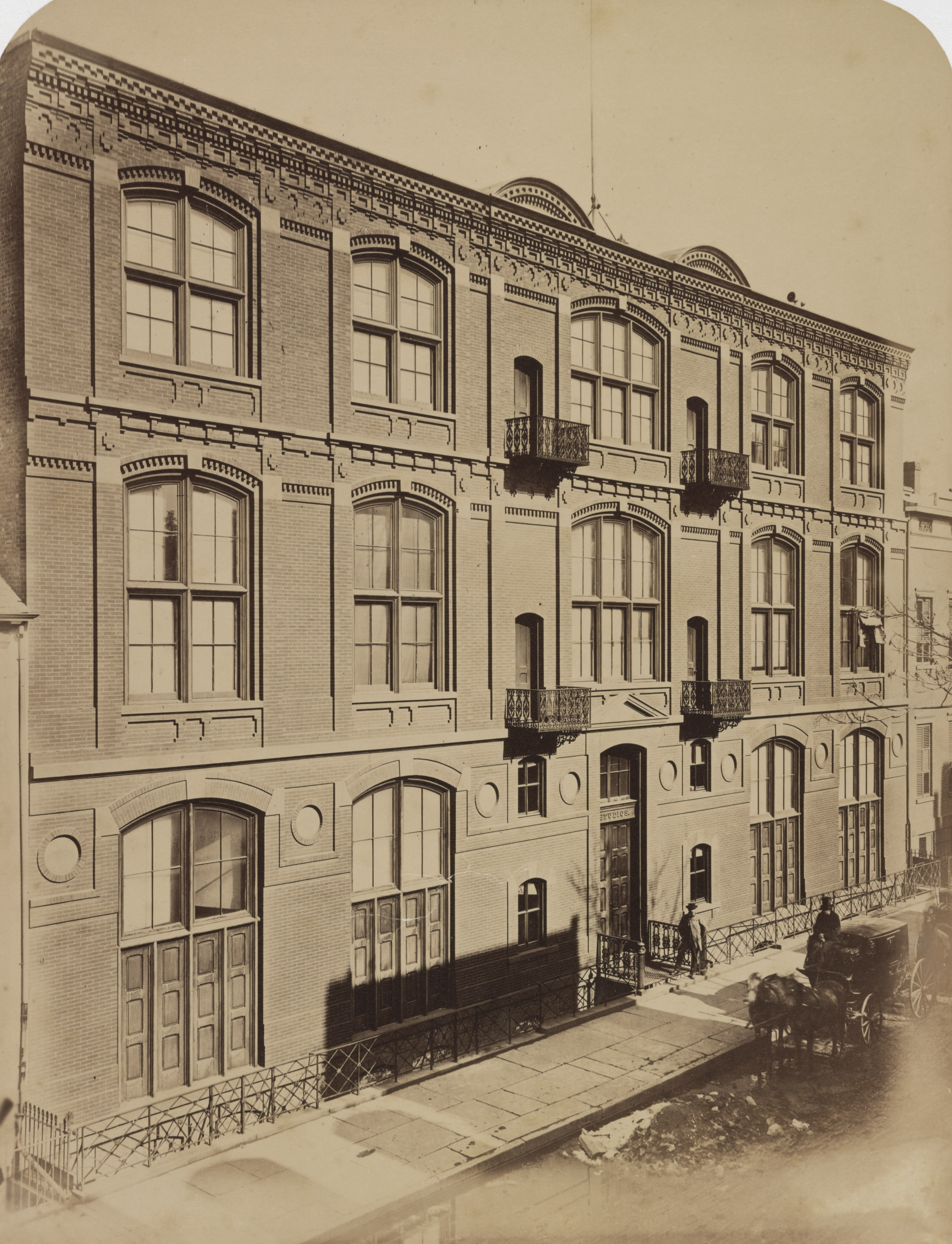
Tenth Street Studio Building at 51 West 10th Street between Fifth and Sixth Avenues in New York City, photographed in 1870.

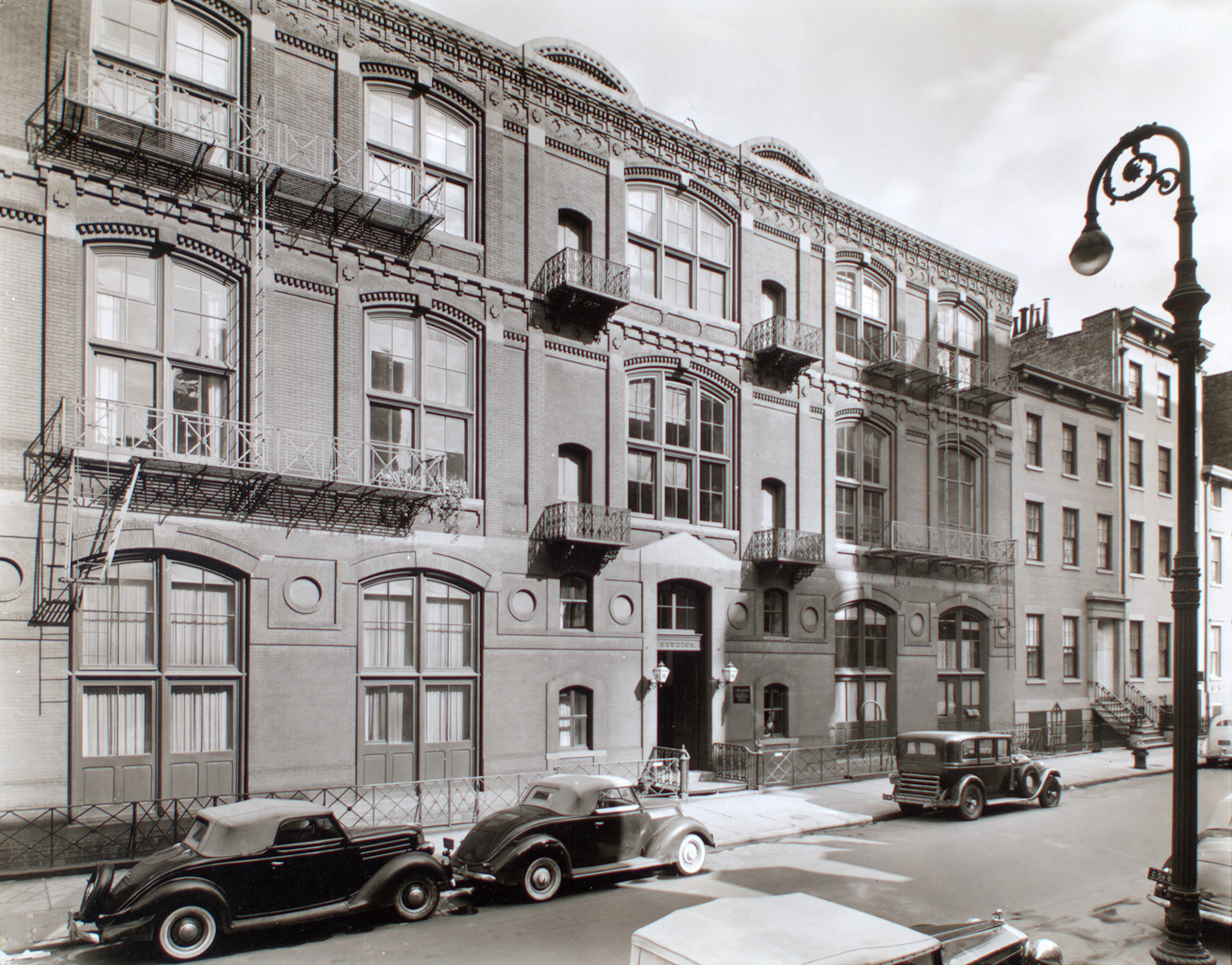
Tenth Street Studio Building photographed in 1938.

The Tenth Street Studio Building, constructed in New York City in 1857, was the first modern facility designed solely to serve the needs of artists. It became the center of the New York art world for the remainder of the 19th century.

Situated at 51 West 10th Street between Fifth and Sixth Avenues in the Greenwich Village neighborhood of Manhattan, the building was commissioned by James Boorman Johnston (Note: James Boorman Johnston (1822-1887) was a son of the prominent Scottish-born New York merchant John Johnston, in partnership with James Boorman (1783-1866) as Boorman & Johnston, developers of Washington Square North, and a founder of New York University; an 1831 Johnston Children group portrait is in the inventory of the Museum of the City of New york.) and designed by Richard Morris Hunt. Its innovative design soon represented a national architectural prototype, and featured a domed central gallery, from which interconnected rooms radiated. Hunt's studio within the building housed the first architectural school in the United States.

Soon after its completion, the building helped to make Greenwich Village central to the arts in New York City, drawing artists from all over the country to work, exhibit, and sell their art. In its initial years, Winslow Homer took a studio there, as did Edward Lamson Henry, Hendrik Dirk Kruseman van Elten, and many of the artists of the Hudson River School, including Martin Johnson Heade and Albert Bierstadt. Perhaps the most famous tenant of all was Frederic Edwin Church, who held a landmark single-picture exhibition of The Heart of the Andes in the building's central atrium.

In 1879, Johnston deeded the building to his brother John Taylor Johnston, who later became the first president of the Metropolitan Museum of Art. In that same year William Merritt Chase moved into the main gallery, and was joined in the building by Walter Shirlaw and Frederick Dielman. Chase's studio in particular represented the sophisticated taste which came to characterize the building.

In 1895, Chase departed the studio, and the building subsequently lost its prominence as an art center.

Kahlil Gibran lived on the third story from 1911 until his death in 1931.

In 1920, the building was purchased by a group of artists in order to forestall commercial takeover. From that time forward, a number of New York City artists rented studio space in the building.

In 1942, the building's basement became the meeting place for the Bombshell Artists Group, an alliance of 60 modernist painters and sculptors, a number of whom had studios in the building. Henry Becket, writing in the New York Post newspaper on March 2, 1942, noted that "The artists meet in a cellar that they call The Bomb Shelter at 51 West 10th Street." He also stated that the Bombshell Group's "exhibition chairman" was Joseph Manfredi and the Group's first show was then on display at the Riverside Museum.

In 1956, the Tenth Street Studio Building was razed to make way for an apartment building. A penthouse apartment in the subsequently constructed apartment building, 45 West 10th Street, was purchased by the actress Julia Roberts in 2010.
