= Daniel Bagley =

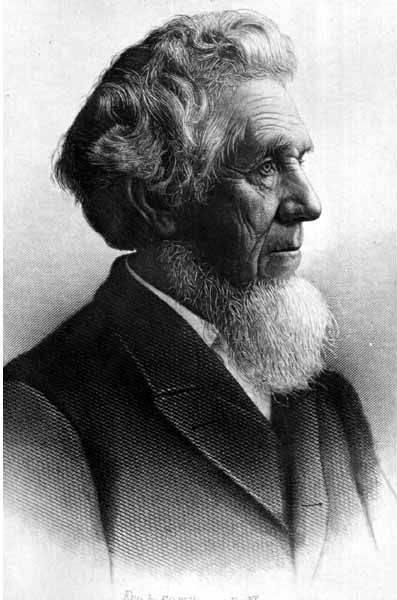
- Born: September 7, 1818; Hayfield Township, Pennsylvania
- Died: April 26, 1905 (aged 86); Seattle, Washington
- Occupation: Methodist minister
- Spouse: Susannah Rogers Whipple
- Children: Clarence Bagley

Daniel Bagley (September 7, 1818 – April 26, 1905) was a pioneer preacher, educational booster, and industrialist in Seattle, Washington. Arriving in Seattle in 1860, he was instrumental in the founding of the Territorial University of Washington. A Methodist minister, in 1865 he founded the Little Brown Church, formally known as the First Methodist Protestant Church of Seattle. He also managed the Newcastle coal mines and helped run the Lake Washington Coal Company for a time. His son, Clarence B. Bagley (1843-1932), was a prominent early Washington historian.

== Early life ==
Daniel Bagley was born on September 7, 1818, in Crawford County, Pennsylvania. He worked on his father's farm clearing the land and completing various chores. In 1840, he married Massachusetts-raised Susannah Rogers Whipple. They spent their honeymoon moving to new land in Illinois. After becoming a Methodist minister in 1842, he traveled the state of Illinois as a circuit preacher.

== Death ==
Bagley died in Seattle on April 26, 1905.

== Legacy ==
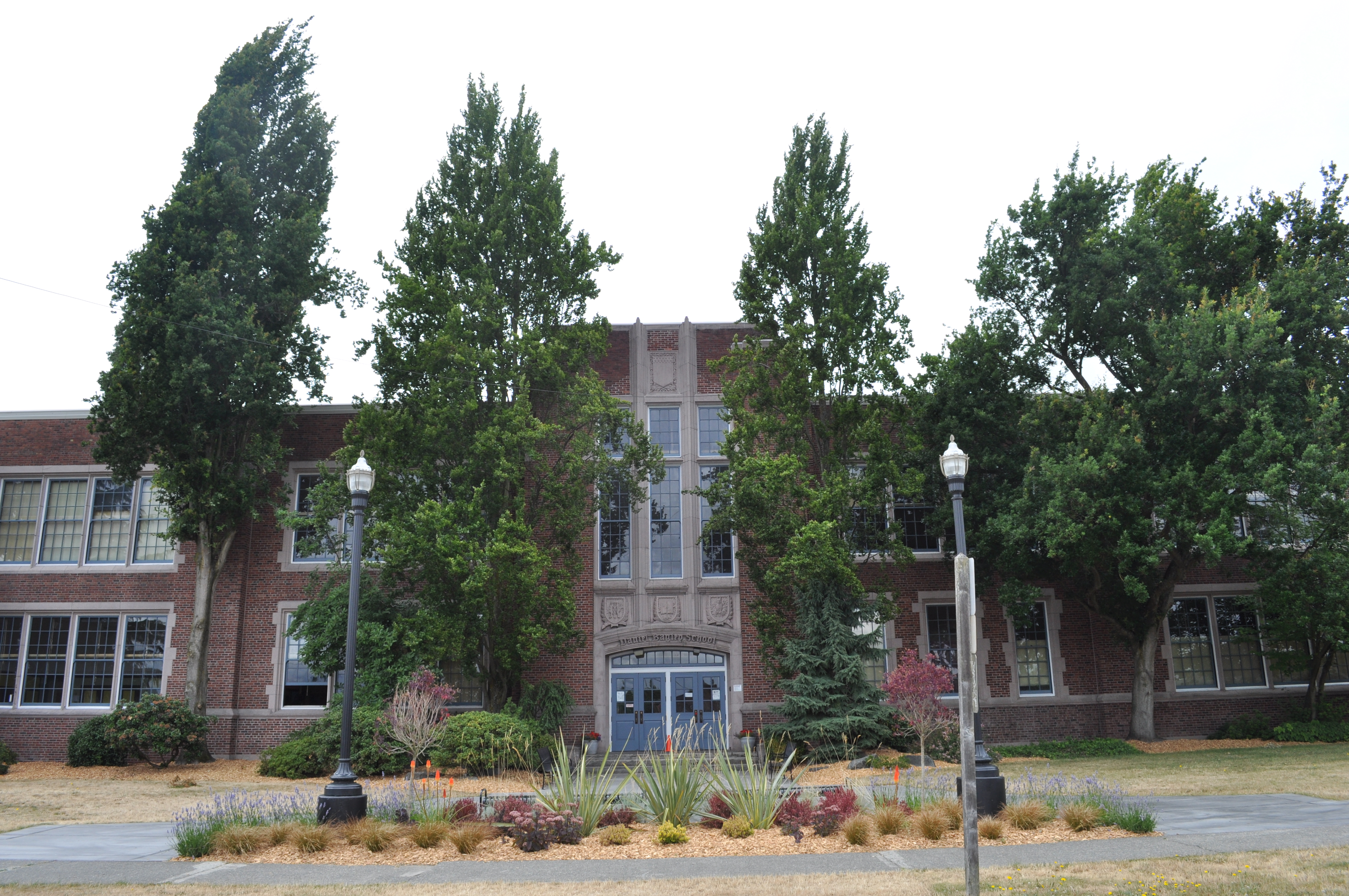
Daniel Bagley Elementary School

Bagley Avenue in Seattle, north of the shores of Lake Union, honors both Daniel Bagley and his son Clarence.

Daniel Bagley Elementary School in the Green Lake neighborhood of Seattle was officially named in honor of Daniel Bagley on March 27, 1906.

Bagley Hall at the University of Washington houses the Department of Chemistry.
