= Lenox =

Lenox may refer to:

== Places in the United States ==
- Lenox, Alabama, an unincorporated community
- Lenox, Georgia, a town
- Lenox, Iowa, a city
- Lenox, Kentucky, an unincorporated community and coal town
- Lenox, Massachusetts, a town
  - Lenox (CDP), Massachusetts, a census-designated place in the town
- Lenox, Missouri, an unincorporated community
- Lenox, New York, a town
  - Lenox Avenue, in Harlem, New York City
- Lenox, Ohio, original name of North Olmsted, Ohio
- Lenox, Oklahoma, an unincorporated community
- Lenox, Pennsylvania, an unincorporated community
- Lenox, Tennessee, an unincorporated community
- Lenox, Memphis, Tennessee, a neighborhood
- Lenox Township (disambiguation)
- Lenox Crater, near Flagstaff, Arizona

== People and fictional characters ==
- Lennox (given name), a list of people and fictional characters named Lenox or Lennox
- Lennox (surname), a list of people and fictional characters named Lenox or Lennox

== Businesses ==
- Lenox Hotel (disambiguation)
- Lenox (company), a manufacturer of bone china
- Lenox Industrial Tools, a manufacturer of saws and other cutting tools
- Lenox Square, a mall in Atlanta, Georgia

== Schools ==
- Lenox College, a former college in Hopkinton, Iowa
- Lenox School for Boys, a private preparatory school in Lenox, Massachusetts
- Lenox Hall, a former resident and day school for girls and young women in St. Louis, Missouri

== Other uses ==
- HMS Lenox, ships of the Royal Navy
- Lenox station (disambiguation)
- Lenox Library (disambiguation)
- Lenox Merchants, an American semi-professional basketball team based in Lenox, Massachusetts, from 1949 to 1959

== See also ==
- New Lenox, Illinois, United States, a village
- Lennox (disambiguation)
- Linux, the open source Unix-like operating system kernel
