= Lenox Hill =

Neighborhood of Manhattan in New York City

- Neighborhood of Manhattan
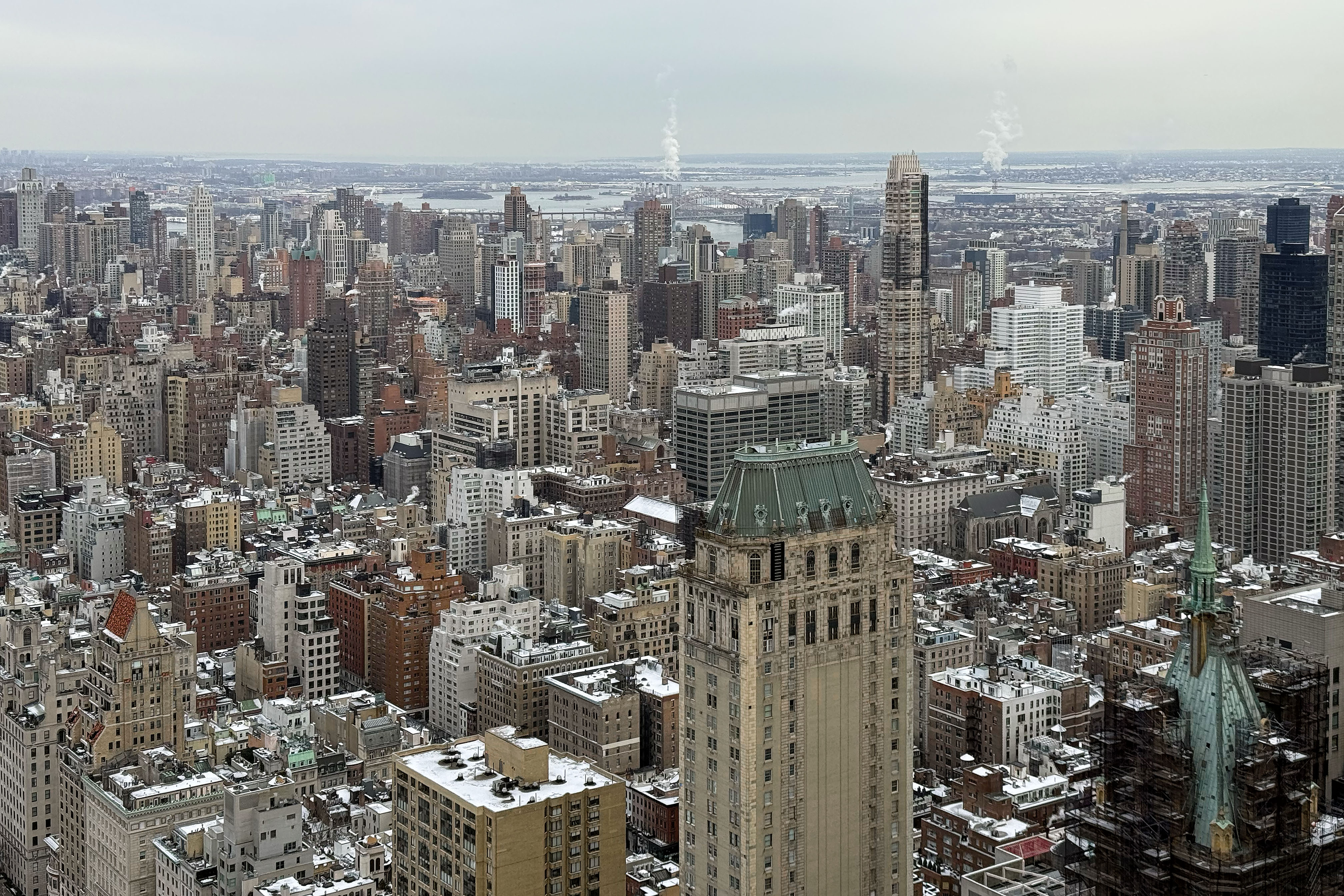
- Lenox Hill, viewed from the Solow Building
- Interactive map of Lenox Hill
- Coordinates: 40.769°N 73.962°W
- Country: United States
- State: New York
- City: New York City
- Borough: Manhattan
- Community District: Manhattan 8

Lenox Hill (/ˌlɛnəks ˈhɪl/) is a neighborhood on the Upper East Side of Manhattan in New York City. It forms the lower (southern) section of the Upper East Side, east of Park Avenue in the 60s and 70s.

A significant portion of the neighborhood lies within the Upper East Side Historic District, designated by the New York City Landmarks Preservation Commission in 1981 and expanded in 2010. The neighborhood is part of Manhattan Community Board 8.

== Geography ==
Based on the location of the original Lenox Hill, which was on a farm that spanned present-day 68th Street to 74th Street, east of Fifth Avenue, The Encyclopedia of New York City defines the neighborhood as the area between 60th Street and 77th Street, from Fifth Avenue on the west to Lexington Avenue on the east.

However, neighborhood boundaries can shift and most residents see the modern boundaries differently, as the Lenox Hill post office and the neighborhood's service-oriented retail shops are located east of Lexington Avenue. Many city maps also place Lenox Hill in the lower east section of the Upper East Side, including maps of Manhattan Community District 8, the New York City Department of City Planning, the New York City Department of Transportation, NYCityMap (by the New York City Department of Information Technology and Telecommunications), and the Friends of the Upper East Side.

== History ==
The neighborhood is named for the hill that "stood at what became 70th Street and Park Avenue." The name "Lenox" is that of the Scottish merchant settler Robert Lenox (1759-1839), who owned about 30 acres (120,000 m^{2}) of land "at the five-mile (8 km) stone", reaching from Fifth to Fourth (now Park) Avenues and from East 74th to 68th Streets. For the sum of $6,420 ($135,000 in current dollar terms) or $6,920 ($146,000) he had purchased a first set of three parcels in 1818, at an auction held at the Tontine Coffee House of mortgaged premises of Archibald Gracie, in order to protect Gracie's heirs from foreclosure, as he was executor of Gracie's estate. Several months later he purchased three further parcels, extending his property north to 74th Street. According to one source, "Thereafter these two tracts were known as the 'Lenox Farm.'" The tenant farmhouse stood on the rise of ground between Fifth and Madison avenues and 70th and 71st Streets, which would have been the hill, if the property had ever been called "Lenox Hill." The railroad right-of-way of the New York & Harlem Railroad passed along the east boundary of the property.

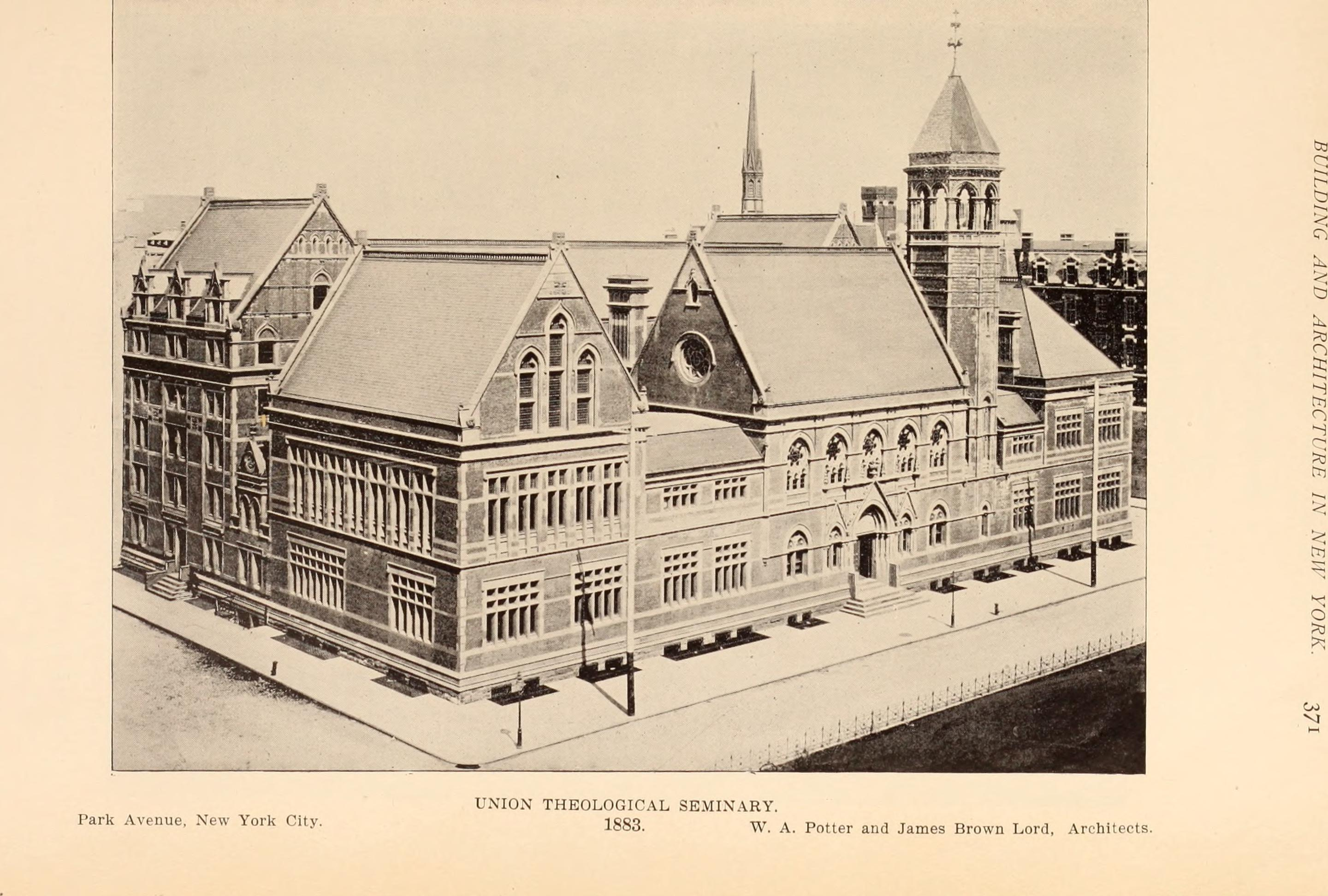
Union Theological Seminary on Park Avenue, in Lenox Hill (1883).

Robert Lenox's son James Lenox divided most of the farm into blocks of building lots and sold them during the 1860s and 1870s; he also donated land for the Union Theological Seminary along the railroad right-of-way, between 69th and 70th Streets, and just north of it a full square block between Madison and Fourth Avenue, 70th and 71st streets, for the Presbyterian Hospital, which occupied seven somewhat austere structures on the plot; He built the Lenox Library on a full block-front of Fifth Avenue, now the site of the Frick Collection.

== Structures ==
Lenox Hill Hospital, the former German Hospital, is located in this area, on East 77th Street.

Luxury residences built in the 1910s and 1920s are now very expensive. Park Avenue and Lexington Avenue both pass through Lenox Hill, and along these avenues, there are many boutiques, art galleries and five-star hotels. Museums in the area include the Frick Collection.

== Demographics ==
Based on data from the 2010 United States census, the population of Lenox Hill and Roosevelt Island, which are combined into one census tabulation area, was 80,771, an increase of 4,140 (5.4%) from the 76,631 counted in 2000. Covering an area of 511.71 acres (207.08 ha), the neighborhood had a population density of 157.8 inhabitants per acre (101,000/sq mi). The median income for a household living in Lenox Hill was $92,219.

The racial makeup of the neighborhood was 75.3% (60,831) White, 4.4% (3,571) African American, 0.1% (57) Native American, 10.6% (8,569) Asian, 0.1% (61) Pacific Islander, 0.3% (262) from other races, and 1.9% (1,558) from two or more races. Hispanic or Latino of any race was 7.3% (5,862) of the population.

The racial composition of Lenox Hill / Roosevelt Island changed moderately from 2000 to 2010. The most significant changes were the increase in the Asian population by 38% (2,346) and the increase in the Hispanic / Latino population by 22% (1,064). The White population remained the majority with a slight increase of 1% (360), while the small Black population increased by 2% (61); the even smaller population of all other races increased by 19% (309).

== Notable people ==
Residents of Lenox Hill have included:

- James Lenox (1800–1880), philanthropist, founder of Lenox Library
- Robert Lenox (1759–1839), merchant, namesake of Lenox Hill
- Andy Warhol (1928–1987), artist

== Transportation ==
Lenox Hill is serviced by three New York City Subway stations. These are the 68th Street–Hunter College station on the 6 and <6> trains; the 77th Street station on the 6 and <6> trains, and the 72nd Street station on the N, Q, and R trains; and the Lexington Avenue–63rd Street station on the Q, F and M trains. Bus routes include M1, M2, M3, M4, M15, M15 SBS, M31, M66, M72, M98, M101, M102, M103.

== See also ==
- 945 Madison Avenue
