= Lennox =

Lennox may refer to:

== Places ==
- Lennox, Nova Scotia, Canada
- Lennox County, Ontario, Canada
- Lennox (federal electoral district), a former electoral district in Ontario (1867–1904)
- The Lennox, a region of Scotland
- Lennox, California, United States
- Lennox, South Dakota, United States
- Lennox, Wisconsin, United States

== People and fictional characters ==
- Lennox (given name), a list of people and fictional characters named Lennox or Lenox
- Lennox (surname), a list of people and fictional characters surnamed Lennox or Lenox

== Titles ==
- Duke of Lennox
- Earl of Lennox
- Thane of Lennox, a subsidiary title of Earl of Perth

== Other uses ==
- HMS Lennox, two ships of the Royal Navy
- Lennox Castle, abandoned hospital near Glasgow
- Lennox Football Club, 19th-century English rugby club
- Lennox Generating Station, a power station in Ontario, Canada
- Lennox International, a global manufacturer of furnaces and central air conditioners
- Lennox Stakes, a horse race

== See also ==
- Lennox–Gastaut syndrome, a difficult-to-treat form of childhood-onset epilepsy
- Lennox and Addington, an electoral district in Ontario, Canada
- Zion & Lennox, a reggaeton music duo from Carolina, Puerto Rico
- Lenox (disambiguation)
- Linux, an open-source Unix-like operating-system kernel
