= Lennox (surname) =

Lennox or Lenox is a surname. Notable people with the surname include:

== People ==
=== Lennox ===
- Annie Lennox (born 1954), British singer
- Ari Lennox (born 1991), American singer-songwriter
- Bernard Gordon Lennox (1932–2017), British Army major general
- Betty Lennox (born 1976), American basketball player
- Bobby Lennox (born 1943), British football player
- Caroline Lennox (1723–1774), British noblewoman, later 1st Baroness Holland, eldest of the Lennox sisters
- Charles Lennox (disambiguation)
- Charlotte Lennox (1730–1804), British author
- Dave Lennox (1855–1947), American inventor and businessman
- David Lennox (1788–1873), Australian stonemason and bridge-builder
- Douglas Lennox-Silva (born 1987), Puerto Rican swimmer
- E. J. Lennox (1844–1933), Canadian architect
- Elizabeth Lennox (1894–1992), American contralto singer
- Emily Lennox (1731–1814), British noblewoman, later Duchess of Leinster, one of the Lennox sisters
- Lord George Lennox (1737–1805), British Army general and politician
- Jack Lennox (1907–1943), Australian rugby league player
- James Lennox (1899–1944), British World War I flying ace
- John Lennox (born 1943), British mathematician
- Kristina Lennox-Silva (born 1985), Puerto Rican swimmer
- Louisa Lennox (1743–1821), British-born Irish noblewoman, one of the Lennox sisters
- Louisa Berkeley, Countess of Berkeley (1694–1716), née Lennox
- Michael Lennox, British film director
- Noah Lennox (born 1978), American musician
- Lady Sarah Lennox (1745–1826), British noblewoman, one of the Lennox sisters
- Sarah Lennox, Duchess of Richmond (1706–1751), Lady of the Bedchamber to Queen Caroline and mother of the Lennox sisters
- Tristan Lennox (born 2002), Canadian ice hockey player
- Wilbraham Lennox (1830–1897), British soldier
- William Lennox (disambiguation)

=== Lenox ===
- Adriane Lenox, American actress
- Bennie Lenox (1941–2016), American college basketball player and coach
- Darryl Lenox (1966-2023), American comedian
- David Thomas Lenox (1802–1874), American pioneer in Oregon
- Jack Lenox Jr., American World War II flying ace - see List of World War II flying aces
- James Lenox (1800–1880), American bibliophile and philanthropist
- Michael Lenox (born 1971), American strategist and professor of business administration
- Robert Lenox (1759–1839), Scottish-American merchant
- Walter Lenox (1817–1874), mayor of Washington, DC
- Walter Scott Lenox (1859–1920), American founder of the Ceramic Art Company

== Fictional characters ==
- Charles Lenox, an amateur detective featured in Victorian era mystery novels by Charles Finch
- the title character of Susan Lenox (Her Fall and Rise), played by Greta Garbo
- Tabitha Lenox and Timmy Lenox, characters in the American soap opera Passions
- Tom Lennox, the White House Chief of Staff of President Wayne Palmer in the sixth season of the television series 24, played by Peter MacNicol
- William Lennox, in the Transformers film series, played by Josh Duhamel
- William Lennox, villain of the video game Black
- Xamuel Lennox, an Imperial officer in Star Wars

== See also ==
- General Lennox (disambiguation)
- Lennox (given name)
