= Lagergren (surname) =

Lagergren is a Swedish surname that may refer to

- The House of Lagergren, a family of the Swedish nobility
- Albin Lagergren (born 1992), Swedish handball player
- Joakim Lagergren (born 1991), Swedish professional golfer
- Nina Lagergren (1921–2019), Swedish businesswoman and half-sister of Raoul Wallenberg
