= Robert Lenox Kennedy =

American banker and philanthropist (1822–1887)

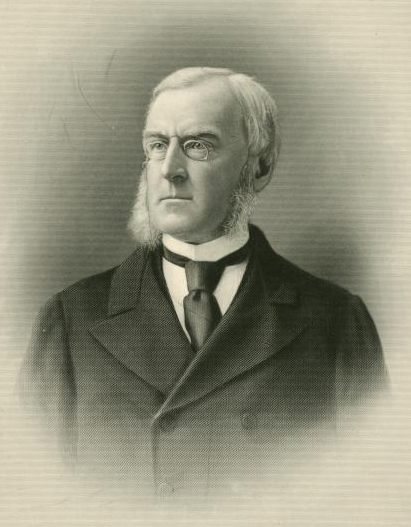
- Robert Lenox Kennedy

President of the Lenox Library
- In office 1880–1887
- Preceded by: James Lenox
- Succeeded by: John Stewart Kennedy

President of the National Bank of Commerce in New York
- In office 1868–1878
- Preceded by: Charles Handy Russell
- Succeeded by: Henry F. Vail

Personal details
- Born: November 24, 1822 New York City, New York, U.S.
- Died: September 14, 1887 (aged 64) At sea
- Spouses: Louisa Vanuxem Wurts (m. 1852; died 1877) Sophia Heatly Dulles (m. 1879)
- Relations: Robert Lenox (grandfather); James Lenox (uncle)
- Education: Columbia College

Robert Lenox Kennedy (November 24, 1822 – September 14, 1887), was an American banker and philanthropist who served as president of the National Bank of Commerce in New York and the Lenox Library.

== Early life ==
Kennedy was born in New York City on November 24, 1822. He was the eldest child of David S. Kennedy (1791–1853) and Rachel Carmer (née Lenox) Kennedy (1792–1875), who were first cousins. He had three siblings, a brother, James Lenox Kennedy (who married Cornelia Van Rensselaer, a daughter of Henry Bell Van Rensselaer); and two sisters, Rachel Lenox Kennedy, who founded the Presbyterian Rest for Convalescents, and Mary Lenox Kennedy, who both died unmarried. His father was a Scottish-American merchant and banker with Maitland & Kennedy who served as president of the Saint Andrew's Society of the State of New York.

His maternal grandparents were Robert Lenox, a Scottish-American merchant, and Rachel (née Carmer) Lenox. His maternal uncle was bibliophile and philanthropist James Lenox, from whom Kennedy inherited a portion of his estate. His paternal grandparents were Capt. John Kennedy and Mary (née Lenox) Kennedy (the sister of his maternal grandfather).

Kennedy attended and graduated from Columbia College in 1840 before studying law. He never practiced, however, and succeeded to his father's business and "assumed the various positions of trust occupied by him."

== Career ==
In 1859, Kennedy was elected a director of the National Bank of Commerce in New York and was associated with the bank until his death. At the time of the National Banking Acts of 1863 and 1864, the Bank of Commerce was the largest bank in the country. In 1868, he began serving as the bank's fourth president. The first president of the bank was Samuel Ward, followed by John Austin Stevens and Charles Handy Russell (who was also a dry goods merchant with Charles H. Russell & Co.). He retired from the presidency in 1878 but remained involved as vice-president of the Bank under his successor Henry F. Vail (who had previously founded the Bank of the Republic with Gazaway Bugg Lamar). In 1929, the bank merged into the Guaranty Trust Company of New York (which later became the Morgan Guaranty Trust Company, predecessor to J.P. Morgan & Co.).

He served as a director of many important New York institutions, including the Chemical Bank, the Bleecker Street Bank for Savings, the New-York Life and Trust Company, the Farmers' Loan and Trust Company, the Union Trust Company, the Equitable Life Assurance Society, the Louisville, New Albany, and Chicago Railway, the United Railroads of New Jersey, the Western Union Telegraph Company. In 1880, Kennedy replaced Edward Minturn of Grinnell, Minturn & Co. on the executive committee of the board of directors of the Farmers' Loan and Trust Company.

He was also a trustee of the New York Society Library, the Presbyterian Hospital and the New York Hospital, having been president of the latter, and was an active member of the Foreign and Home Missions of the Presbyterian Church. He was one of the organizers of the Union League Club and, during the U.S. Civil War he was a "strong Unionist and Republican, though he afterward took no part in politics." In 1854, Kennedy became a Fellow of the American Geographical Society and a member of its Council in 1884. He also served as the fourth president of the American Sunday School Union from 1873 to 1882. Following his uncle's death in 1880, he succeeded Lenox as president of the board of trustees of the Lenox Library. Kennedy had previously donated Mihály Munkácsy's 1878 historical genre picture The Blind Milton Dictating Paradise Lost to his Daughters (which he bought from art dealer Charles Sedelmeyer) to the Library in 1879.

== Personal life ==
Kennedy was twice married. His first marriage was in Philadelphia on October 19, 1852 to Louisa Vanuxem Wurts, a daughter of Mary (née Vanuxem) Wurts and Charles Stewart Wurts, a founder of the Delaware and Hudson Canal Company. After Louisa's death on April 26, 1877, he married Sophia Heatly Dulles, a daughter of Joseph Heatly Dulles and Margaret (née Welsh) Dulles, in Philadelphia on February 10, 1879. Sophia's brother was the Presbyterian minister and author John Welsh Dulles (the grandfather of Secretary of State John Foster Dulles and Director of Central Intelligence Allen Welsh Dulles). The couple did not have any children.

On his return voyage following a four-month sojourn to Europe in hopes of improving his health, Kennedy died aboard the Norddeutscher Lloyd steamship Trave on September 14, 1887. His funeral was held at the First Presbyterian Church on Fifth Avenue and 12th Street in Manhattan. In 1889, his personal library which included many rare works like "Aldine first editions of the classics, incunables, vellum manuscripts, historical and beautiful bindings, Americana, and other rarities" was sold at the Fifth-Avenue Art Galleries.
