= Francis Mahoney (basketball) =

American basketball player and coach (1927–2008)

Personal information
- Born: November 20, 1927 Brooklyn, New York, U.S.
- Died: April 29, 2008 (aged 80)
- Listed height: 6 ft 2 in (1.88 m)
- Listed weight: 205 lb (93 kg)

Career information
- College: Brown (1946–1950)
- NBA draft: 1950: 6th round, —
- Drafted by: Boston Celtics
- Position: Forward
- Number: 19, 16

Career history
- 1953: Boston Celtics
- 1953: Baltimore Bullets
- Stats at NBA.com
- Stats at Basketball Reference

Francis H. Mahoney (November 20, 1927 – April 29, 2008) was an American professional basketball player. He had a brief stint in the National Basketball Association (NBA) during the 1950s.

== Biography ==
Born in Brooklyn, New York, he was a 6-foot-2-inch (1.88 m) and 205 pounds (93 kg) forward and he attended Brown University, where he earned a Bachelor of Arts degree in English. He served in the U.S. Army during the Korean War from 1950 to 1952, and later in the U.S. Army Reserves until 1956. He was selected in the sixth round of the 1950 NBA draft by the Boston Celtics. He played the 1952–53 season with the Celtics, averaging 2.0 points, 1.2 rebounds and 0.2 assists per game in 6 games. His final season in the league, in 1953–54, was spent with the Baltimore Bullets, playing only two games in 11 total minutes, grabbing 2 rebounds and dishing out one assist.

After his NBA career Mahoney played for the semi-professional Lenox Merchants, and served as a basketball coach at Berkshire Community College and the former Stockbridge School. In addition, he worked as an electrician for many years, and taught English at Berkshire Community College and Monument Mountain Regional High School. He also worked for General Motors in New York City. He and his wife were depicted in a Norman Rockwell painting, Marriage License. He was a member of the Irish American Club of Berkshire County and the NBA Players Association.

Mahoney died at Springside of Pittsfield in Pittsfield, Massachusetts, aged 80. He was survived by his wife, two daughters, two sons, and eight grandchildren.

== Career statistics ==
Legend
GP	Games played	GS	Games started	MPG	Minutes per game
FG%	Field goal percentage	3P%	3-point field goal percentage	FT%	Free throw percentage
RPG	Rebounds per game	APG	Assists per game	SPG	Steals per game
BPG	Blocks per game	PPG	Points per game	**Bold**	Career high

=== NBA ===
==== Regular season ====
Year	Team	GP	MPG	FG%	FT%	RPG	APG	PPG
1952–53	Boston	**6**	**5.7**	**.400**	**.800**	**1.2**	.2	**2.0**
1953–54	Baltimore	2	5.5	.000	–	1.0	**.5**	.0
Career		8	5.6	.333	.800	1.1	.3	1.5

==== Playoffs ====
Year	Team	GP	MPG	FG%	FT%	RPG	APG	PPG
1953	Boston	4	11.3	.214	.600	1.8	.5	2.3
