= Charles Handy Russell =

American banker (1796–1884)

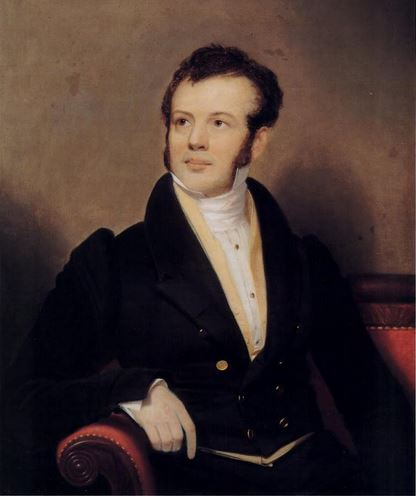
- Portrait of Russell by William Sidney Mount

President of the National Bank of Commerce in New York
- In office March 1866 – June 5, 1868
- Preceded by: John Austin Stevens
- Succeeded by: Robert Lenox Kennedy

Personal details
- Born: September 13, 1796 Newport, Rhode Island
- Died: January 21, 1884 (aged 87) New York City, New York
- Spouse(s): Ann Rodman (m. 1818; died 1842) Caroline Howland (m. 1850; died 1863)
- Relations: Jonathan Russell (cousin)
- Children: 11
- Parent(s): Ann Handy Russell; Thomas Russell
- Education: Bristol Academy
- Occupation: Merchant, banker

Charles Handy Russell (September 13, 1796 – January 21, 1884) was a prominent American merchant and banker with the National Bank of Commerce in New York.

== Early life ==
Russell was born on September 13, 1796, in Newport, Rhode Island. He was the third child and second son of Ann (née Handy) Russell and Maj. Thomas Russell, who served in the Continental Army under the Marquis de Lafayette and was a descendant of Elder William Brewster, a Mayflower passenger. His maternal grandfather was Charles Handy, a prominent merchant and landowner from Newport. Through his uncle Johnathan Russell, he was a first cousin of Jonathan Russell, a U.S. Representative from Massachusetts and U.S. Minister to Stockholm who was one of the five commissioners who negotiated the Treaty of Ghent with Great Britain in 1814, ending the War of 1812.

His father died in 1801, leaving his mother with four young children to care for. They moved to Bristol and stayed there until his mother's death in 1807 when Charles and his younger brother were under the care of the Rev. Alexander V. Griswold, later the 5th Presiding Bishop of the Episcopal Church and attended Bristol Academy.

== Career ==
He began as a clerk with Charles Potter. In 1813, Potter went into partnership with Elisha Dyer (father of future Rhode Island governor Elisha Dyer) under the name Dyer & Potter with Russell as their Providence agent. After their partnership ended, Russell again worked with Potter as his European agent. In 1817, Russell and his brother, William Henry Russell, went into the dry goods business. The following year he went into partnership with Charles Potter again under the firm name Charles Potter & Company. In 1820, the name of the firm was changed to Potter & Russell with Russell's interest in the business at two-fifths. Upon his return from Europe, where he had a special appointment with the Marquis de Lafayette, in 1821, it became one-half. When Lafayette visited Providence in 1824 during his famous tour of America, Russell welcomed him to the city. In 1825, Russell went to New York City to establish a branch of Potter & Russell under the name Potter, Russell & Co. while his brother William went to England as the representative of the firm in Europe. In 1826, Potter & Russell dissolved with Potter continuing his business in Providence while Charles and his brother formed a new partnership under the name Charles H. Russell & Co. Russell retired from the business in 1845.

=== Banking and railroad interests ===
In 1819, he was one of the incorporators of the Providence Institution for Savings. He was one of the founders of the Bank of Commerce, serving as the president of the bank from March 1866 after succeeding John Austin Stevens when the bank was converted to the National Bank of Commerce of New York. At the time of his resignation on June 5, 1868, the capital and surplus and reserved profits of the bank amounted to over $14,000,000. The directors of the Bank of Commerce during his presidency were George T. Adee, John Jacob Astor III, Denning Duer, John C. Green, Robert Lenox Kennedy, Abiel Abbot Low, Edwin D. Morgan, Adam Norrie, Robert Ray, Joseph Sampson, John A. Stevens, and R. Warren Weston.

Russell also served as a director of the Boston and Providence Railroad and the Hudson River Railroad, the New York Central Railroad, and the Pacific Mail Steamboat Company.

== Personal life ==
On April 13, 1818, Russell was married to Ann Rodman (1787–1842), a daughter of Capt. William Rodman of Providence, Rhode Island, and sister of the wife of Charles Potter. Her mother was Ann Olney, a niece of Col. Jeremiah Olney of the Revolutionary Army. Together, they were the parents of four children:

- Eliza Rodman Russell (1819–1876), who married Robert Swartwout Hone, a son of former Mayor Philip Hone. His sister Mary married John Jones Schermerhorn, brother of William Colford Schermerhorn.
- Anna Rodman Russell (1826–1845), who died unmarried.
- Cora Russell (1833–1833), who died in infancy.
- Frances "Fanny" Geraldine Russell (1836–1885), who died unmarried.

After Ann's death in 1842, he remarried to Caroline Howland on October 29, 1850. Caroline was a daughter of Samuel Shaw Howland of Howland & Aspinwall (previously G.G. & S.S. Howland) and from him she inherited a quarter of a million dollars. Her mother was the former Joanna Esther Hone (a niece of Philip Hone, the noted diarist and mayor of New York City), her brother was Joseph Howland, and her sister Catherine married architect Richard Morris Hunt. Together, Charles and Caroline were the parents of seven children, two of whom died in infancy:

- Charles Howland Russell (1851–1921), the former private secretary to Secretary of State Evarts who married Jane Brinsmade Potter, a daughter of Bishop Henry Codman Potter.
- Samuel Howland Russell (1853–1892), a civil engineer who married Elizabeth Waters Garrettson (1859–1934). (Note: Elizabeth Waters Garrettson (1859–1934) was the eldest daughter of Francis Thomas Garrettson (son of Freeborn Garrettson and Elizabeth Hutchins Walters) and Helen Jay Prime (daughter of Mary Rutherfurd Jay [the daughter of Peter Augustus Jay and Mary Rutherfurd Clarkson] and Frederick Prime [the son of Nathaniel Prime and Cornelia Sands]).)
- Caroline Alice Russell (1854–1919), who married Claes Lagergren, a Swedish nobleman, in 1891. In 1889, the hereditary title of Marquess of Lagergren was conferred on him by Pope Leo XIII.
- Joanna Hone Russell (1856–1933), who married John Winthrop Auchincloss (1853–1938) in 1881.
- Mary Grace Russell (1858–1931), who married William Strother Jones IV, a direct descendant of Gabriel Jones.

In 1836, he bought a large tract of land in Newport that later became known as Oaklawn. In 1853, he built the "Oaklawn" house there on Narragansett Avenue, which was enlarged in 1862.

His second wife died on March 7, 1863, leaving six young children who were then cared for by Fanny, his younger daughter from his first marriage. Russell died on January 21, 1884, at 417 Fifth Avenue, his residence in New York City. He was buried at Island Cemetery in Newport, Rhode Island. After his death, Oaklawn was sold to James Stillman in 1892. Stillman's two daughters were married to two sons of William Rockefeller. The house remained in the Rockefeller family until 1922 when it was demolished to make way for "Bois Doré" in 1926.

=== Descendants ===
Through his son Charles, he was a grandfather of Charles Howland Russell Jr. (1891–1965), who married Ethel King, a daughter of LeRoy King (a direct descendant of Peter Stuyvesant) and Ethel Ledyard (née Rhinelander) King (daughter of Frederic W. Rhinelander) and sister to Frederic Rhinelander King.

Through his daughter Joanna, he was a grandfather of Joseph Howland Auchincloss (1886–1968), and a great-grandfather of lawyer and writer Louis Stanton Auchincloss (1917–2010).
