= Lenox Hotel =

Hotel Lenox or Lenox Hotel or Lennox Hotel may refer to several hotels in the United States:

- Hotel Lenox, a.k.a. Hartford Hotel, a Beaux-Arts style hotel from 1899, in Ann Street Historic District, in Hartford, Connecticut
- Lenox Hotel (Lenox, Iowa), listed on the NRHP in Iowa
- The Lenox Hotel, a luxury hotel in downtown Boston, Massachusetts
- Madison-Lenox Hotel, a former hotel in Detroit, Michigan
- Lennox Hotel, a former hotel in St Louis Missouri
