= David S. Kennedy =

Scottish-American merchant and banker

David Sproat Kennedy
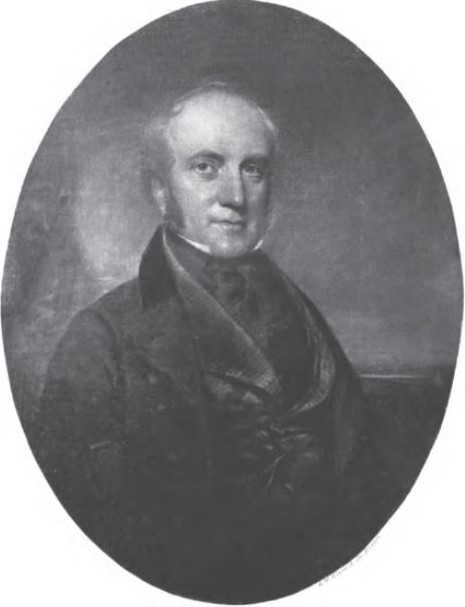

23rd President of the Saint Andrew's Society of the State of New York
- In office 1840–1842
- Preceded by: David Hadden
- Succeeded by: Richard Irvin

Personal details
- Born: 1791 Kirkcudbright, Scotland
- Died: February 2, 1853 (aged 61–62) New York City, New York, U.S.
- Spouse: Rachel Carmer Lenox (after 1822)
- Relations: Robert Lenox (uncle); James Lenox (cousin)
- Children: 4

David Sproat Kennedy (1791 – February 2, 1853) was a Scottish-American merchant and banker who served as the 23rd president of the Saint Andrew's Society of the State of New York.

== Early life ==
Kennedy was born in 1791 in the seaport town of Kirkcudbright on the southwest border of Scotland and named after his great-uncle, David Sproat. He was the son of Capt. John Kennedy and Mary (née Lenox) Kennedy.

His maternal grandparents were James Lenox and Elizabeth (née Sproat) Lenox and his uncle was merchant Robert Lenox and he was educated at the parish school in Kirkcudbright.

== Career ==
In 1807, he sailed to New York and accepted a clerkship in the merchant house set up by his uncle James Lenox in 1796 with his partner, Robert Maitland, known as Jas. Lenox & Wm. Maitland. Kennedy became partner in 1812 when the firm was known as Lenox, Maitland & Company, but in 1818, the name was changed to Kennedy & Maitland when James Lenox retired and returned to Scotland. Kennedy & Maitland was known as one of the "greatest commercial houses in the United States," and Kennedy "held a commanding position in the financial and social community."

After his father-in-law's death in 1839, Kennedy succeeded to the management of part of the large estate as well as inheriting substantial property from his uncle, James Lenox, who died unmarried, also in 1839. Kennedy also became an agent for the Bank of Montreal and several others in Canada.

Kennedy joined the Saint Andrew's Society of the State of New York in 1817, serving as Manager from 1823 to 1824 and from 1825 to 1826, second vice-president from 1827 to 1828 and president from 1840 to 1842.

== Personal life ==
On May 22, 1822, Kennedy was married to his first cousin, Rachel Carmer Lenox (1792–1875). Rachel was the sister of philanthropist James Lenox. Together, they were the parents of:

- Robert Lenox Kennedy (1822–1887), who was president of the Bank of Commerce and died at sea.
- James Lenox Kennedy (1823–1864), who married Cornelia Van Rensselaer (1836–1864), a daughter of Brig. Gen. Henry Bell Van Rensselaer.
- Rachel Lenox Kennedy (1826–1898), who founded the Presbyterian Rest for Convalescents, and died unmarried.
- Mary Lenox Kennedy (1829–1922), who died unmarried.

Between 1840 and 1845, he was painted by the American portrait artist Henry Inman, which today is owned by the New-York Historical Society.

Kennedy died at his residence on Fifth Avenue in New York City on February 2, 1853.

=== Descendants ===
Through his son James, he was the grandfather of Henry Van Rensselaer Kennedy (1863–1912), who married Marian Robbins (1862–1946).
