= Billy Harrell =

American baseball player (1928–2014)

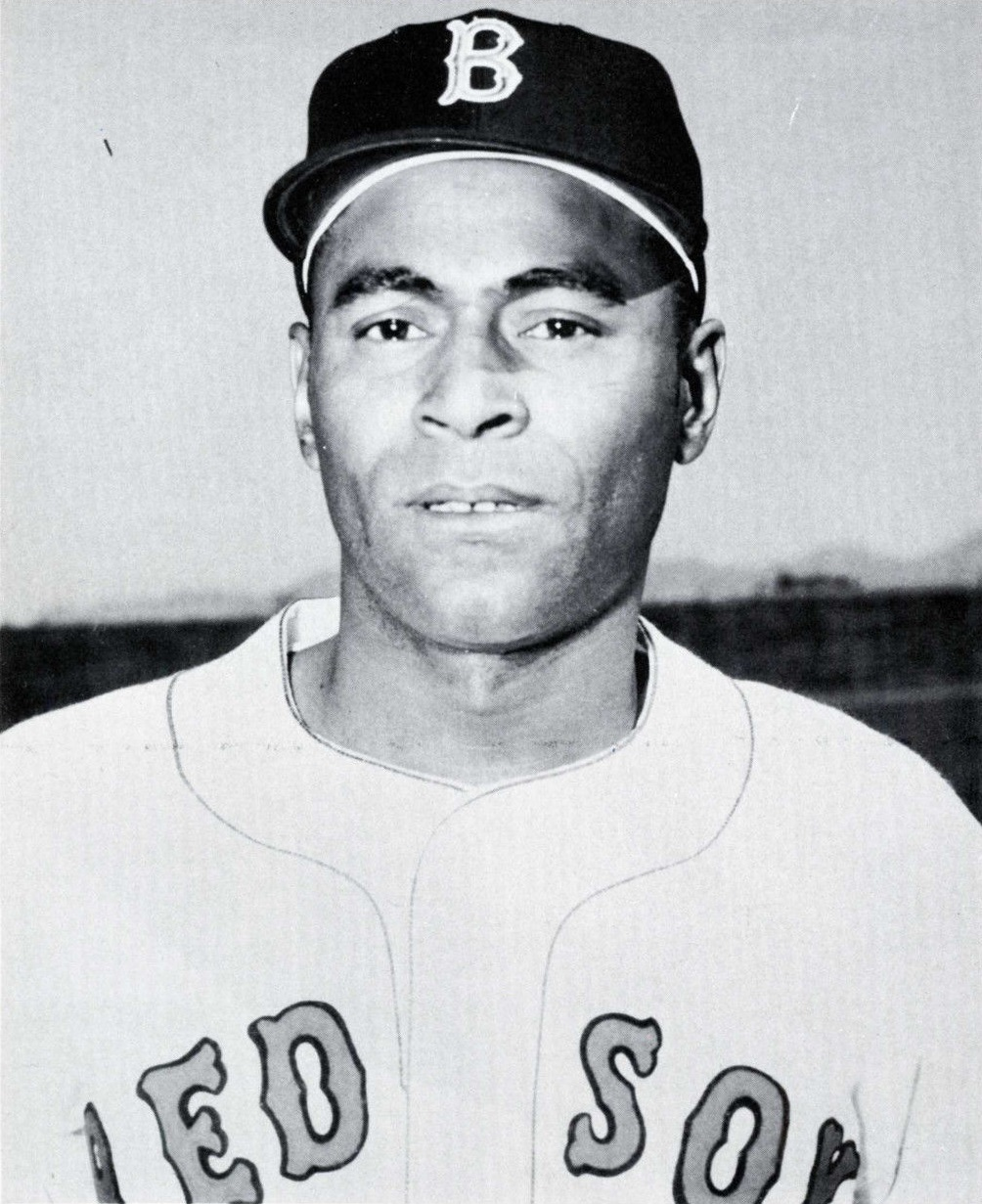
- Infielder
- Born: July 18, 1928; Norristown, Pennsylvania, U.S.
- Died: May 6, 2014 (aged 85); Albany, New York, U.S.
- Batted: Right Threw: Right

MLB debut
- September 2, 1955, for the Cleveland Indians

Last MLB appearance
- September 20, 1961, for the Boston Red Sox

MLB statistics
- Batting average: .231
- Home runs: 8
- Runs batted in: 26
- Stats at Baseball Reference

Teams
- Cleveland Indians (1955, 1957–1958); Boston Red Sox (1961)

William Harrell (July 18, 1928 – May 6, 2014) was an American reserve infielder in Major League Baseball who played between 1955 and 1961 for the Cleveland Indians (1955, 1957–1958) and Boston Red Sox (1961). Listed at 6 feet 1 inch (1.85 m), 180 pounds (82 kg), Harrell batted and threw right-handed.

Harrell attended Siena College, and began his professional career with the Negro league Birmingham Black Barons in 1951. He was signed by Cleveland in 1952.

In a four-season career, Harrell was a .231 hitter (79-for-342) with eight home runs and 26 RBI in 173 games, including 54 runs, seven doubles, one triple, and 17 stolen bases. In 151 games as an infielder, he appeared at shortstop (77), third base (62), second (8) and first (3), and also played right field in one game, posting a collective fielding percentage of .952.

After finishing his professional playing career in the Red Sox farm system in 1966, Harrell briefly served as a Boston scout.

In 1966, Harrell became the third alumnus to be inducted into the Siena Athletics Hall of Fame.

In 2000, Harrell was named by Times Union as one of the top 10 athletes for the Capital Region for the 20th Century.

== Basketball ==
Harrell played college basketball for Siena College where he left as the schools all-time leader in career points. He was drafted by the Indianapolis Olympians in the 1952 NBA draft and later played professional basketball for the Lenox Merchants in the 1950s. On January 13, 2006, Harrell became the first Siena Saints basketball player to have his jersey number (#10) retired by the school.

== Death ==
Harrell died May 6, 2014, at his home in Albany, New York. He was 85. he was buried at Oakwood Cemetery in Troy, New York.
