= Lenox Library =

Lenox Library may refer to:

- Lenox Library (Massachusetts), a public library located in Lenox, Massachusetts
- Lenox Library (New York City), a former library founded by James Lenox which was a predecessor of the New York Public Library
