= Wilberforce Eames =

American bibliographer (1855–1937)

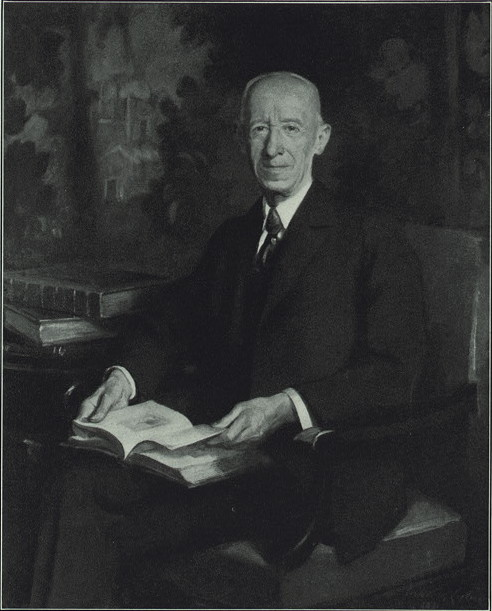
- Eames in 1931
- Born: October 12, 1855; Newark, New Jersey, U.S.
- Died: December 6, 1937 (aged 82); Brooklyn, New York, U.S.
- Occupations: Bibliographer, librarian

Wilberforce Eames (October 12, 1855 – December 6, 1937) was an American bibliographer and librarian, known as the 'Dean of American bibliographers'.

== Early life ==
Eames was born in Newark, New Jersey to Nelson and Harriet Phoebe Eames (née Crame). He spent most of his early life in Brooklyn, his family moving there in 1861 upon the death of their other son. His formal schooling ended before Eames entered high school.

He worked for the East New York Sentinel from 1870, the experience leading him to set up a small scale press in his home. Subsequently, Eames worked as a postal clerk in Brooklyn, until he was hired by bookseller Edward R. Gillespie, who employed Eames from 1873 to 1879. He was subsequently employed by N. Tibbals & Sons, Henry Miller and Charles L. Woodward until 1885. After that, he worked as a personal assistant for George Henry Moore, head of Lenox Library.

== Library work ==
After Moore's death in 1892, Eames became an assistant librarian, and eventually a full librarian at Lenox, and later, upon the merging of the Tilden trust, Astor and Lenox libraries he was appointed 'Lenox Librarian.' He became Chief of the American History Division at the New York Public Library in 1911, and Bibliographer (a position he held until his death) there in 1916. In 1924, The New York Times called Eames: "The greatest living scholar of books in America." A. S. W. Rosenbach said of Eames: "Probably the greatest student of books in the whole history of scholarship and book collecting lives quietly in New York, worshiped by every collector and scholar and unknown to the world in general- Wilberforce Eames."

Eames contributed to many bibliographies, including Joseph Sabin's Dictionary of Books relating to America. He also amassed a private book collection, counting 20,000 books in 1904, many of which were later bequeathed to and incorporated into the NYPL.

On his death the New York Times obituary headline was "Dr. Eames is dead; bibliographer, 82: noted as America's leading book authority--stricken after year's illness 40 years in library here began career as uneducated youth-wrote widely, was honored by scholars won wide recognition a golden opportunity home crammed with books he read for relaxation honored by educators."

== Honors ==
A self-taught scholar, Eames was awarded many honors.

- American Antiquarian Society in 1893.
- Harvard University. Honorary degree, 1896.
- University of Michigan. Honorary degree, 1924.
- Brown University, Honorary degree, 1924.
- Gold medal of The Bibliographical Society, 1929.
- Honors of the New York Historical Society, 1931.
- American Library Association Honorary Membership in 1933.
