= Lenox, Oklahoma =

Unincorporated community in Oklahoma, US

Coordinates: 34°41′44″N 94°49′29″W

Location of Lenox within the state of Oklahoma

Lenox is an unincorporated community in Le Flore County, Oklahoma, United States.

== History ==
A post office opened at Lenox, Indian Territory on October 2, 1896. It took its name from Lenox, Kentucky. The post office closed on April 15, 1913.

At the time of its founding, Lenox was located in Wade County, a part of the Apukshunnubbee District of the Choctaw Nation.

Lenox Mission was established nearby in 1853.
