= Charles Gordon-Lennox =

Charles Gordon-Lennox may refer to:

- Charles Gordon-Lennox, 5th Duke of Richmond and 5th Duke of Lennox (1791–1860)
- Charles Gordon-Lennox, 6th Duke of Richmond and 6th Duke of Lennox (1818–1903)
- Charles Gordon-Lennox, 7th Duke of Richmond and 7th Duke of Lennox (1845–1928)
- Charles Gordon-Lennox, 8th Duke of Richmond and 8th Duke of Lennox (1870–1935)
- Charles Gordon-Lennox, 10th Duke of Richmond 10th Duke of Lennox and 5th Duke of Gordon (1929–2017)
- Charles Gordon-Lennox, 11th Duke of Richmond (born 1955)
- Charles Gordon-Lennox, Lord Settrington (1899–1919)

== See also ==
- Charles Lennox (disambiguation)
