= William Lennox =

William Lennox may refer to:

- William Gordon Lennox (1884–1960), American neurologist
- William J. Lennox Jr. (born 1949), American army officer and president of Saint Leo University
- Lord William Lennox (1799–1881), British army officer
- William M. Lennox (1900–1991), politician from Philadelphia

== Characters ==
- William Lennox (Transformers), a character played by Josh Duhamel in the film Transformers and its sequels
- William Lennox, villain in Black video game
