= Tilden Trust =

Fund established by Samuel J. Tilden for a New York City library

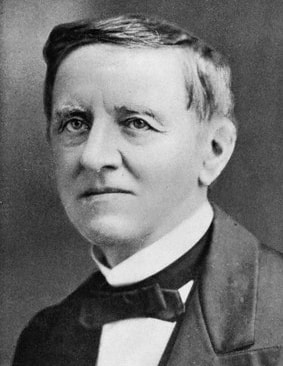
Samuel J. Tilden

The Tilden Trust was a fund established in the will of Samuel J. Tilden upon his death on August 4, 1886. The will, dated April 23, 1884, provided for the establishment of a 'Tilden Trust' to "establish and maintain a free library and reading room in the City of New York." The estate Tilden left was valued at almost $10 million, consisted of $200,000 invested in iron mines in both New York and Michigan; another $200,000 was invested in real estate. A further $1 million was left to Tilden's relatives, and a total of $110,000 was dedicated to providing municipal services to New Lebanon, New York, and Yonkers, New York. The remainder, a balance of about $5 million was left to the library.

George H. Tilden, a nephew of Samuel Tilden, filed a lawsuit in the New York State Supreme Court; soon followed by many other Tilden relatives. The relatives contested the 35th clause of the will, which established the Tilden Trust. The case ended in October 1891, when the New York Court of Appeals declared the clause invalid. Under the ruling, all of the money left by Tilden was to go to his descendants. Through several legal deals, the trust was still founded, and had a fund of two and a quarter million dollars. By that time, the money was not enough to fund a complete library, and in 1895, the Tilden Trust was merged with the Lenox Library and Astor Library to form the New York Public Library.

== Background ==
Tilden's family was in the patent medicine business and became wealthy through sales of Tilden's Extract, a popular drug derived from cannabis. Tilden, a politician who served as the 25th Governor of New York and was the Democratic candidate for president in the disputed election of 1876, was a skilled corporate attorney and financial manager who invested in a variety of commodities and financial instruments, including iron mines, real estate, and stocks and bonds. He is the only individual to win an outright majority of the popular vote in a United States presidential election but lose the election itself.

== Will ==
Samuel Jones Tilden died on August 4, 1886. He left behind an estate valued at almost 10 million dollars. The will had 43 clauses, the first 32 of which dealt with relatives. Small amounts of money, ranging from $15,000 to $150,000 were left to various heirs, including Mary B. Pelton, Lucy F. Tilden, Susan G. Tilden, Caroline B. Whittlesey, Henrietta Swan, George H. Tilden, Samuel J. Tilden II, Ruby S. Tilden, Susan G. Tilden, Anna J. Gould, Mary Stauffer, and Henrietta Jones. The 33rd clause left $115,000 to the establishment of a library in New Lebanon, New York. The 34th clause was much the same as the 33rd, and established a library in Yonkers, New York. The 35th clause left the majority of his money for the establishment of a library in New York City. The other clauses funded upkeep of the New Lebanon Cemetery, and dealt with various legal aspects of the other clauses. The will was dated April 23, 1884, and signed in the presence of Edward H. Dixon and Charles E. Simmons.

I request you [the executors] to cause to be incorporated an institution to be called the ' Tilden Trust,' with capacity to maintain a free library and reading-room in the city of New York, and such other educational and scientific objects as you shall designate; and if you deem it expedient — that is, if you think it advisable and the fit and proper thing to do — convey to that institution all or such part of my residuary estate as you choose ; and if you do not think that course advisable, then apply it to such charitable, educational, and scientific purposes as, in your judgment, will most substantially benefit mankind.

— Samuel J. Tilden

== History ==
=== Formation of the Trust ===
The Tilden Trust was formally established by an act of the New York State Legislature, which passed on March 26, 1887. The act established the Trust with three permanent trustees who were able to appoint other trustees. The three appointed for life were, Andrew H. Green, George W. Smith, and John Bigelow. In 1893, two additional trustees were appointed, Alexander E. Orr and Stephen Walker, the latter of whom would die that same year. After Walkers death, Lewis Cass Ledyard was appointed to fill his vacancy.

=== Legal Challenges ===
Soon after the release of the will, various relatives of Tilden, led by George H. Tilden filed suit. The New York State Supreme Court upheld the validity of the will in 1889, but later that year reversed the decision. The Tilden Trust subsequently appealed the ruling. The New York Court of Appeals had yet to rule on the case when the Trust settled with one of the litigants. For a payment of $975,000, she gave up her claim to the Tilden estate. On October 27, 1891, the Court of Appeals sustained the ruling of the State Supreme Court.

The Tilden Trust later settled with the other relatives on March 30, 1892. Under the settlement, the Trust received the various literary holdings of Tilden, real estate, and other various investments valued at a total of almost $2,000,000.
