= Lenox Station =

Lenox station may refer to:

- Lenox station (MARTA), a rapid transit station in Atlanta, Georgia
- Lenox station (Massachusetts), a former train station in Lenox, Massachusetts
