= Lenox Hotel (Lenox, Iowa) =

- U.S. National Register of Historic Places
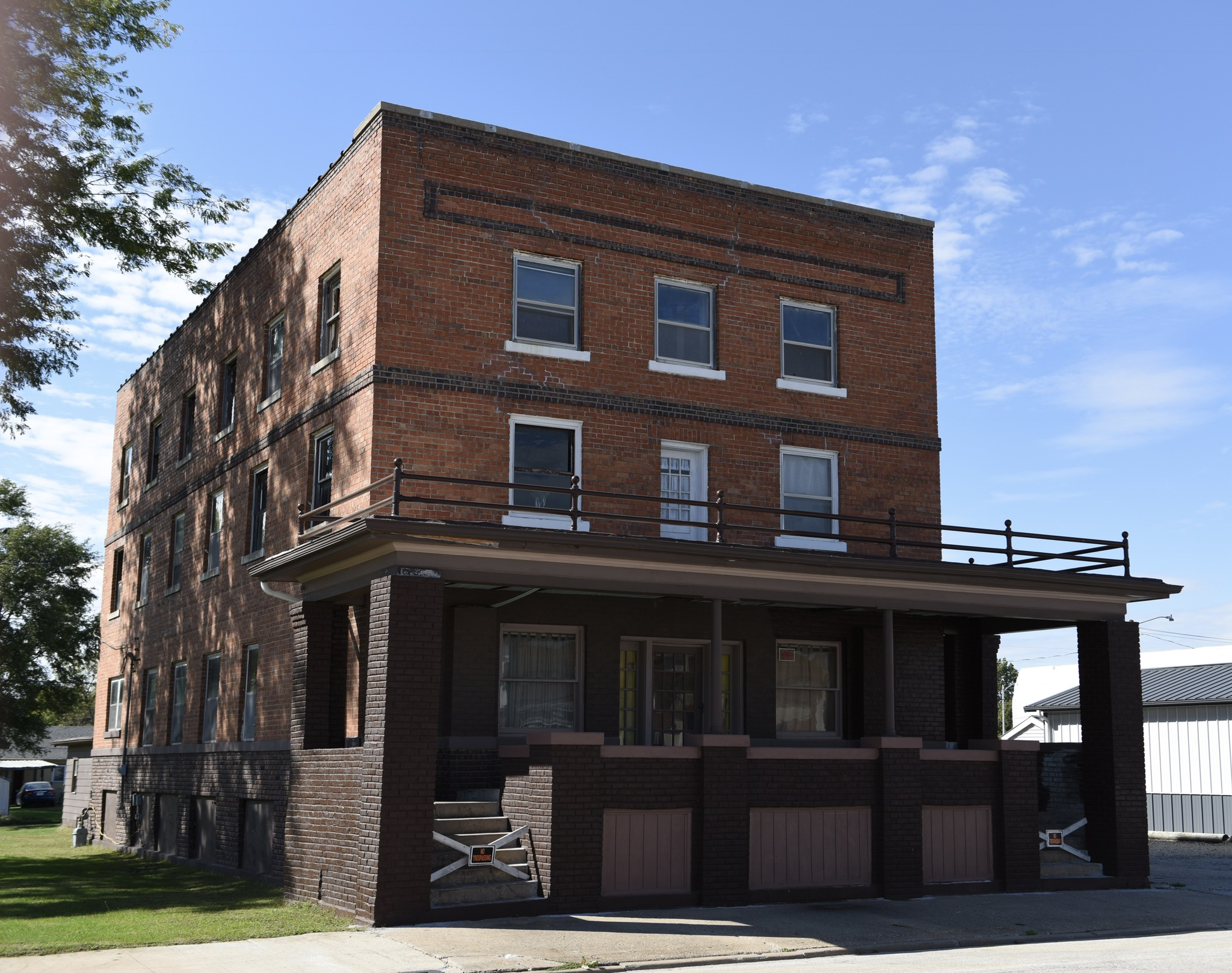

- Location within Iowa Location within the United States
- Location: 114 S. Main St. Lenox, Iowa
- Coordinates: 40°52′51″N 94°33′33″W
- Area: less than one acre
- Built: 1915-1916
- Built by: Vern Dunlap
- Architect: Vern Dunlap
- Architectural style: Late 19th and Early 20th Century American Movements
- NRHP reference No.: 02001538
- Added to NRHP: December 20, 2002

The Lenox Hotel is a historic building located in Lenox, Iowa, United States. The original Lenox hotel had been built in 1874, and was destroyed in a fire in 1912. Local businessmen formed the Lenox Hotel Company to construct a new building in its place. Vern Dunlap was the general contractor who built the new hotel, which was completed in 1916. An addition was built onto the back of the building sometime in the 1960s. The lower level commercial space housed the White Way Cafe from 1942 until it closed in 1979. The building was listed on the National Register of Historic Places in 2002. The Lenox hotel is a three-story brick structure with a prominent front porch. The porch is elevated 3.5 feet (1.1 m) above the street level, and it features a double staircase.
