= Lenox Merchants =

- Founded: 1949
- Dissolved: 1959
- Location: Lenox, Massachusetts

Lenox Merchants were an American semi-professional basketball team based in Lenox, Massachusetts. Founded in 1949 by William "Butch" Gregory, it regularly played exhibition games against NBA teams. During the 1954–1955 season, the Merchants beat the soon-to-be NBA champions, the Syracuse Nationals, twice, and scored victories against the Minneapolis Lakers and the Milwaukee Hawks.

== Notable players ==
- Glenn Bissell
- Tom Brennan
- John Burke
- Gerald Calabrese
- Fred Diute
- George Feigenbaum
- Ray Felix
- Billy Harrell
- Bob Knight
- Francis Mahoney
- Al McGuire
- Boris Nachamkin
- Ronnie Shavlik
- Zeke Sinicola
- Dick Surhoff
- Skippy Whitaker
