= Lagergren =

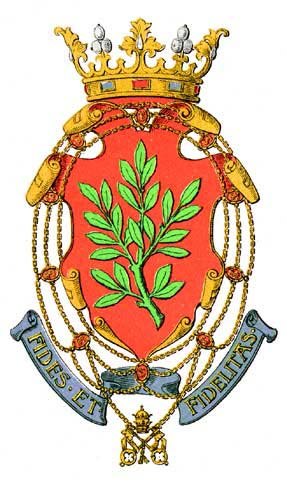
Lagergren Coat of the Arms

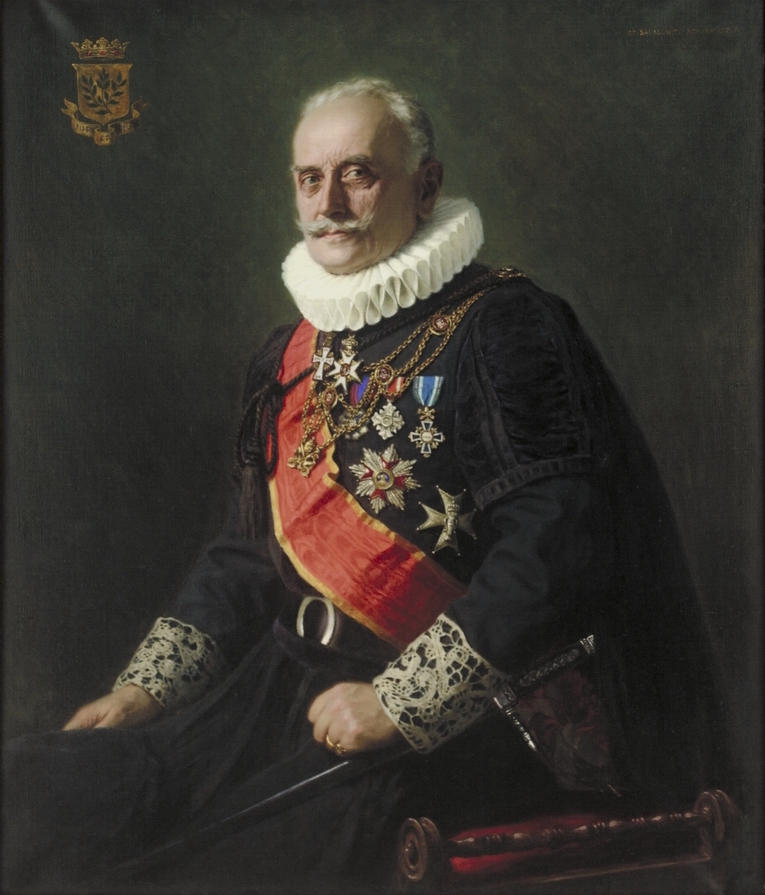
Portrait of Claes Lagergren by Stefan Bakałowicz, 1930.

The Lagergren family is a Vatican noble family of Swedish origin, descending from Claes Lagergren (1853–1930), a papal chamberlain and wealthy socialite on whom was conferred the rank of marquess by Pope Leo XIII in 1889. A junior branch of the family is descended from one of his younger sons, and holds the title of count, which was granted by Pope Pius X in 1904. Claes Lagergren owned Tyresö Palace and rebuilt the castle, inspired by original drawings from the 17th century; in his will he left the palace to the Nordic Museum.

== History ==
Claes Eric Philip Frans Joseph Leo Lagergren (1853–1930) converted to Catholicism in 1880 and became a papal chamberlain in 1884, serving under Pope Leo XIII, Pope Pius X, Pope Benedict XV, and Pope Pius XI. He was conferred the hereditary title of Marquess of Lagergren by Pope Leo XIII in 1889. The title is inherited according to extended agnatic primogeniture, meaning that title is held by both the senior male line descendant and the next in line (typically his eldest son) simultaneously. Claes Lagergren married Caroline Alice Maria Beatrice Claudia Russell (1854–1919), on 6 May 1891 in Rome, and had three sons:

- Claes Leo Alexander Carl Erik Johan Axel Claesson Lagergren (1892–1961), Marquis (from 1892), papal chamberlain
- Leo Johan Arthur Louis Josef Gustaf Howland Claesson Lagergren (1898–1975), Count (from 1904), papal chamberlain
- Leo Carl Gustaf Paul Johan Dionysius Claesson Lagergren (1899–1931), Count (from 1904), Lieutenant

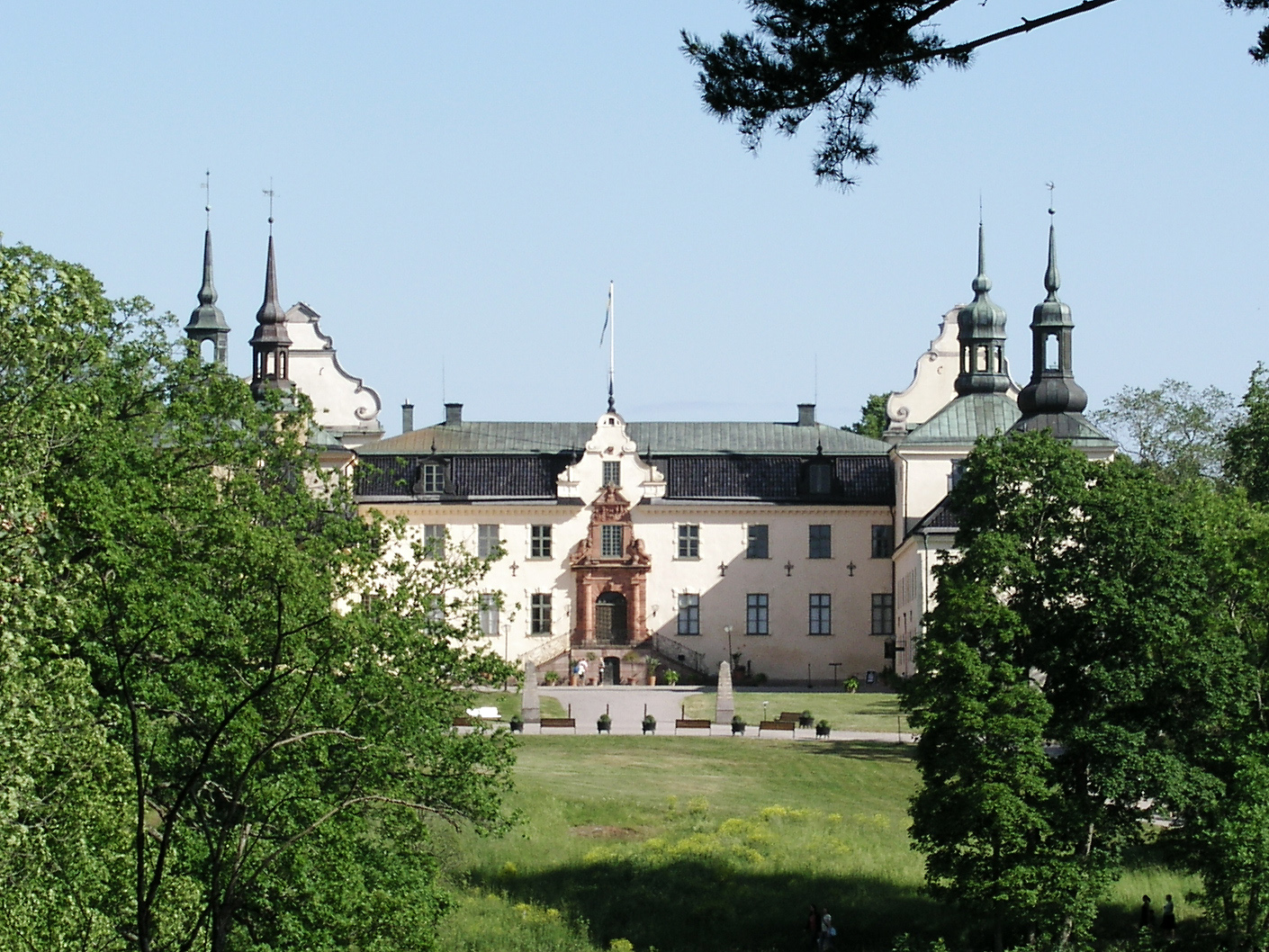
Tyresö Palace

In 1904, the younger sons Johan and Carl were both conferred the hereditary title of Count of Lagergren by Pope Pius X. The two comital titles are inherited according to normal agnatic primogeniture, meaning that the titles are held by the senior male line descendant of each of them. The head of the family by male primogeniture is the only person entitled to the title (unless the brief granting the title states otherwise). Consequently, the head of the family will bear the title before his surname, without a mention of his first name. E.g. Count Lagergren.

All other cadets, as long as they fulfil the two requirements defined by the 1904 Papal brief, that is 1) being descended from the first bearer of the title, through an uninterrupted succession of ancestors legitimately wed under Catholic rules. 2) and having never left the Catholic religion, are entitled to the mention “noble of the Counts Lagergren” after their surname are therefore entitled to be introduced by mentioning their ancestor's title, immediately followed by their first name and then their surname, to differentiate them from the head of the family as per the rules of Consulta Araldica

The titles were legally recognized by Italy 1929–1948, and remain legally recognized by the Holy See. In Sweden, the family is considered part of the unintroduced nobility, being one of very few families to hold a rank above Count and the only Swedish-origined family ever to hold the title of Marquis.

Claes Lagergren was part of the circle around King Oscar II of Sweden, and had good connections to Catholic conservative elite circles in Rome. His wife's inheritance made it possible for him to buy Tyresö Palace in 1892, which he rebuilt inspired by original drawings from the 17th century in a national romantic style. In 1922, three years after the death of his first wife, he married Mary Moore Ogden (1856–1933, granddaughter of Clement Clarke Moore and great-granddaughter of Abraham Ogden), who was also a wealthy American heiress and whose funds made it possible for him to rebuild the castle. In accordance with his last will and testament, his widow left the estate to the Nordic Museum.

The ancestors of Claes Lagergren in the 18th and 19th centuries were parish priests, landowners, and surveyors.

== Marquesses of Lagergren ==
- Claes Eric Philip Frans Joseph Leo Lagergren (1853–1930), Marquis 1889–1930
- Claes Leo Alexander Carl Erik Johan Axel Claesson Lagergren (1892–1961), Marquis 1892–1961
- Claes Lagergren (1940–2016), Marquis 1940–2016
- Claes Lagergren (born 1960), Marquis since 2016
  - Claes Lagergren (born 1992), the former's son and heir

== Counts of Lagergren ==
- Johan Lagergren (1898–1975), elevated to the hereditary rank of Count in 1904.
- Gustaf-Erik Lagergren (1932–2000), who became Count Lagergren from 1975.
- Carl-Gustaf Lagergren (1960-2013). Count Lagergren from 2000
- Johan-Arthur H L Lagergren (1936) Count Lagergren from 2013
- Carl Lagergren (1899–1931), elevated to the hereditary rank of Count in 1904, did not have male line descendants.

== Literature ==
- Lagergren, C, Mitt livs Minnen, 1–9 (memoarverk för perioden fram till 1888), 1922–1930.
- Lagergren, C, Kronor av guld och törne, 1923.
- Lagergren, C, En vinter på Nilen, 1888.
- Lagergren, C, Mot resans slut (Efterlämnade dagboksanteckningar 1888–1906) del 1, 1940.
- Lagergren, C, Mot resans slut (Efterlämnade dagboksanteckningar 1907–1930) del 2, 1953.
