= Charles Lennox =

Charles Lennox may refer to:

- Charles Lennox, 1st Duke of Richmond and 1st Duke of Lennox (1672-1723)
- Charles Lennox, 2nd Duke of Richmond and 2nd Duke of Lennox (1701-1750)
- Charles Lennox, 3rd Duke of Richmond and 3rd Duke of Lennox (1734-1806)
- Charles Lennox, 4th Duke of Richmond and 4th Duke of Lennox (1764-1819)
- Charles Lenox, the amateur detective featured in Victorian era mystery novels by Charles Finch

== See also ==
- Charles Gordon-Lennox (disambiguation)
