= HMS Lenox =

Two ships of the Royal Navy have borne the name HMS Lenox:

- HMS Lenox (1678) was a 70-gun third rate launched in 1678. She was rebuilt in 1701, and again in 1723, before being sunk as a breakwater in Sheerness in 1756.
- HMS Lenox (1758) was a 74-gun third rate launched in 1758. She was sunk as a breakwater in 1784, before being raised and broken up in 1789.

== See also ==
- Royal Navy ships named HMS Lennox
