= HMS Lennox =

Two ships of the Royal Navy have borne the name HMS Lennox, probably after the historic Scottish region of Lennox, and its associated Duchy and Earldom:

- HMS Lennox (1914) was a Laforey-class destroyer, laid down as HMS Portia, but renamed HMS Lennox in 1913, before being launched in 1914. She was sold in 1921.
- HMS Lennox (J276) was an Algerine-class minesweeper. She was ordered in 1939, but the order was cancelled and transferred to another shipyard. Lennox was eventually launched in 1943, and was broken up in 1961.

== See also ==
- Royal Navy ships named HMS Lenox
