= General Lennox =

General Lennox may refer to:

- Bernard Gordon Lennox (1932–2017), British Army major-general
- Charles Lennox, 2nd Duke of Richmond (1701–1750), British Army lieutenant-general
- Charles Lennox, 3rd Duke of Richmond (1735–1806), British Army general
- Charles Lennox, 4th Duke of Richmond (1764–1819), British Army general
- Lord George Lennox (1737–1805), British Army general
- Wilbraham Lennox (1830–1897), British Army lieutenant general
- William J. Lennox Jr. (born 1949), U.S. Army lieutenant general
