= Little Girl Observing Lovers on a Train =

1944 painting by Norman Rockwell

Little Girl Observing Lovers on a Train

Little Girl Observing Lovers on a Train, also known as Travel Experience or Voyeur, is a painting by American illustrator Norman Rockwell. It was originally created for the cover of The Saturday Evening Post on 12 August 1944.

== Background ==
Rockwell came up with the idea for the painting when traveling by train with servicemen and their families. The models posed for the reference photos in an unused rail car on a siding of the Rutland Railway. Rockwell was displeased with the area around the heads of the couple in his sketch that led to the final painting and covered the area with an additional sheet of paper to get the couple's pose right.

== Painting ==
Little Girl Observing Lovers on a Train depicts a crowded passenger train car. A young faceless couple can be seen cuddling in one of the seats; their heads are together and their legs are intertwined on top of some luggage in the seat facing directly in front of them. The man's Army Air Force jacket hangs above the couple. The focus point of the painting is a six-year-old girl in the seat in front of the couple who is next to her mother. Unnoticed by the pair, she is kneeling on her seat and watching them. She appears to be uninterested in the intimate moment. The arm of the conductor, with a ticket in hand, can be seen in the background. The "Dixie Cup" hat of a United States Navy Sailor and the hair of his partner can be seen in the seat behind the couple.

Popular-art historian Christopher Finch found the painting to be a good example of Rockwell's matured style and compared the painting to a Henri Cartier-Bresson photo.

The painting has been in the permanent collection of the Memorial Art Gallery in Rochester, New York since 1974.

The pencil sketch for this painting is in the personal collection of George Lucas and was included in fellow filmmaker Steven Spielberg's and his 2010 show at the Smithsonian American Art Museum.
