= Lenox Township =

Lenox Township may refer to the following places in the United States:

- Lenox Township, Warren County, Illinois
- Lenox Township, Iowa County, Iowa
- Lenox Township, Michigan
- Lenox Township, Ashtabula County, Ohio
- Lenox Township, Pennsylvania
