= Lennox (given name) =

Lennox or Lenox is the given name of:

== People ==
=== Lennox ===
- Lennox Alves (born 1956), Guyanese cricketer
- Lennox Berkeley (1903–1989), British composer
- Lennox Blackmoore (born 1950), Guyanese boxer
- Lennox Broster (1889–1965), South African surgeon
- Lennox Cato (born 1961), British antiques dealer
- Lennox Clarke (born 1991), English professional boxer
- Lennox Cowie (born 1950), British astronomer
- Lennox Gordon (born 1978), American football player
- Lennox Grafton (1919–2017), one of the first women to be trained as an architect in Canada
- Lennox Lagu (1938–2011), South African general
- Lennox Lewis (born 1965), British boxer
- Lennox Miller (1946–2004), Jamaican athlete
- Lennox Mohammed, Trinidadian musician
- Lennox Napier (1928–2020), British Army officer
- Lennox Pawle (1872–1936), British actor
- Lennox Raphael (born 1939), Trinidadian writer
- Lennox Robinson (1886–1958), Irish writer
- Lennox Sebe (1926–1994), South African politician
- Lennox Sharpe (born 1953), Trinidadian musician
- Lennox Yearwood (born 1969), American activist

=== Lenox ===
- Lenox Baker (1902–1995), American orthopedic surgeon and athletic trainer
- Lenox Hewitt (1917–2020), Australian public servant
- Lenox Paul (born 1958), English bobsledder
- Lenox Shuman (born 1973), Guyanese politician

== Origin ==
The name Lennox (alternatively Lenox) comes from Scotland, originating from the identical surname, which initially referred to a person hailing from the district of the Lennox (Scottish Gaelic Leamhnachd) centred on the Vale of Leven. It would have entered use as a given name through Presbyterian naming practices.

== Fictional characters ==
- Lennox (Legends of Chima), a character in Legends of Chima
- Lennox Elizabeth Scanlon, a teenage girl character from the TV show Melissa & Joey, played by Taylor Spreitler
- Lennox (Macbeth), one of the Thanes featured in Shakespeare's Macbeth

== See also ==
- Lennox (surname)
