= Lenox, Kentucky =

Unincorporated community in Kentucky, United States

- Unincorporated community
- Location within Kentucky Location within the United States
- Coordinates: 37°57′26″N 83°12′5″W
- Country: United States
- State: Kentucky
- County: Morgan
- Elevation: 797 ft (243 m)
- Time zone: UTC-5 (Eastern (EST))
  - Summer (DST): UTC-4 (EDT)
- ZIP codes: 41447
- GNIS feature ID: 508445

Lenox is an unincorporated community and coal town in Morgan County, Kentucky, United States. It lies along Route 172, northeast of the city of West Liberty, the county seat of Morgan County. Its elevation is 797 feet (243 m).
