= Lenox Library (New York City) =

Library in New York City (1870–1912)

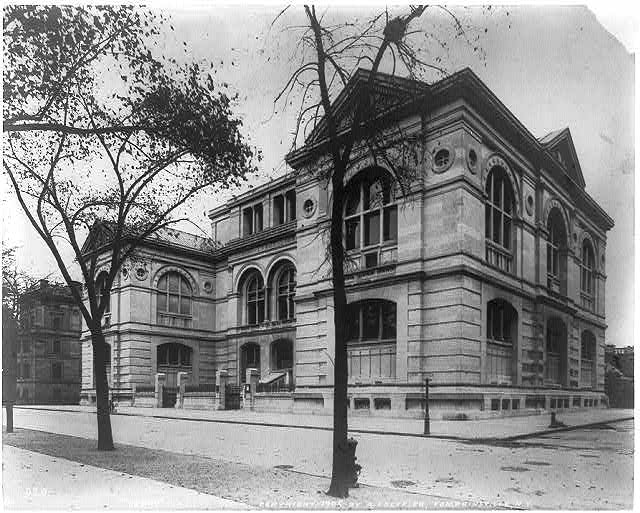
- Lenox Library, View from the corner of Fifth Avenue and 70th Street
- Interactive map of the Lenox Library area

General information
- Status: Demolished
- Type: Library
- Architectural style: Neo-Grec, Modern Classic
- Location: 1001 Fifth Avenue, New York, NY 10021, United States
- Coordinates: 40°46′17″N 73°58′03″W
- Construction started: 1871
- Completed: 1877
- Demolished: 1912

Technical details
- Floor count: 2.5

Design and construction
- Architect: Richard Morris Hunt

The Lenox Library was a library incorporated and endowed in 1870. It was both an architectural and intellectual landmark in Gilded Age–era New York City. It was founded by bibliophile and philanthropist James Lenox, and located on Fifth Avenue between 70th and 71st Streets on the Upper East Side of Manhattan. Architect Richard Morris Hunt designed the building, which was considered one of the city's most notable buildings until its destruction in 1912.

The library's collection of Bibles was unsurpassed and included the first Gutenberg Bible to cross the Atlantic. It was also known for its collection of Shakespeare, Milton, and early American literature. The library became a part of the founding collection of the New York Public Library (NYPL) in 1895, and it opened to the public as part of the NYPL's Main Branch in 1911.

== Early history ==
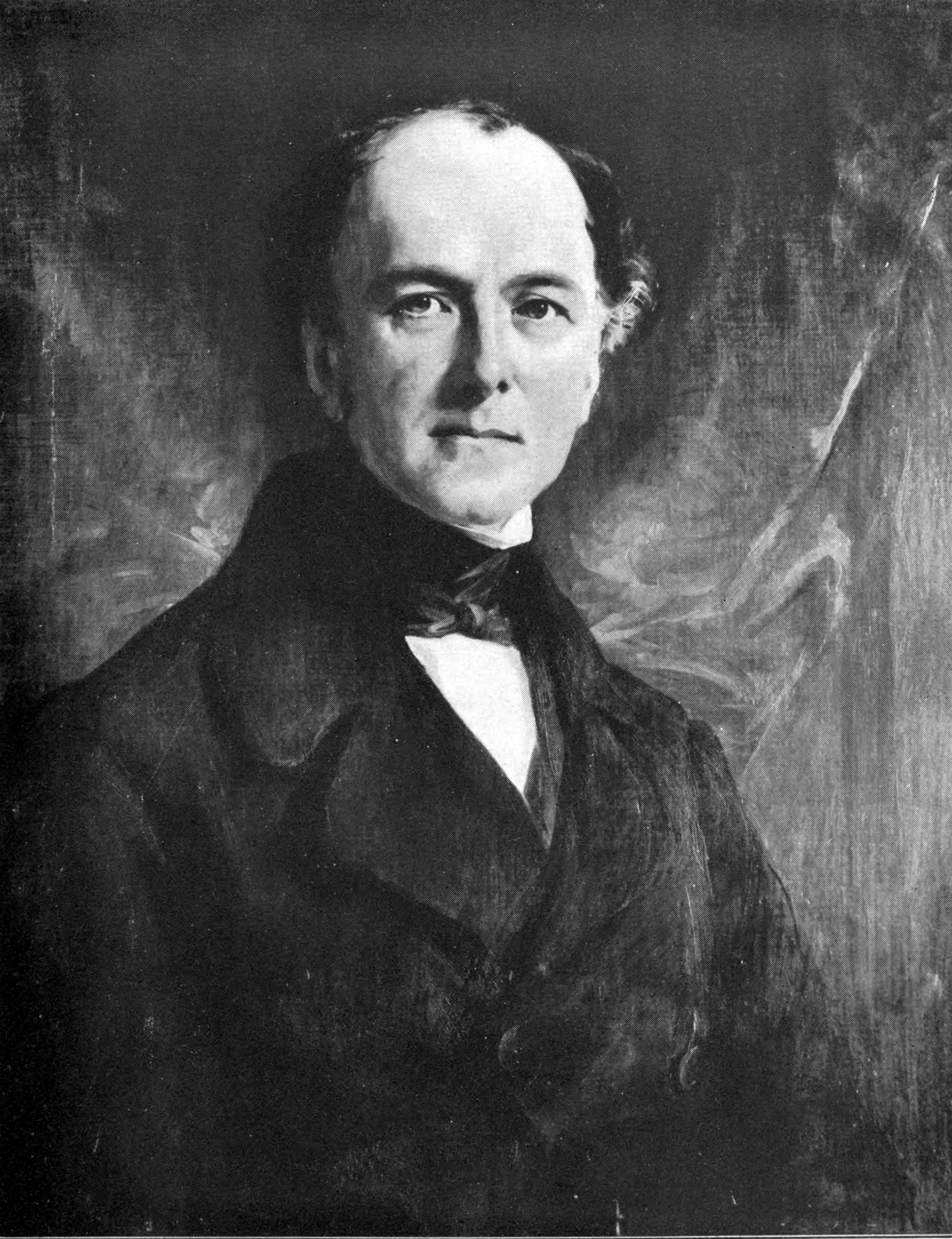
G.P.A. Healy, "Portrait of James Lenox," 1851.

The Lenox Library began as the personal collection of James Lenox, housed in his home at 53 Fifth Avenue, on the corner of Fifth Avenue and 12th Street. Lenox began collecting—principally books, but also fine paintings and sculpture—around 1845. He kept his books piled in the rooms of his townhouse, not on shelves or according to any organized system, until the overcrowding and inaccessibility of the collection inspired him to build a separate institution with the express purpose of housing it.

He worked briefly with the London literary agency Wiley & Putnam, and then with Henry Stevens of Vermont, for the next thirty-five years, until his death. Stevens worked mostly in Europe, locating fine and rare volumes for the growing Lenox collection. He bought them and sold them to Lenox with a ten percent commission.

== Construction and opening ==
The Lenox Library was incorporated by an act of the New York State Legislature on January 20, 1870. The nine named trustees were James Lenox, William H. Aspinwall, Hamilton Fish, Robert Ray, Alexander Van Rensselaer, Daniel Huntington, John Sheafe, James Donaldson, and Aaron Belknap. Lenox built his library on a lot on Fifth Avenue between 70th and 71st streets. James Lenox had inherited some thirty acres of farmland between 68th and 73rd streets and Fifth and Madison avenues from his father, Robert, in 1839. Even after the construction of the Lenox Library, the Lenox farm continued operations in the surrounding lots. Robert Lenox advised his son before his death not to sell the land too soon, for he predicted the city would expand uptown towards his land and raise its value. He was correct, and when James Lenox did choose to sell some of his land in lots to wealthy homebuilders, he made a great deal of money.

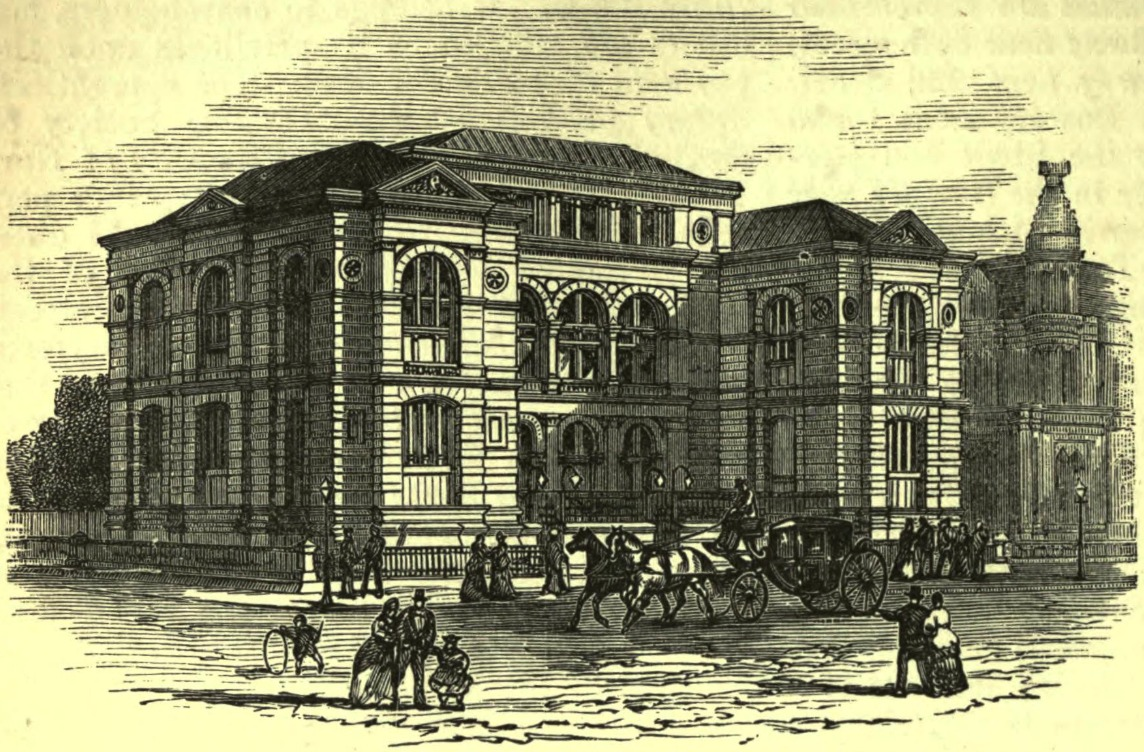
Lenox Library, 1879, "The American Cyclopædia"

Lenox hired architect Richard Morris Hunt to design his library in 1870, and by March 1871 work had begun on the foundation. Work progressed slowly from there, and it was not completed until 1877. Designed in the Neo-Grec style, the library was considered one of New York City's greatest architectural works at the time of its completion at a cost of over $510,000 (equivalent to $13.8 million in 2024), with the land valued at nearly the same amount. It was a fire-proof structure, with outside walls of Lockport limestone, with a front of 200 feet and a depth of 114 feet. It contained four spacious reading rooms, a gallery for paintings, and another for sculpture.

The galleries of paintings and sculpture opened to the public on January 15, 1877, and the rare book rooms opened later that year. The reading room was not available to the public until 1880. Even in 1880, none of these resources were easily accessible to all. The first librarian, Samuel Austin Allibone, was appointed in 1879. On November 7, 1887, the library ceased requiring admission tickets, and the visitation increased rapidly.

== Collection ==
The collection of the Lenox Library (around 85,000 books) was impressive by any standard – the collection of Bibles, in particular, was considered superior even to the libraries of Oxford, Cambridge, and the British Museum. Lenox was in possession of the Mazarin Bible, the first Gutenberg Bible to enter the New World. According to bibliographic legend, Henry Stevens instructed customs officials to remove their hats when they saw the bible, as it was such a great treasure that is deserved reverence. Lenox also focused on Milton, Shakespeare, and Americana. His library was "patchy" to a librarian seeking to have a broad array of resources, but incredibly valuable to a bibliophile like himself who developed passions about specific fields. The library was described by Wilberforce Eames as lacking "books on almost every subject besides the few subjects on which Mr. Lenox collected."

The library held 83,331 books in 1894, composed chiefly of books from James Lenox (~30,000 books), Evert Augustus Duyckinck (15,000 books), Felix Astoin (4,500 books), Joseph William Drexel (5–6,000 books), Robert Lenox Kennedy (5,000), Robert L. Stuart (12,000 books), George Bancroft (15,000 books, purchased in 1893 for $84,492), Wendell Prime (450 books), and 45,000 newspapers purchased in 1894 (composed of 21,000 from Thomas Addis Emmet (son of John Patten Emmet, 14,000 from the Historical Society of Pennsylvania, and the rest from smaller acquisitions).

Lenox's art collection was also remarkable, and included what are believed to be the first J. M. W. Turner paintings to cross the Atlantic. It also included works by Thomas Gainsborough, Albert Bierstadt, Gilbert Stuart, Thomas Cole, and Sir Joshua Reynolds, among others. There were 145 paintings on display, 15 sculptures, and 59 items classified as "paintings on porcelain, enamels, mosaics, etc."

The Digital Recreation of the Lenox Library Picture Gallery, an interactive, 3D recreation of Lenox's art collection as it hung in the Lenox Library in the late 19th century, provides a deeper view of the collection, a glimpse into the mind of James Lenox as an art collector, and a peek into late Victorian interior design strategies. This digital humanities project by Sally Webster and David Schwittek provides researchers with "varied functionalities: links that connect the paintings to the accompanying text, the ability to see the gallery from different angles, pre-programmed arrangements of paintings that illustrate juxtapositions stated in the text, and an information (or text) panel for each painting accessible by clicking on each individual painting. Included in a given text panel is the title of the painting, the name of the artist, and other tombstone information, as well as short explanatory content."

== Visitation ==
In 1894, 26,156 people visited the library. The library's resources were limited to scholars who had to apply for admission. Likewise, visitors to the gallery were only welcome two days per week with advance tickets they requested via mail. Eames wrote that "The intention of the founder was to establish a museum of book rarities which would supplement, and not duplicate the collections in other libraries."

Every librarian knows that the Lenox Museum as it should have been called, was not intended to be a free circulating library for the benefit of the poor of New York, nor even a library of reference for the literary man anxious to throw off a magazine article or a leader in some newspaper in the quickest possible time. The latter we are now told, is the function of the Astor. The Lenox has not the books to perform these offices, it has not the money to pay the attendants that a public library in a great city needs, and its situation is entirely unfit for any such purpose, and its books are still more unfit... One might as well complain that the Zoological Museum does not give up its stuffed birds to furnish Christmas dinners to the poor.

— Charles Ammi Cutter

== Legacy ==
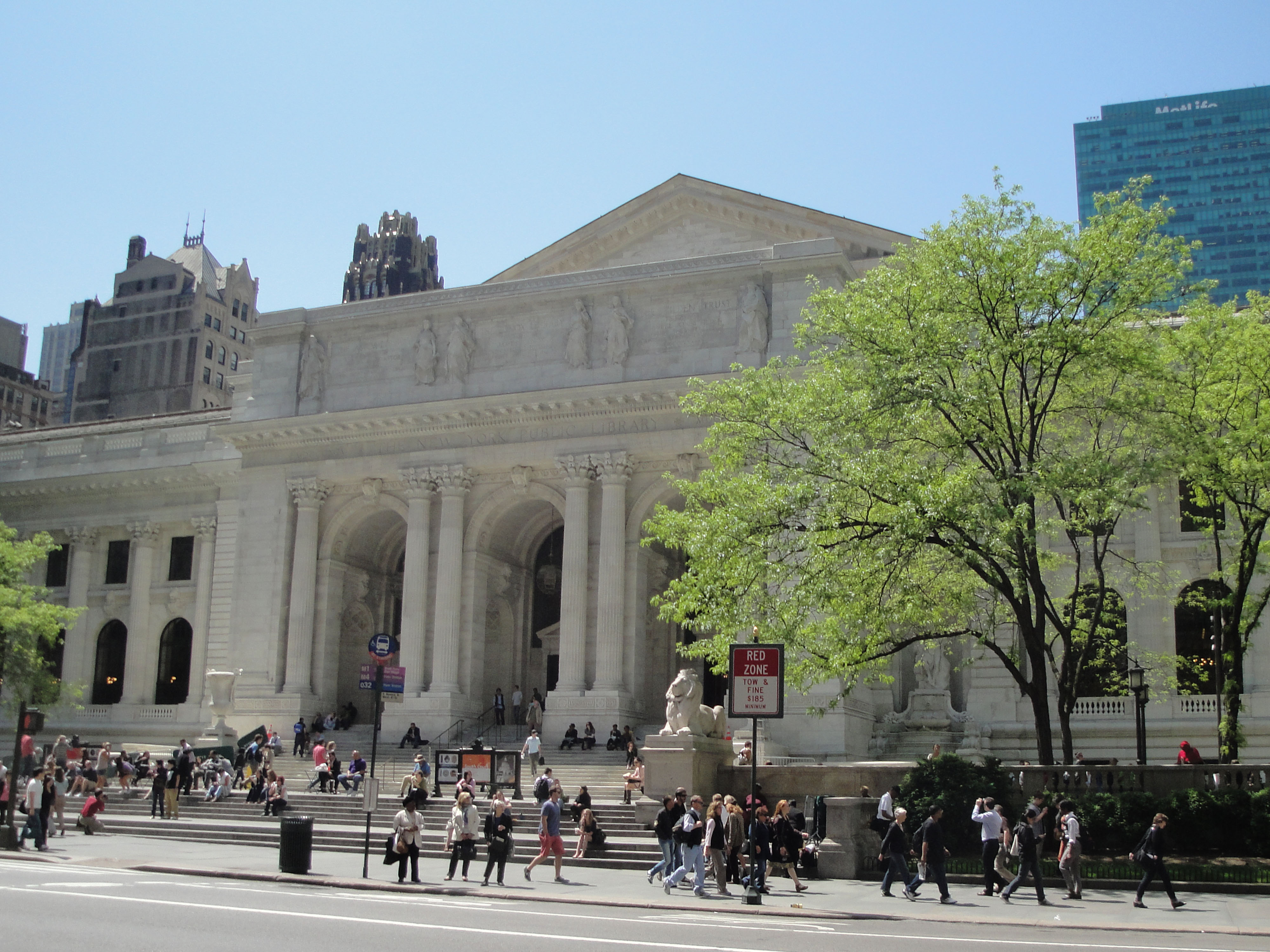
Façade of the New York Public Library Main Branch building, which replaced the Lenox Library

After James Lenox's death in 1880, his library's finances began to suffer. In 1895, the Samuel Tilden Trust provided the funds for the creation of a public library in New York, and was the catalyst for the consolidation of the Lenox Library and the Astor Library into the New York Public Library. John Bigelow, along with other allies, assumed control of the project until the parties signed the agreements on May 23, 1895. The first director was Dr. John Shaw Billings, and he oversaw the construction of the Fifth Avenue building that still stands. It opened to the public in 1911.

The Lenox Library was demolished in 1912 after all books were transferred to the new New York Public Library Main Branch. At this time, there was an unsuccessful proposal to transfer the Lenox Library's collection to the sheepfold at Sheep Meadow in nearby Central Park. Henry Clay Frick, who had purchased the land on which the library stood in 1906, immediately began building his own home and future museum, which was completed in 1914 and opened to the public as the Frick Collection in 1935.

The name James Lenox is still inscribed on the façade of the New York Public Library, in the center over the middle door, along with the names John Jacob Astor and Samuel Jones Tilden. The legacy of James Lenox lives on today in that institution, as do many of the treasures of his collection.

The portrait of George Washington by Gilbert Stuart that was in Lenox's collection, and then the New York Public Library, was put up for sale at auction at Sotheby's in 2005, as part of a campaign to raise money for the library's endowment. It failed to sell, likely due to its size (95×64in) and the fact that another Stuart Washington portrait was also for sale in the same auction. It has since sold to New York collectors Judy and Michael Steinhardt for an undisclosed amount, but for no less than $5 million.

== Highlights from the collection ==
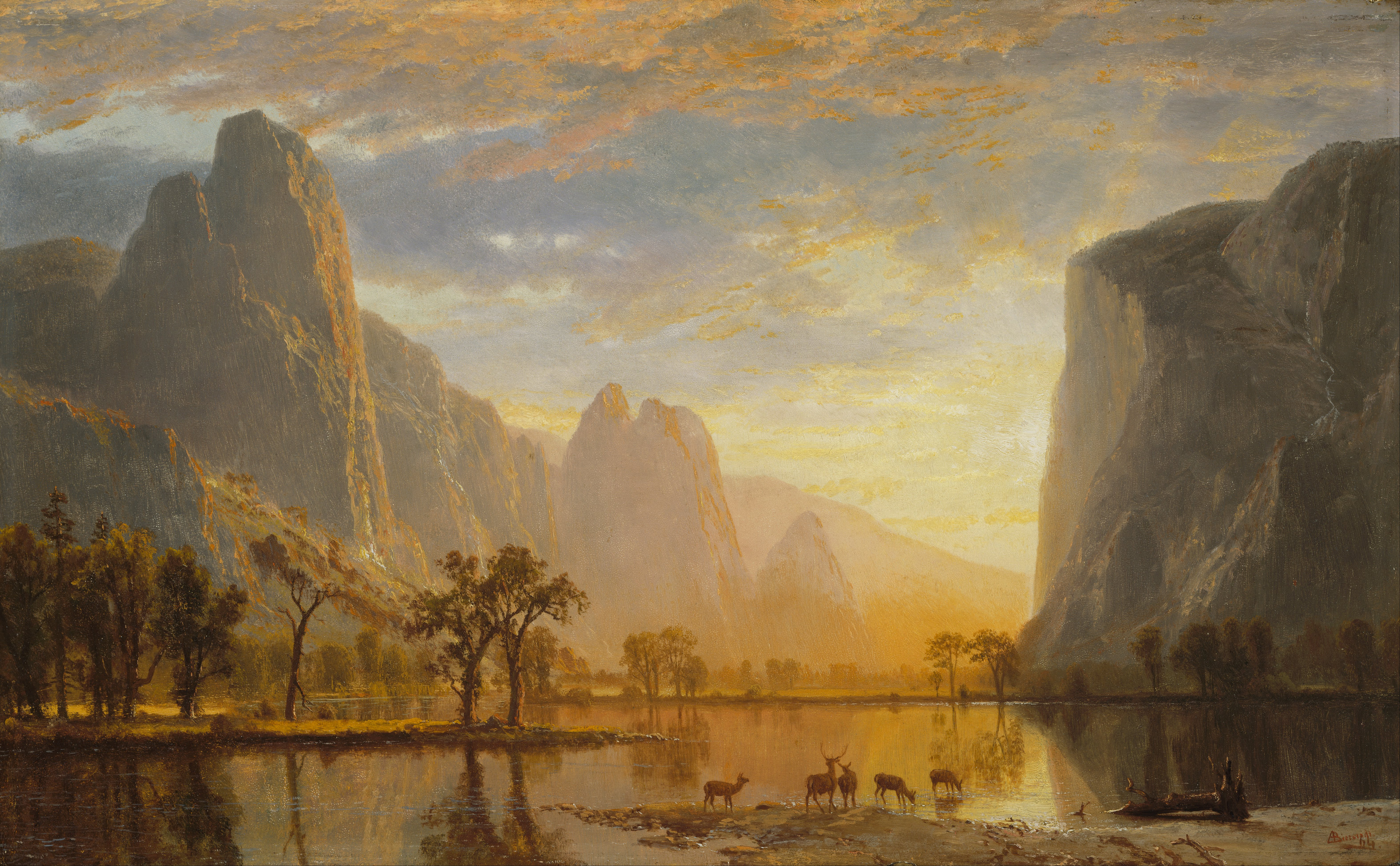
Albert Bierstadt, Valley of the Yosemite, 1864. Museum of Fine Arts, Boston

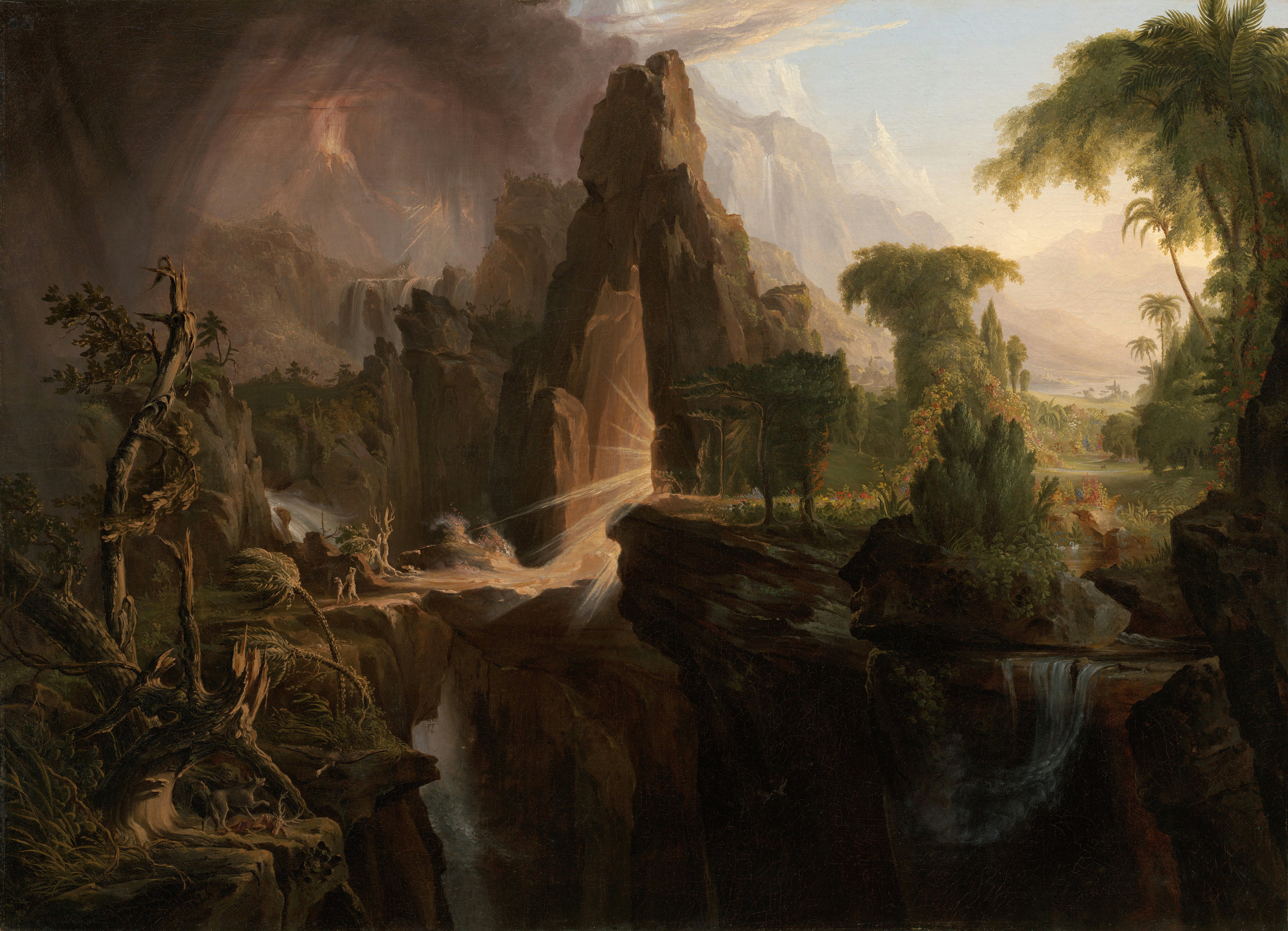
Thomas Cole, Expulsion from the Garden of Eden (Cole), 1828. Museum of Fine Arts, Boston

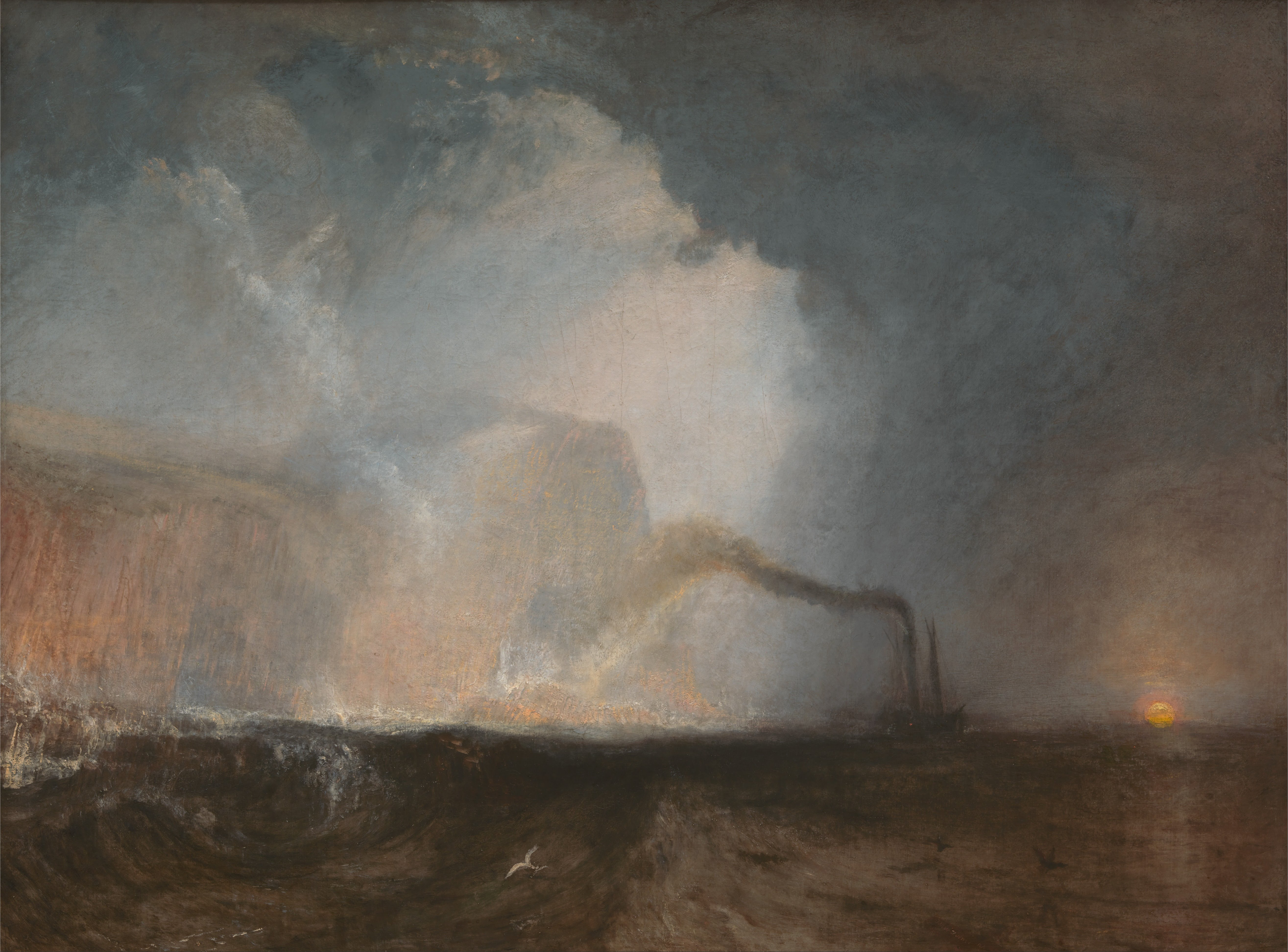
J. M. W. Turner, Staffa, Fingal's Cave, 1831-32. Yale Center for British Art

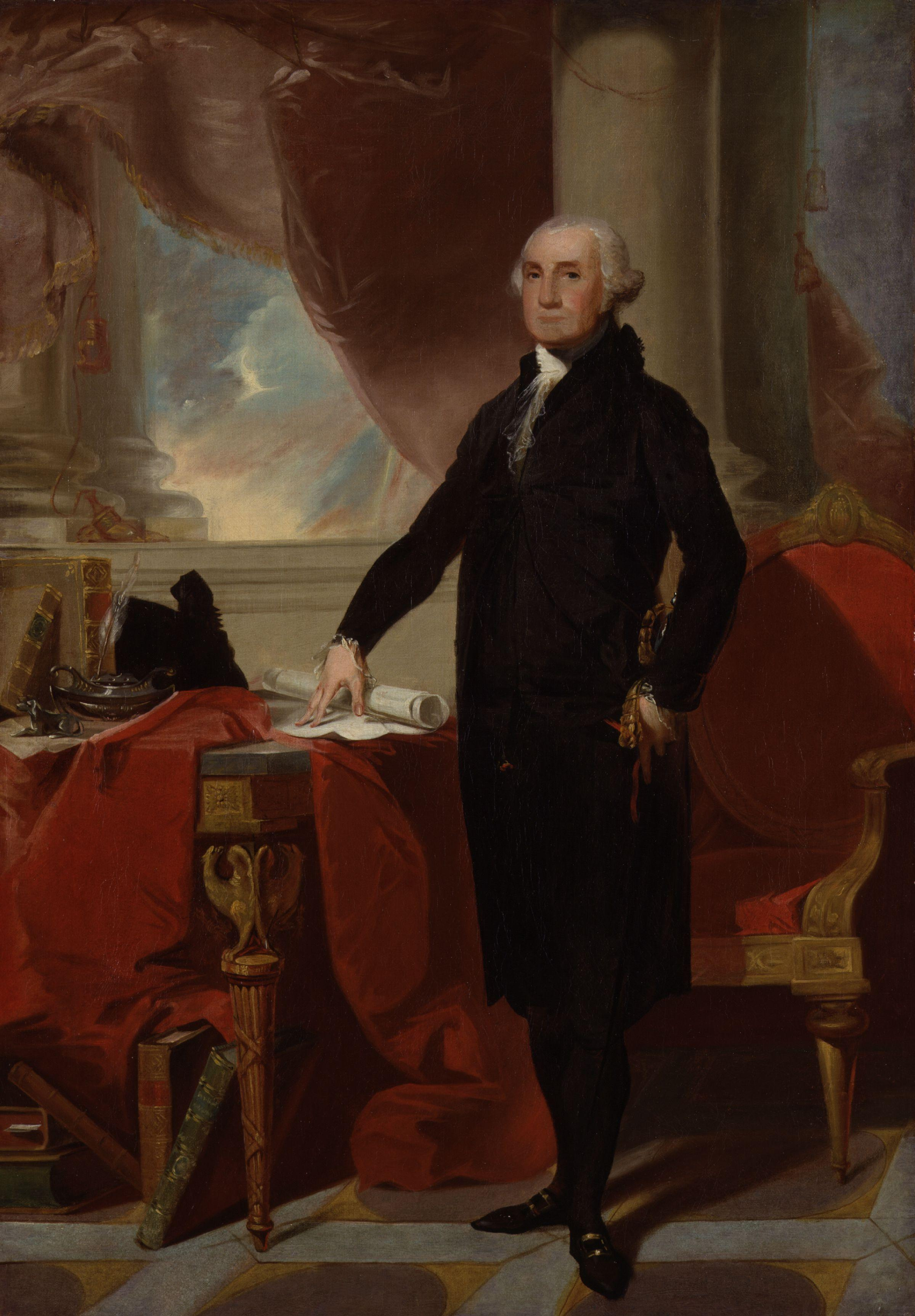
Gilbert Stuart, George Washington (The Munro-Lenox Portrait), circa 1800. Private collection.
