= Robert Lenox =

Scottish-American merchant

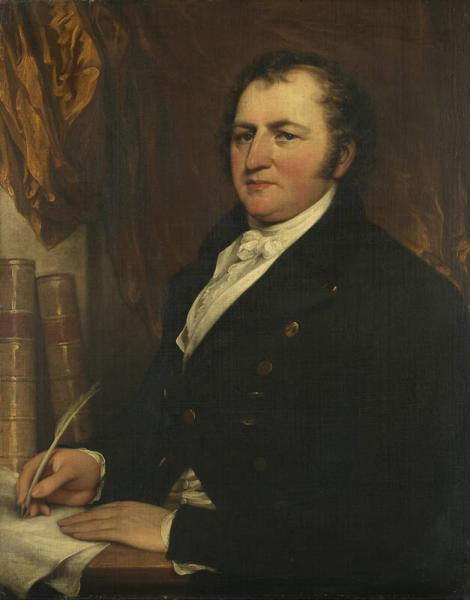

15th President of the Saint Andrew's Society of the State of New York
- In office 1798–1814
- Preceded by: Walter Rutherfurd
- Succeeded by: James Tillary

Personal details
- Born: December 31, 1759 Kirkcudbright, Scotland
- Died: December 13, 1839 (aged 79) New York City, U.S.
- Spouse: Rachel Carmer (m. 1783)
- Children: 12, including James Lenox

Robert Lenox (December 31, 1759 – December 13, 1839) was a Scottish-American merchant who served as the 15th president of the Saint Andrew's Society of the State of New York.

== Early life ==
Lenox was born on December 31, 1759, in the seaport town of Kirkcudbright on the southwest border of Scotland. He was one of eleven children born to James Lenox and Elizabeth (née Sproat) Lenox.

His paternal grandfather was William Lennox and his maternal grandfather was David Sproat, both from the parish of Kirkcudbright in Scotland.

== Career ==
Just before the Revolutionary War, he emigrated to America with his brothers David and William. They first went to their uncle, David Sproat, a merchant in Philadelphia, who had come to America in 1760. His uncle joined the British Army at New York, and was appointed Commissary-General of Naval Prisoners in North America in the Autumn of 1779. His brother William was appointed British Commissary of Naval Prisoners in the South, based in Charleston, where he died in 1781. After schooling in Burlington, New Jersey, Robert joined his uncle and brother William in New York in 1779, dividing his time between working as a clerk in the British Commissary of Naval Prisoners, and pursuing his own concerns as a merchant, travelling between New York, Charleston, and the West Indies.

His other brother David joined the Continental Army and was a major by the end of the war. After the War, David became a merchant in Philadelphia, where he died in 1828.

Shortly after the end of the War, Robert was joined by James Lenox, his youngest brother who came from Scotland, and established the merchant house of Jas. Lenox & Wm. Maitland in 1796. James retired from the firm in 1818 and returned to Scotland, where he died in 1839. The firm later became known as Kennedy & Maitland, Maitland, Phelps & Co., and later Maitland, Coppell & Co.

By 1795 Lenox life had become a member of the New York City Board of Aldermen, served as a magistrate judge, and was a director of the New York branch of the First Bank of the United States. As of 1820 he was also a trustee of Princeton University.

== Personal life ==
On September 1, 1783, Lenox was married to Rachel Carmer. Rachel was the daughter of Nicholas Carmer, a New York cabinet maker. Together, they were the parents of twelve children, but only six, five girls and one boy, lived to maturity:

- Elizabeth Sproat Lenox (1785–1864), who married Robert Maitland.
- Isabella Henderson Lenox (1789–1866), who married William Banks.
- David Sproat Lenox (1790–1792), who died in infancy.
- Rachel Carmer Lenox (1792–1875), who married her cousin, David Sproat Kennedy (1791–1853).
- Charlotte Murdoch Lenox (1794–1807), who died in childhood.
- Alethea Carmer Lenox (1797–1806), who died in childhood.
- Robert Lenox (1797–1798), who died in infancy.
- Jennet Lenox (1798–1870).
- James Lenox (1800–1880), a philanthropist.
- Mary Lenox (1803–1886), who married John Fisher Sheafe.
- Henrietta Anderson Lenox (1804–1886).
- Alethea Lenox (1807–1878), who married James Donaldson, brother of banker Robert Donaldson Jr.

Lenox died at his residence, 59 Broadway in New York City on December 13, 1839. Upon his death, he left a fortune of over one million dollars and 30 acres of land between Fourth and Fifth Avenues to his only son, who by 1855 was the third richest man in New York.

== External sources ==
- "Lenox family papers". archives.nypl.org. New York Public Library.
