= Frederick Sturges =

Frederick Sturges (June 1, 1833 – December 22, 1917) was an American businessman, philanthropist and art connoisseur who was, briefly, a brother-in-law of J.P. Morgan.

== Early life ==
Sturges was born in Fairfield, Connecticut on June 1, 1833. He was the eldest son of Mary Pemberton (née Cady) Sturges (1806–1894) and Jonathan Sturges. He grew up in New York City and at his parents' Gothic Revival summer house (today known as the Jonathan Sturges House) on Mill Plain Road in Fairfield. His elder sister Virginia was married to railroad executive William H. Osborn. His younger siblings were Amelia Sturges (the first wife of J. P. Morgan), Arthur Pemberton Sturges (who studied at Princeton Theological Seminary, but died before graduating), and historian Henry Cady Sturges.

His paternal grandparents were Barnabas Lothrop Sturges and Mary (née Sturges) Sturges. His great-uncle, Lewis Burr Sturges, and great-grandfather, Jonathan Sturges, were both U.S. Representatives from Connecticut. His maternal grandparents were Ebenezer Pemberton Cady (a grandson of Ebenezer Pemberton) and Elizabeth Smith Cady.

== Career ==
Sturges maintained the books for the 1,000 family farm in Fairfield, Connecticut, including "daily notations on the weather and the amount of labor expended, accounts with Sturges, and an inventory of 'his place.' He also served as a director of the National Bank of Commerce in New York (alongside J. Pierpont Morgan, James N. Jarvie, Augustus D. Juilliard, John Stewart Kennedy, Charles D. Lanier, and Charles H. Russell), of which his father was a founder and one of the original stockholders and directors in 1839, among John Austin Stevens, Peter Gerard Stuyvesant, Samuel Ward, and Stephen Whitney.

A prominent philanthropist, he was a charter member of the Century Association, a trustee of the New York Public Library, and was especially active in the affairs of the Presbyterian Hospital where he founded the Florence Nightingale School for Trained Nurses.

== Personal life ==
On July 29, 1863, Sturges was married to Mary Reed Fuller (1834–1886) in Hyde Park, New York by Rev. Thomas House Taylor. Mary was the eldest daughter of Dudley B. Fuller of the Fuller Brothers & Co., manufacturers of nails, nuts, bolts, iron washers and sheet iron. Together, they were the parents of three surviving children, two sons and a daughter:

- Jonathan Sturges (1864–1911), a writer who was born in Paris and died in Eastbourne, England.
- Mary Fuller Sturges (1870–1962), who married the Rev. Dr. Andrew Chalmers Wilson (1872–1952), president of the Redwood Athenaeum in Newport, Rhode Island.
- Frederick Sturges Jr. (1874–1977), who married Mary Armit Hall (1877–1969), a daughter of Forbes Hall.

He was a member of the Union League Club, the Century Club, the Downtown Club and the Grolier Club.

His wife died in Morristown, New Jersey on February 17, 1886. Sturges died on December 22, 1917 at his home, 36 Park Avenue in Manhattan.

=== Art collection ===
A prominent art connoisseur, Sturges owned a number of significant art pieces including The Bashful Cousin (c. 1841-1842) by Francis William Edmonds, Forest in the Morning Light (c. 1855) and A Pastoral Scene (1858), both by Asher Brown Durand, Beacon Rock, Newport Harbor (1857) by John Frederick Kensett, View on Lake George (1857) by John William Casilear and Beach at Beverly (c. 1869/1872) by John Frederick Kensett. His son, Frederick Sturges Jr., bequeathed several of Sturges family paintings to the National Gallery of Art upon his death in 1977.

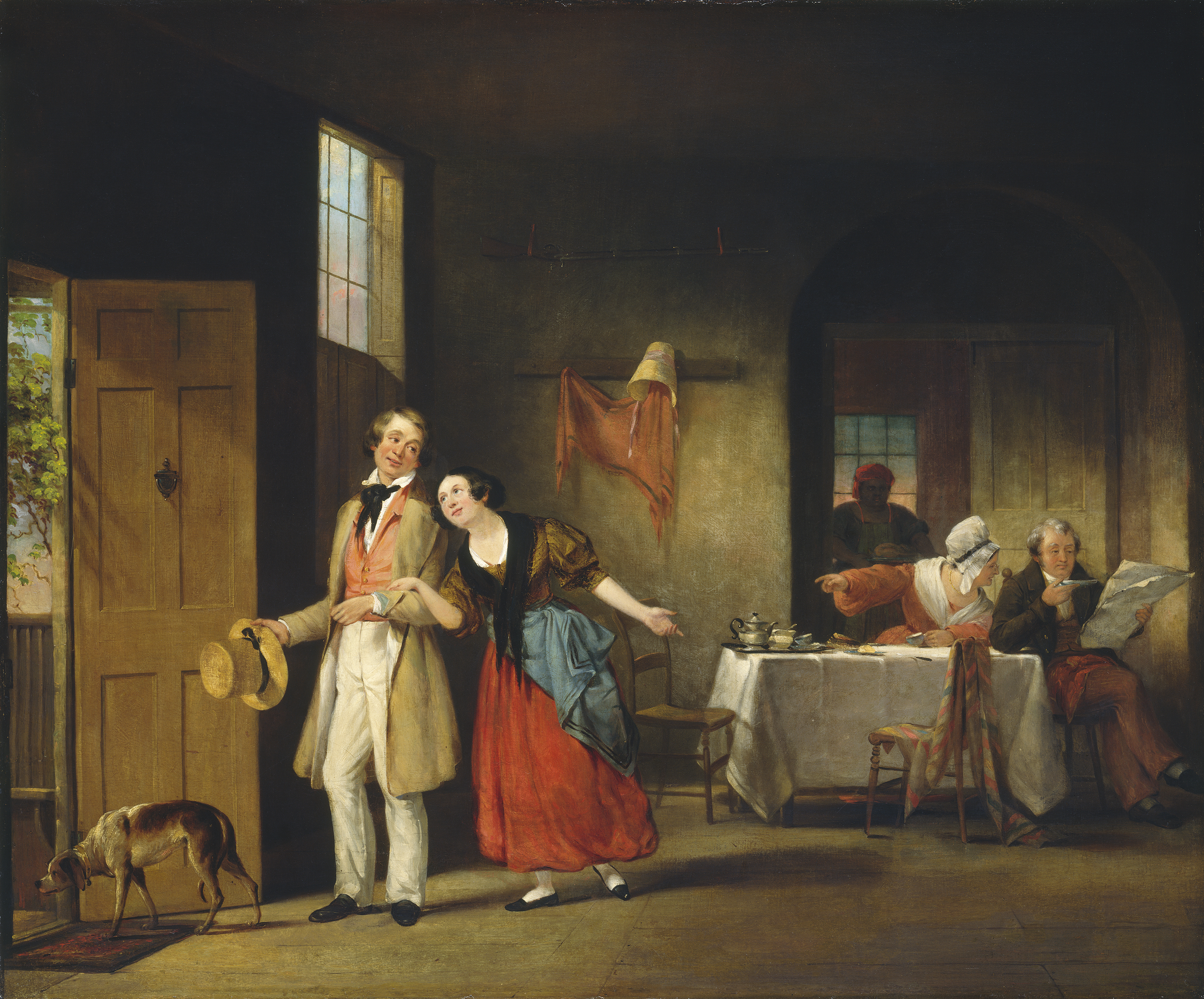
The Bashful Cousin (c. 1841-1842) by Francis William Edmonds

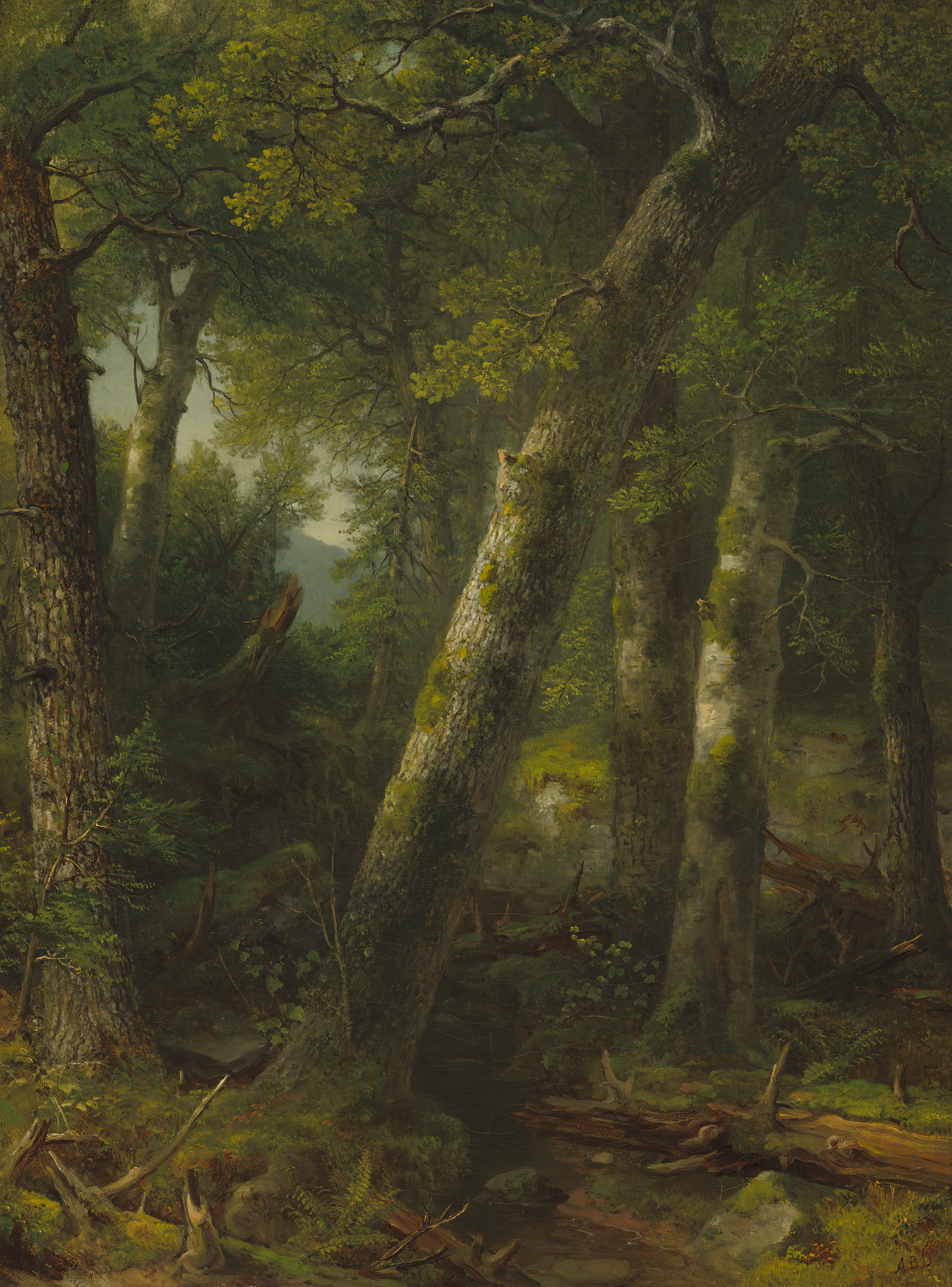
Forest in the Morning Light (c. 1855) by Asher Brown Durand

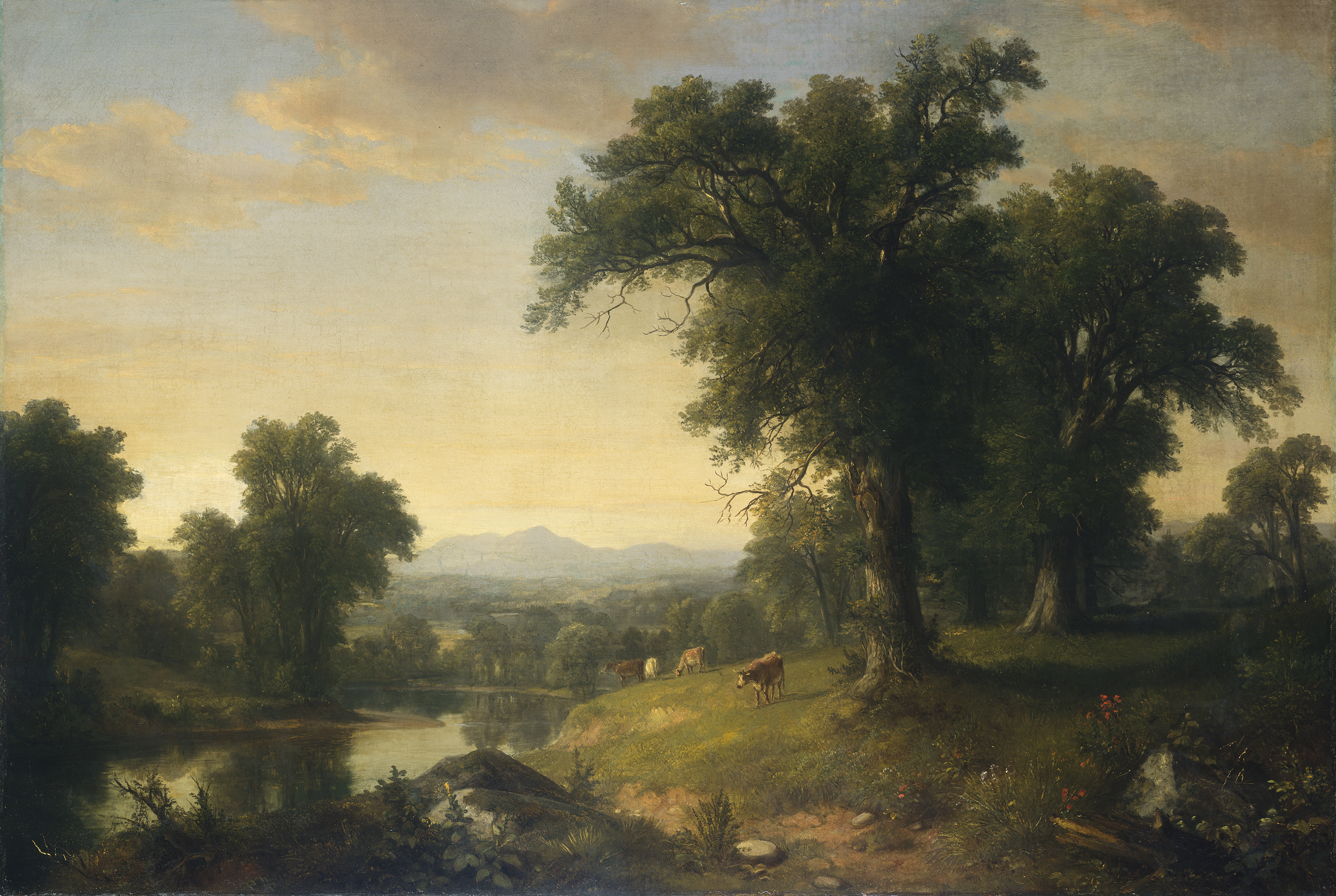
A Pastoral Scene (1858) by Asher Brown Durand

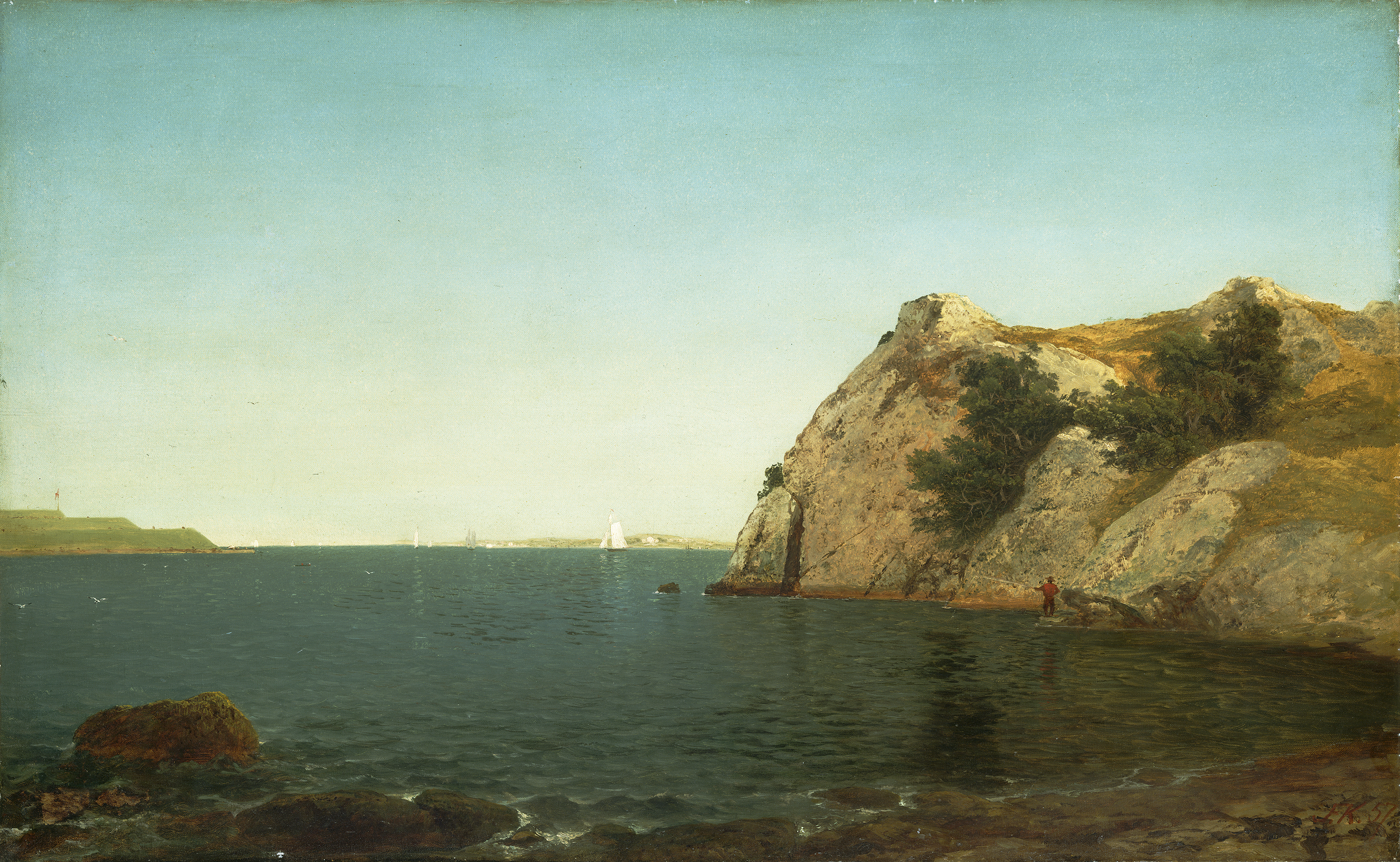
Beacon Rock, Newport Harbor (1857) by John Frederick Kensett

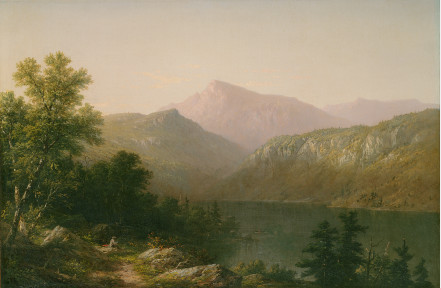
View on Lake George (1857) by John William Casilear

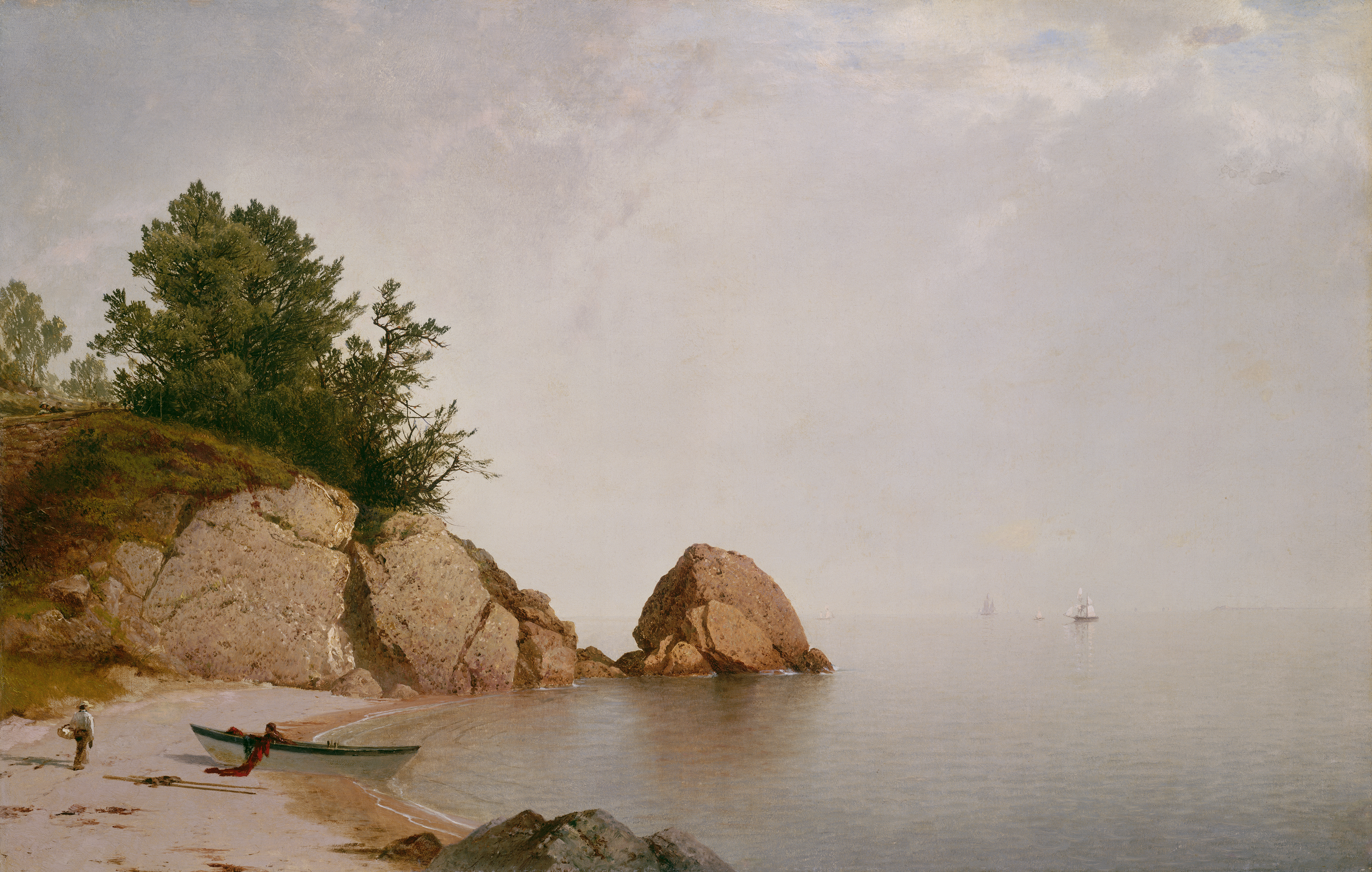
Beach at Beverly (c. 1869/1872) by John Frederick Kensett
