= James Alexander =

James or Jim Alexander may refer to:

== Arts and entertainment ==
- J. W. Alexander (musician) (James Woodie Alexander II, 1916–1996), American singer, songwriter and record producer
- James R. Alexander (1930–2019), American sound engineer
- Jim Alexander (photographer) (born 1935), American documentary photographer
- James Alexander (musician) (born 1949), American bassist

== Law and politics ==
- James Alexander (lawyer) (1691–1756), American lawyer and politician of the colonial period
- James Alexander, 1st Earl of Caledon (1730–1802), Irish landlord, merchant, politician and peer of the realm
- James Alexander (British politician, born 1769), British banker, and MP for Old Sarum
- James Alexander Jr. (1789–1846), U.S. Congressman from Ohio
- James Alexander, 3rd Earl of Caledon (1812–1855), British soldier and politician
- James M. Alexander (1815–1871), African-American businessperson and politician in Arkansas
- James Peterkin Alexander (1835–1912), Scottish-born politician in Manitoba, Canada
- James Alexander, 4th Earl of Caledon (1846–1898), British soldier and politician
- James P. Alexander (1883–1948), American jurist, Justice of the Supreme Court of Texas
- James Alexander Anderson (died 1930), Canadian politician

== Others ==
- James Edward Alexander (1803–1885), British soldier and traveller
- James Waddel Alexander (1804–1859), American Presbyterian minister and author
- James S. Alexander (1865–1932), American banker
- James Thomas Alexander (1888–1952), US Navy captain
- James Waddell Alexander II (1888–1971), American mathematician & topologist
- Jim Alexander (footballer) (1899–1972), Australian rules footballer
- James Alexander (cricketer) (1916–1943), English cricketer
- James Tavian Alexander (born c. 1959), a.k.a. James Alexander McQuirter, Grand Wizard of the Canadian Knights of the Ku Klux Klan
