= Pelatiah Perit =

President of the Chamber of Commerce of the State of New York
- In office 1853–1863
- Preceded by: Elias Hicks
- Succeeded by: Abiel Abbot Low

Personal details
- Born: Pelatiah Webster Perit; June 23, 1785 Norwich, Connecticut
- Died: March 8, 1864 (aged 78) New Haven, Connecticut
- Spouse(s): Jerusha Lathrop; Maria Coit
- Relations: Pelatiah Webster (grandfather)
- Education: Yale University

Pelatiah Webster Perit (June 23, 1785 – March 8, 1864) was a New York merchant and banker.

== Early life ==
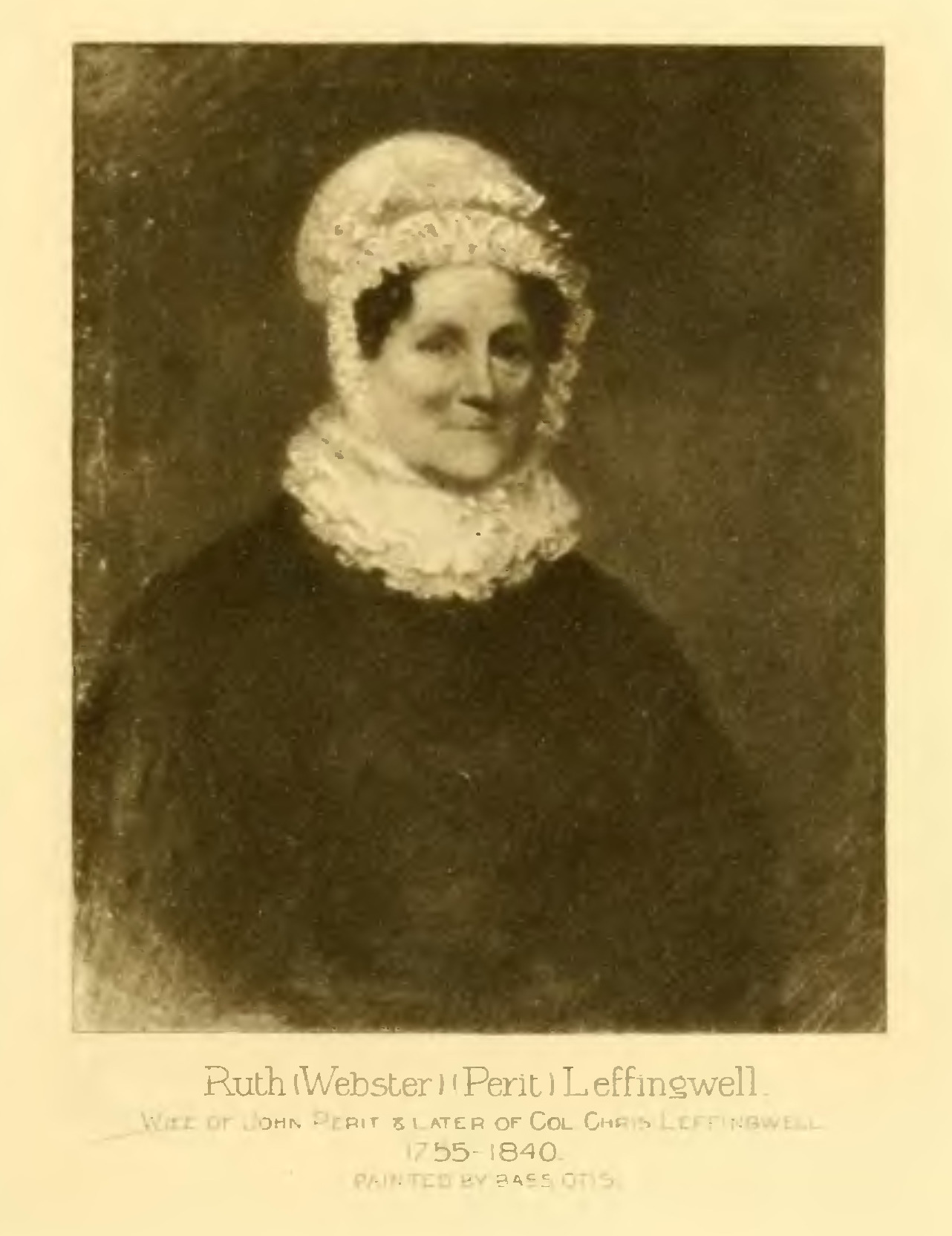
Perit's mother, Ruth Webster Perit Leffingwell.

Perit was born on June 23, 1785, in Norwich, Connecticut and named after his maternal grandfather, Pelatiah Webster. He was the son of Capt. John Perit and Ruth Kellogg (née Webster) Perit. Among his siblings were John Webster Perit (married to Margaretta Dunlap), Maria Perit (wife of Charles Phelps Huntington), and Rebecca Hunt Perit (wife of Joshua Hubbard Lathrop). After his father died in 1795, his mother married Christopher Leffingwell in 1799. He graduated from Yale College with the class of 1802.

== Career ==
He served as president of the Chamber of Commerce of the State of New York from 1853 to 1863, and was a commissioner of police in 1857. He served as president of the Seamen's Savings Bank, and was an original incorporator and director of the Bank of Commerce in New York.

== Personal life ==
Perit was twice married. His first marriage was to Jerusha Lathrop, the sister of his brother-in-law, on September 6, 1809. After her death, he married Maria Coit (1793–1885) on October 8, 1823. Maria was a daughter of Daniel Lathrop Coit. In 1860, Perit had architect Sidney Mason Stone design him a Renaissance Revival style Italian villa in New Haven.

Perit died at his residence in New Haven, Connecticut in March 1864.
