= National Bank of Commerce in New York =

American bank (1839–1929)

- Formerly: Bank of Commerce in New York
- Industry: Banking
- Founded: 1839; 186 years ago
- Founders: Isaac Carow; Pelatiah Perit; Charles Handy Russell; Jonathan Sturges; Samuel Ward; Stephen Whitney
- Defunct: 1929; 96 years ago
- Fate: Merged into Guaranty Trust Company of New York
- Successor: Morgan Guaranty Trust Company; J.P. Morgan & Co. JPMorgan Chase
- Headquarters: Manhattan, New York, United States
- Key people: Robert Lenox Kennedy; Joseph C. Hendrix; John Austin Stevens

The National Bank of Commerce in New York was a national bank headquartered in New York City that merged into the Guaranty Trust Company of New York (which later became the Morgan Guaranty Trust Company, predecessor to J.P. Morgan & Co.).

== History ==
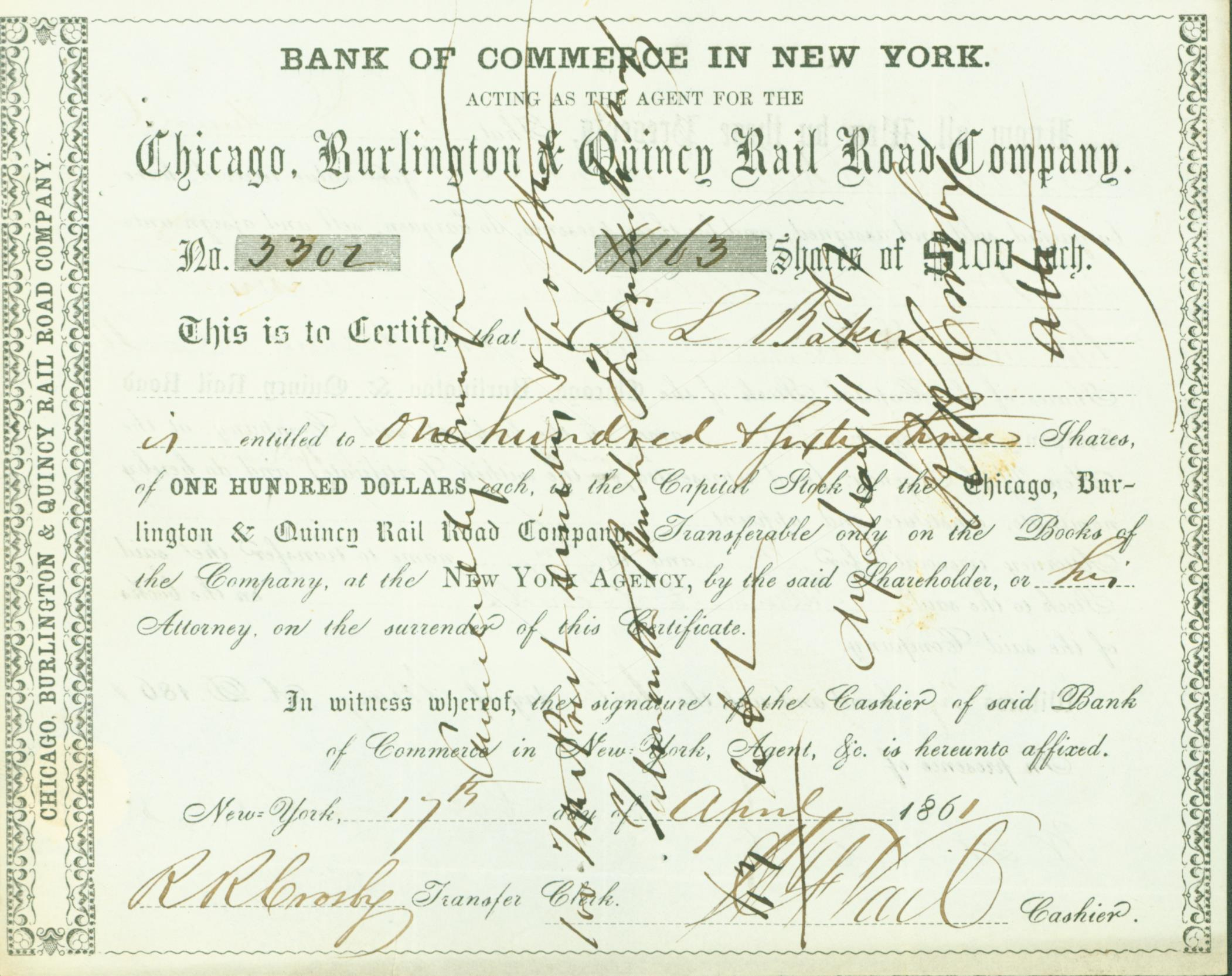
1861 was the Bank of Commerce in New York the agent for the Chicago, Burlington and Quincy Railroad Company.

On January 1, 1839, the articles of association established the Bank of Commerce. Before it opened to receive deposits on April 3, 1839, in the basement of the Merchants' Exchange, it had already subscribed $500,000 of its capital to a New York State loan for widening and deepening the Erie Canal. The original authorized capital of the bank was $5,000,000, of which $1,505,000 was taken up by the founders with the remainder publicly offered. The first president of the bank was Samuel Ward of Prime, Ward & King.

The first annual meeting was in May 1839 and was held by 565 stockholders. The original directors of the bank were: James Brown, Isaac Carow, James Donaldson, Archibald Gracie, James Kent, Robert B. Minturn, Russell H. Nevins, Pelatiah Perit, John Rathbone Jr., Robert Ray, Samuel B. Ruggles, Charles H. Russell, John Austin Stevens, Jonathan Sturges, Peter Gerard Stuyvesant, Samuel Ward, and Stephen Whitney. After Ward's death on November 27, 1839, John Austin Stevens took over as president of the bank.

At the time of the National Banking Acts of 1863 and 1864, the Bank of Commerce was the largest bank in the country. Charles Handy Russell, a dry goods merchant with Charles H. Russell & Co., succeeded Stevens as president in 1865 when the bank was converted to the National Bank of Commerce of New York. In 1859, Robert Lenox Kennedy was elected a director and, in 1868, he began serving as the bank's fourth president. He retired from the presidency in 1878 but remained involved as vice-president of the Bank under his successor Henry F. Vail (who had previously founded the Bank of the Republic with Gazaway Bugg Lamar).

=== Merger with National Union Bank ===
In 1900, the bank acquired the National Union Bank of New York which had been founded in 1893 by the directors of the New York Guaranty and Indemnity Company and its successor, the Guaranty Trust, and was associated with the Mutual Life Insurance Company (Mutual Life's president, Richard A. McCurdy, was a director of National Union). Joseph C. Hendrix, a former U.S. Representative from New York, was the president of National Union from its formation until its merger into the Bank of Commerce. Hendrix became president of the combined entity and J. Pierpont Morgan, the long-time vice president of the Bank of Commerce continued on as vice president of the combined entity. (Note: Before the merger, the Bank of Commerce directors were J. Pierpont Morgan, John Claflin, George G. Haven, Joseph C. Hendrix, James N. Jarvie, Augustus D. Juilliard, John Stewart Kennedy, Woodbury Langdon, Charles D. Lanier, Alexander E. Orr, Charles H. Russell, and Frederick Sturges. The directors of the National Union Bank of New York were Samuel D. Babcock, John D. Crimmins, Frederic Cromwell, George G. Haven, R. Somers Hayes, Joseph C. Hendrix, Augustus D. Juilliard, Daniel S. Lamont, Richard A. McCurdy, F. P. Olcott, Henry H. Rogers, Hamilton McKown Twombly, and William C. Whitney.)

The combined entity had capital of $10,000,000, which was the capital of the Bank of Commerce in 1877 prior to its reduction to $5,000,000. The consolidation plan "also has the merit, it is said, of providing for the Bank of Commerce the President which it has been looking for since W. W. Sherman retired from the place last July because of ill-health. William C. Duvall, who was cashier under Mr. Sherman, has been acting as President since then. It was at one time reported that the post was offered to Secretary of the Treasury Gage."

=== Merger with Western National Bank ===
In October 1903, the bank acquired the Western National Bank of the United States which had been founded in 1887. The Western National Bank of the United States was itself the result of a merger in early 1903 of the larger Western National Bank of New York (which was closely associated with the Equitable Life Assurance Society) and the smaller National Bank of the United States in New York (which was closely associated with the Mutual Life Insurance Company and the Morton Trust Company). Western National's president, Valentine P. Snyder, was chosen as the head of the new institution with J. Pierpont Morgan, former Vice President of the National Bank of Commerce, as First Vice President of the new institution. The combined entity had $25,000,000 of capital, $10,000,000 of surplus, and net deposits estimated at $120,000,000.

"The interesting details of the physical transfer were taken up on Monday, the day when officially the merger was to have effect. They involved carrying some $16,000,000 of cash, of which $12,000,000 was in gold and $67,000,000 of securities in bags and boxes from the Western National Bank Building, on the northwest corner of Nassau and Pine Streets, to the building of the National Bank of Commerce, correspondingly situated at Nassau and Cedar Streets. It was a simple process, and one that attracted but little attention from the passing throngs."

In 1911, James S. Alexander, became president of the bank following the April 1, 1911 retirement of Snyder. At the same time, Paul Warburg was elected to succeed Jacob H. Schiff as a director of the bank. In 1923, Alexander became chairman of the board of directors, and Stevenson E. Ward became president.

=== Merger with Guaranty Trust ===
In 1929, the bank merged into the $2,000,000,000 Guaranty Trust Company of New York after a consolidation between the Guaranty Trust Company and the National Bank of Commerce of New York. The new entity, which was brought together through the efforts of Myron C. Taylor (chairman of the finance committee of U.S. Steel), became the largest bank in the country with Guaranty bringing the largest trust business in the country and Commerce bringing its large commercial banking business. Before the merger could be completed, the Bank of Commerce had to give up its national charter and become a state bank. The combined entity with capital of $184,000,000 became operating in May 1929. William C. Potter, president of the Guaranty Trust Co. became president of the combined institution. James S. Alexander, chairman of the board of the Bank of Commerce, became chairman of the board of the new company.

In 1959, Guaranty Trust merged with J.P. Morgan & Co. Although Guaranty Trust was nearly four times the size of Morgan, the Morgan executives took over management of the combined entity Morgan Guaranty Trust Company of New York. Ten years after the merger, Morgan Guaranty established a bank holding company called J.P. Morgan & Co. Incorporated, but continued to operate as Morgan Guaranty through the 1980s before beginning to migrate back to use of the J.P. Morgan brand. In 1988, the company once again began operating exclusively as J.P. Morgan & Co. The firm merged with Chase Manhattan Bank in 2001 to form JPMorgan Chase.
