= J. W. Alexander =

J. W. Alexander may refer to:

- J. W. Alexander (musician) (1916–1996), American gospel and soul singer, producer and entrepreneur
- James Waddel Alexander (1804–1859), American Presbyterian minister and author
- John White Alexander (1856–1915), American portrait painter and illustrator
- James Waddell Alexander II (1888–1971), American mathematician and topologist

== See also ==
- James Alexander (disambiguation)
- John Alexander (disambiguation)
