= Charles T. Dunwell =

American politician (1852–1908)

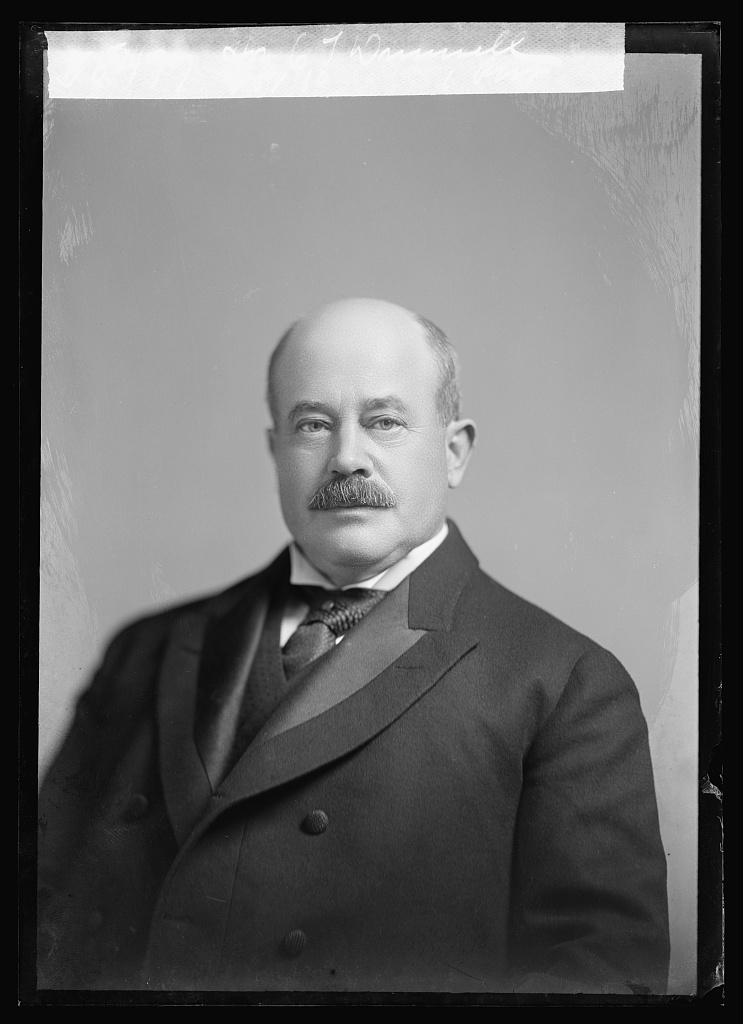
- Dunwell c. 1905

Member of the U.S. House of Representatives from New York's 3rd district
- In office March 4, 1903 – June 12, 1908
- Preceded by: Henry Bristow
- Succeeded by: Otto G. Foelker

Personal details
- Born: Charles Tappan Dunwell; February 13, 1852 Newark, New York, U.S.
- Died: June 12, 1908 (aged 56) New York City, U.S.
- Resting place: Evergreen Cemetery
- Party: Republican
- Relations: Pauline Dunwell Partridge (niece)
- Education: Cornell University; Columbia Law School
- Profession: Politician, lawyer

Charles Tappan Dunwell (February 13, 1852 – June 12, 1908) was a U.S. representative from New York.

Born in Newark, New York, Dunwell moved with his parents to nearby Lyons in 1854. He attended the Lyons Union School. He entered Cornell University, Ithaca, New York, in the class of 1873, where he was a member of Kappa Alpha Society. After the end of his junior year at Cornell, Dunwell entered Columbia Law School in the city of New York, and graduated in 1874.

He was admitted to the bar in 1874 and commenced practice in New York City. In 1889, he began serving as general agent for the New York Life Insurance Company. He was an unsuccessful candidate for comptroller of the city of Brooklyn in 1890. Dunwell served as a member of the New York Republican State committee in 1891–92.

Dunwell was elected as a Republican to the Fifty-eighth, Fifty-ninth, and Sixtieth Congresses and served from March 4, 1903, until his death in Brooklyn, New York, June 12, 1908. He was interred in Evergreen Cemetery.

== See also ==
- List of members of the United States Congress who died in office (1900–1949)

U.S. House of Representatives
Preceded by Henry Bristow	Member of the U.S. House of Representatives from New York's 3rd congressional district 1903–1908	Succeeded by Otto G. Foelker
