= Alfred Erskine Marling =

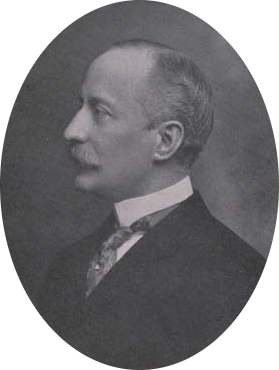
- Marling in 1914
- Born: October 5, 1858; Toronto, Canada West
- Died: May 29, 1935 (aged 76); Manhattan, New York City
- Occupation: Businessman
- Spouse: Harriet Winslow Philips (1846-1934) (m. 1884)
- Parent(s): Francis H. Marling; Merina C. MacDowell

Alfred Erskine Marling (October 5, 1858 – May 29, 1935) was a Canadian-born American businessman. He served as the president of Horace S. Ely & Co. and later president of the Chamber of Commerce of the State of New York.

== Early life ==
Alfred Erskine Marling was born on October 5, 1858, in Toronto, Canada West, to Reverend Francis Henry Marling and Marina Catherine MacDonald. Both parents were born in England. He had a brother, Charles Edward Marling (c1860-1937). He migrated to the United States on December 1, 1875. He married Harriet Winslow Philips (1846-1934) on January 10, 1884, in Manhattan, New York City. They had a child, Harold Erskin Marling (1886-1898).

== Career ==
Marling served as the president of Horace S. Ely & Co. and later president of the Chamber of Commerce of the State of New York.

Marling headed the Union League Club of New York, and was a director or trustee in 16 corporations, he made national news in 1919 by proposing a $5,000,000 (approximately $92,850,000 today) housing corporation to move 20,000 New Yorkers from tenements into modern low-cost apartments.

== Death ==
Marling died on May 29, 1935, in Manhattan, New York City. He was buried in Woodlawn Cemetery in Bronx, New York City.
