= Edmund H. Driggs =

American congressman (1865–1946)

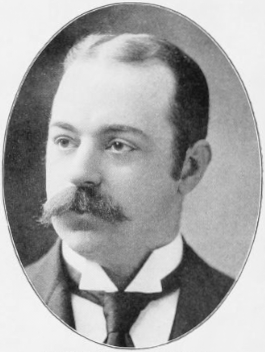

Member of the U.S. House of Representatives from New York's 3rd district
- In office December 6, 1897 – March 3, 1901
- Preceded by: Francis H. Wilson
- Succeeded by: Henry Bristow

Personal details
- Born: Edmund Hope Driggs; May 2, 1865 Brooklyn, New York, US
- Died: September 27, 1946 (aged 81) Brooklyn, New York, US
- Resting place: Cypress Hills Cemetery, Brooklyn, New York
- Party: Democratic

Edmund Hope Driggs (May 2, 1865 – September 27, 1946) was an American businessman and politician who served two terms as a United States representative from New York from 1897 to 1901.

== Biography ==
Born in Brooklyn, he attended the public schools and Adelphi Academy in Brooklyn. He became engaged in the casualty-insurance business.

=== Tenure in Congress ===
Driggs was elected as a Democrat to the Fifty-fifth Congress to fill the vacancy caused by the resignation of Francis H. Wilson; he was reelected to the Fifty-sixth Congress and served from December 6, 1897, to March 3, 1901.

=== Career after Congress ===
He was an unsuccessful candidate for reelection in 1900 to the Fifty-seventh Congress, and resumed the casualty-insurance business and also engaged in safety engineering.

=== Death and burial ===
He died in Brooklyn in 1946, and interred in Cypress Hills Cemetery within the same borough.

Following his retirement from public office, Driggs was honored with the renaming of 5th Street in Williamsburg as Driggs Avenue.

U.S. House of Representatives
Preceded by Francis H. Wilson	Member of the U.S. House of Representatives from New York's 3rd congressional district 1897–1901	Succeeded by Henry Bristow
