= The New Bonnet =

1858 painting by Francis William Edmonds

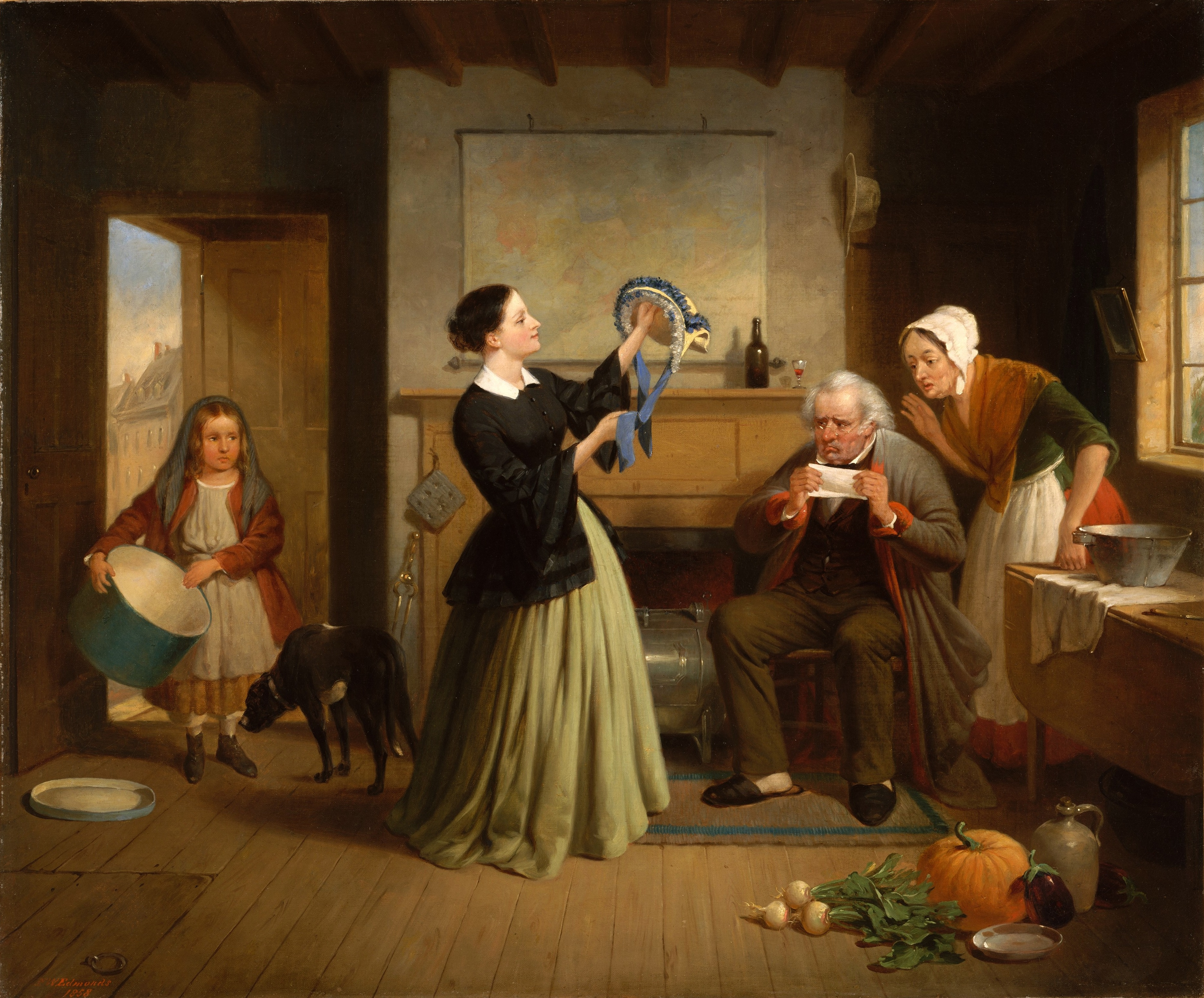
- Artist: Francis William Edmonds
- Year: 1858
- Medium: Oil on canvas
- Dimensions: 63.5 cm × 76.5 cm (25.0 in × 30.1 in)
- Location: Metropolitan Museum of Art; New York City
- Accession: 1975.27.1

The New Bonnet is a mid 19th-century painting by American artist Francis William Edmonds. Done in oil on canvas, the painting depicts a woman receiving a new bonnet. The work is on display in the Metropolitan Museum of Art.

== Description ==
Bonnet depicts a familial scene in which a woman opens a new bonnet. Edmonds included numerous specific details in his work to comment on contemporary American consumerism. For example, the family—a woman, her mother, and her father—is shown as middle class, shocked by the price of the bonnet but oblivious to the poverty of the lower-class girl (first from left) who delivered the garment. Additionally, the mother (first from right) is implied to be vain, as she holds a mirror, while the father (second from right) is suggested to be a drunk by the presence of a wine bottle and filled glass on the mantel behind him.

Edmonds may have modeled his painting on the works of the 17th-century Dutch masters.
