= Henry Bristow =

American politician

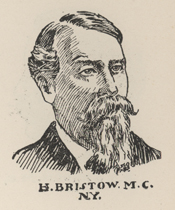

Member of the U.S. House of Representatives from New York's 3rd district
- In office March 4, 1901 – March 3, 1903
- Preceded by: Edmund H. Driggs
- Succeeded by: Charles T. Dunwell

Personal details
- Born: June 5, 1840 São Miguel Island, Azores
- Died: October 11, 1906 (aged 66) Brooklyn, New York, U.S.
- Party: Republican
- Occupation: businessman, administrator

Military service
- Allegiance: United States of America
- Branch/service: New York Militia
- Years of service: April 26, 1861 - June 3, 1861
- Unit: Company B, Seventh Regiment

Henry Bristow (June 5, 1840 – October 11, 1906) was a Portuguese-born Republican U.S. representative from New York.

== Life Before Politics ==
Born in São Miguel Island, Azores, Bristow immigrated to the United States with his parents, who settled in Brooklyn, New York. He attended public and private schools. He served as a private in Company B, Seventh Regiment, New York State Militia, from April 26, 1861, to June 3, 1861, and engaged in mercantile pursuits until 1896. He was appointed city magistrate in 1896. He served as a member of the board of education of Brooklyn from 1880 to 1889.

== Political career ==
Bristow was elected as a Republican to the Fifty-seventh Congress (March 4, 1901 – March 3, 1903). He was an unsuccessful candidate for reelection in 1902 to the Fifty-eighth Congress. He was appointed public administrator of Brooklyn, New York, in 1904 and served until his death in that city October 11, 1906. He was interred in Green-Wood Cemetery.

U.S. House of Representatives
Preceded by Edmund H. Driggs	Member of the U.S. House of Representatives from New York's 3rd congressional district 1901–1903	Succeeded by Charles T. Dunwell
