= Samuel D. Babcock =

American banker (1822-1902)

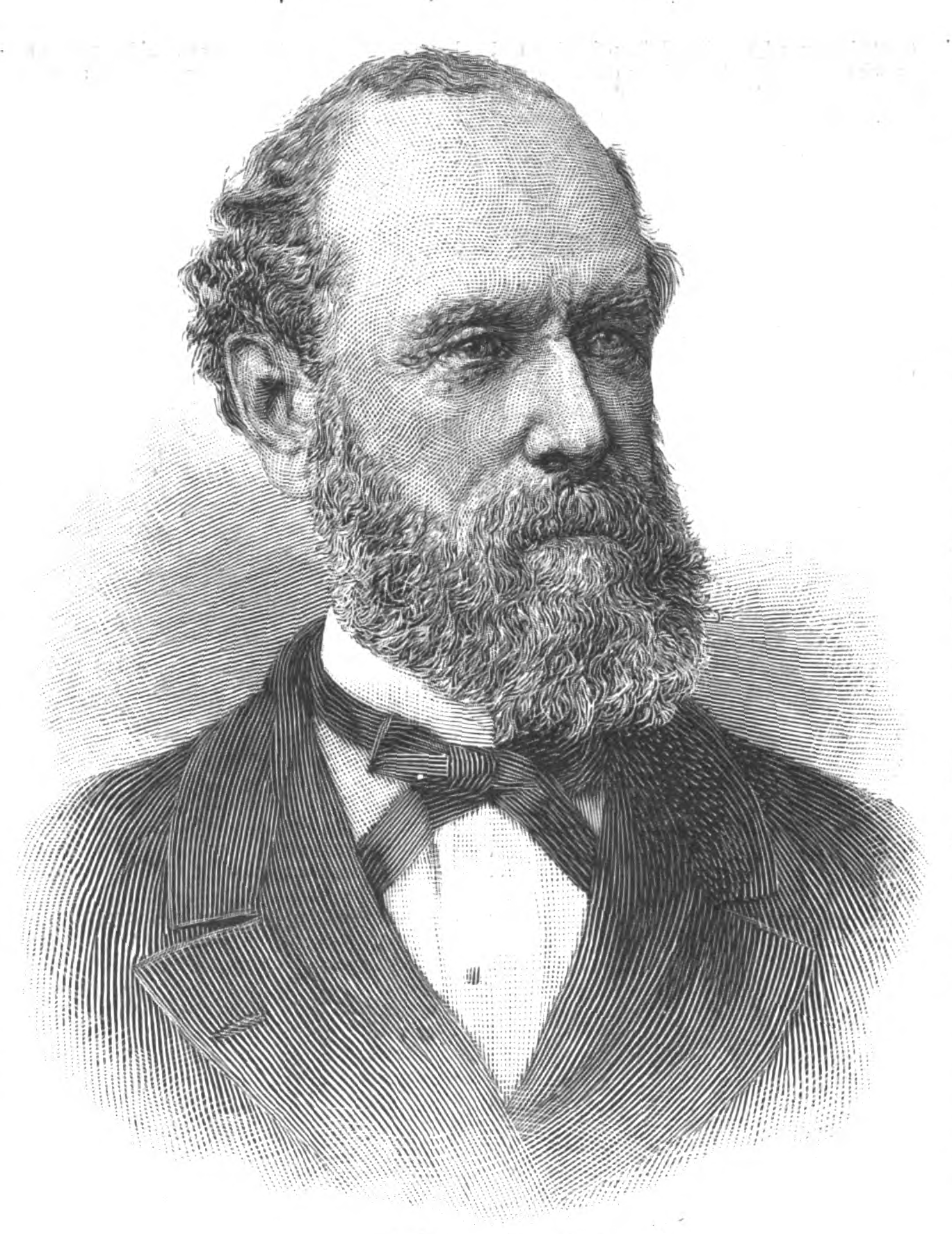

President of the Chamber of Commerce of the State of New York
- In office 1875–1882
- Preceded by: William E. Dodge
- Succeeded by: George W. Lane

Personal details
- Born: Samuel Denison Babcock; May 16, 1822 Stonington, Connecticut
- Died: September 14, 1902 (aged 80) Lenox, Massachusetts
- Spouse: Elizabeth Crary Franklin (m. 1846; died 1881)
- Relations: Henry Murray (grandson)
- Children: 8

Samuel Denison Babcock (May 16, 1822 – September 14, 1902) was an American banker.

== Early life ==
Babock was born on May 16, 1822, in Stonington, Connecticut. He was the son of Benjamin Franklin Babcock Sr. and Maria (née Eells) Babcock.

His ancestors were natives of Essex, among the staunchest of Puritan families, who went to Leiden, Holland, before landing at Plymouth Rock in 1623 with one of the first parties of colonists following the Mayflower. The family grew wealthy and rose to prominence, holding high civil and military positions during the American Revolutionary War.

== Career ==
At age fourteen, Babcock moved to New York City and began working as a bank messenger. He later served as president of the International Bell Telephone Company and of the Central, Manhattan, Colonial, and New York Real Estate Associations and the Chamber of Commerce of the State of New York; vice president of the Providence and Stonington Steamship Company and the City and Suburban Homes Association; treasurer of the Improved Dwellings Association; a director of the New York Central and Hudson River Railroad, the New York and Harlem Railroad Company, the National Bank of Commerce in New York, the American Exchange National Bank, the Continental Insurance Company, the Guarantee Trust Company, the Metropolitan Opera and Real Estate Company, the United States Mortgage and Trust Company; a trustee of the Central Trust Company, the Fifth Avenue Trust Company, and of the Mutual Life Insurance Company of New York. He was also a member of the Advisory Committee of the United States Lloyds.

His business partners in property development ventures included William W. Woodworth and Henry L. Atherton.

In 1889, he served as president of the Finance Committee for the proposed World's Fair in New York in 1892.

== Personal life ==
On December 2, 1846, Babcock married Elizabeth Crary Franklin (1828–1881), a daughter of Richard L. Franklin and Evelina (née Crary) Franklin. Elizabeth's younger sister, Cornelia Fulton Franklin, was married to Samuel's younger brother, Charles Henry Phelps Babcock. Together, they were the parents of:

- Henry Denison Babcock (1847–1918), who married Anna Mary Woodward (1849–1923), a daughter of Robert Thomas Woodward.
- Evelena Franklin Babcock (1849–1908), who married lawyer William Palmer Dixon (1847–1926) in 1871. (Note: William Palmer Dixon (1847–1926) was the son of Courtlandt Palmer Dixon (1817–1883) and Hannah Elizabeth (née Williams) Dixon (1817–1888). He was a cousin of U.S. Representative and Senator Nathan F. Dixon III, a nephew of Nathan F. Dixon II, and a grandson of U.S. Senator Nathan Fellows Dixon. William's sister, Priscilla Palmer Dixon (1851–1924), married Thomas C. Sloane and James Lent Barclay.)
- Emily Franklin Babcock (1855–1925), who married banker Fordyce Dwight Barker (1847–1893), a son of Benjamin Fordyce Barker.
- Elizabeth Babcock (b. 1857)
- Frances Morris "Fanny" Babcock (1858–1940), who married Henry Alexander Murray, a grandson of Lt.-Col. Hon. Alexander Murray (son of John Murray, 4th Earl of Dunmore, a governor of the Province of New York).
- Maria Babcock (b. 1860)
- Parthenia Babcock (1863–1865), who died young.
- Kate Spaulding Babcock (1868–1923), who died unmarried.

His New York City residence was at 636 Fifth Avenue, and he had a country residence, Hillside, in Riverdale-on-Hudson, New York.

His wife died at their Riverdale residence, Hillside, on May 28, 1881. Babcock died on September 14, 1902, at the Livingstone Cottage, his long-time summer home in Lenox, Massachusetts. He was buried at Green-Wood Cemetery in Brooklyn.

=== Descendants ===
Through his son Henry, he was a grandfather of Alice Woodward Babcock (1877–1941), who married banker Henry Rogers Winthrop Jr. (1876–1958), son of Buchanan Winthrop, in 1905.

Through his daughter Evelena, he was the grandfather of Evelena Babcock Dixon (1873–1935), who married Eben Stevens, an 1892 Yale graduate who was the son of banker Alexander Henry Stevens.

Through his daughter Fanny, he was a grandfather of Virginia Murray (1890–1980) (who married U.S. Representative Robert L. Bacon, son of Secretary of State Robert Bacon), Henry Murray (1893–1988), the Harvard psychologist who developed a theory of personality called personology, and Dr. Cecil Dunmore Murray (1897–1935).
