= Francis H. Wilson =

American politician

Francis Henry Wilson
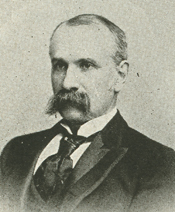

Member of the U.S. House of Representatives from New York's 3rd district
- In office March 4, 1895 – September 30, 1897
- Preceded by: Joseph C. Hendrix
- Succeeded by: Edmund H. Driggs

Personal details
- Born: February 11, 1844 Clinton, New York
- Died: September 25, 1910 (aged 66) Brooklyn, New York
- Party: Republican Party
- Education: Yale College; Columbia College Law School

Francis Henry Wilson (February 11, 1844 – September 25, 1910) was a U.S. representative from New York.

Born in Clinton, New York, Wilson lived in Utica, New York, until ten years of age, when he moved with his parents to the Westmoreland farm. He attended the district school, Dwight's Preparatory School, Clinton, New York, and was graduated from Yale College in 1867. He taught in a preparatory school four years. He was graduated from the Columbia College Law School, New York City, in 1875. He was admitted to the bar in 1882 and commenced practice in New York City. He was one of the founders of the Union League Club and its president in 1888 and 1889.

Wilson was elected as a Republican to the Fifty-fourth and Fifty-fifth Congresses and served from March 4, 1895, to September 30, 1897, when he resigned to become postmaster. He was appointed postmaster of Brooklyn, New York, and served from October 1897 until December 1901. He resumed the practice of law. He died in Brooklyn, New York, September 25, 1910. He was interred in Greenwood Cemetery.

== Sources ==
- United States Congress. "Francis H. Wilson (id: W000579)". Biographical Directory of the United States Congress.

U.S. House of Representatives
| Preceded by Joseph C. Hendrix | Member of the U.S. House of Representatives from New York's 3rd congressional district March 4, 1895 – September 30, 1897 | Succeeded by Edmund H. Driggs |
