= Otto G. Foelker =

American politician (1875–1943)

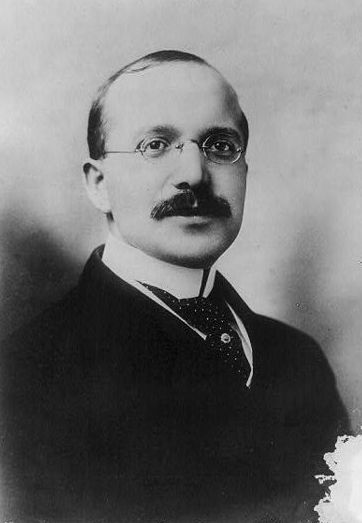

Member of the U.S. House of Representatives from New York's 3rd district
- In office 1908–1911
- Preceded by: Charles T. Dunwell
- Succeeded by: James P. Maher

Member of the New York House of Representatives from the 4th district
- In office 1905–1906
- Preceded by: John E. Bullwinkel
- Succeeded by: George W. Brown

Member of the New York Senate from the 4th district
- In office 1907–1908
- Preceded by: John Drescher, Jr.
- Succeeded by: R. L. Gledhill

Personal details
- Born: December 29, 1875 Mainz, Germany
- Died: January 18, 1943 (aged 67) Oakland, California, USA
- Resting place: Evergreen Cemetery, Oakland, California

Otto Godfrey Foelker (December 29, 1875 – January 18, 1943) was an American politician from New York.

== Life ==
Foelker was born in Mainz, Germany, and immigrated to the United States in 1888 with his parents. They settled in Troy, New York, where he attended public schools. He moved to Brooklyn in December 1895 and studied law in the New York Law School. He was admitted to the bar in 1908 and commenced practice in Brooklyn.

He was a member of the New York State Assembly (Kings Co., 5th D.) in 1905 and 1906; and of the New York State Senate (4th D.) in 1907 and 1908.

Foelker was elected as a Republican to the 60th United States Congress to fill the vacancy caused by the death of Charles T. Dunwell. He was at the same time elected to the 61st United States Congress, holding office from November 3, 1908, to March 3, 1911. Afterwards Foelker moved to California and resumed the practice of law in Oakland, where he died on January 18, 1943. He was interred at Evergreen Cemetery in Oakland.

New York State Assembly
Preceded by John E. Bullwinkel	New York State Assembly; Kings County, 4th District; 1905-1906	Succeeded by George W. Brown
New York State Senate
Preceded by John Drescher, Jr.	New York State Senate; 4th District; 1907–1908	Succeeded by R. L. Gledhill
U.S. House of Representatives
Preceded by Charles T. Dunwell	Member of the U.S. House of Representatives from New York's 3rd congressional district 1908–1911	Succeeded by James P. Maher
