= James S. Alexander =

American banker (1865–1932)

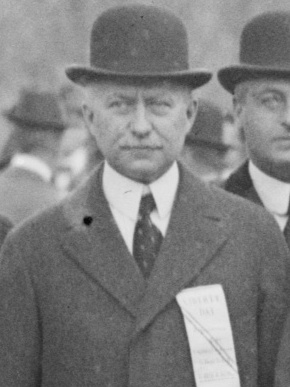
- Alexander in 1917
- Born: January 21, 1865; Tarrytown, New York
- Died: July 16, 1932 (aged 67); New York City
- Occupation: banker
- Spouse: Anna Pomeroy
- Children: Emma Myer Alexander & James Strange Alexander III

James Strange Alexander Jr. (February 21, 1865 – July 16, 1932) was an American banker from New York who served as president of the National Bank of Commerce in New York and chairman of the board of the Guaranty Trust Company.

== Early life ==
Alexander was born on February 21, 1865, in Tarrytown, New York. He was a son of James Strange Alexander Sr. (1814–1889) and Susan Coe (née Elting) Alexander (1835–1902). Among his siblings was brothers Frank William Alexander and Charles Elting Alexander.

After receiving a public school education in Tarrytown, he took a position as a clerk in a general store at age thirteen. At age sixteen, he took a position as clerk in the Tarrytown National Bank. Within three years, he was assistant to the cashier of the bank.

== Career ==
In 1885, Alexander became a junior clerk at the National Bank of Commerce in New York at a salary of $10 a week. He remained with the bank for fifteen years, advancing to assistant cashier and chief clerk. In 1907, he left to become treasurer of the American Express Company. The National Bank of Commerce, however, lured him back in less than a year making him vice president. Three years later in 1911, he was made president of the bank. In 1923, Alexander became chairman of the board of directors, and Stevenson E. Ward became president. In 1929, when the bank merged into the Guaranty Trust Company, he became chairman of the board of the combined entity. Alexander retired as chairman of the board on January 1, 1930.

Alexander was chairman of the executive committee of the National Committee on European Finance, a member of the advisory committee of the American section of the International Chamber of Commerce and a member of the committee on finance and currency of the Chamber of Commerce of the State of New York.

=== Board involvement ===
During World War I, he was a member of the Liberty Loan Committee and secretary of the Federal Reserve District. From 1926 to 1928, he was a member of the advisory committee of the Federal Reserve Board. He also served as a director of the American Telephone and Telegraph Company, the Mercantile Stores Company, Pacific Oil Company, Prudential Insurance Company of America, the Southern Pacific Company and the Winifred Masterson Burke Relief Foundation. He was a member of the New York Clearing House Committee from 1913 to 1916, chairman of the committee on finance from 1919 to 1921, ultimately being elected president in 1923.

He was a director of the American Arbitration Association and a member of the American Museum of Natural History, the Metropolitan Museum of Art, and the Japan Society.

== Personal life ==
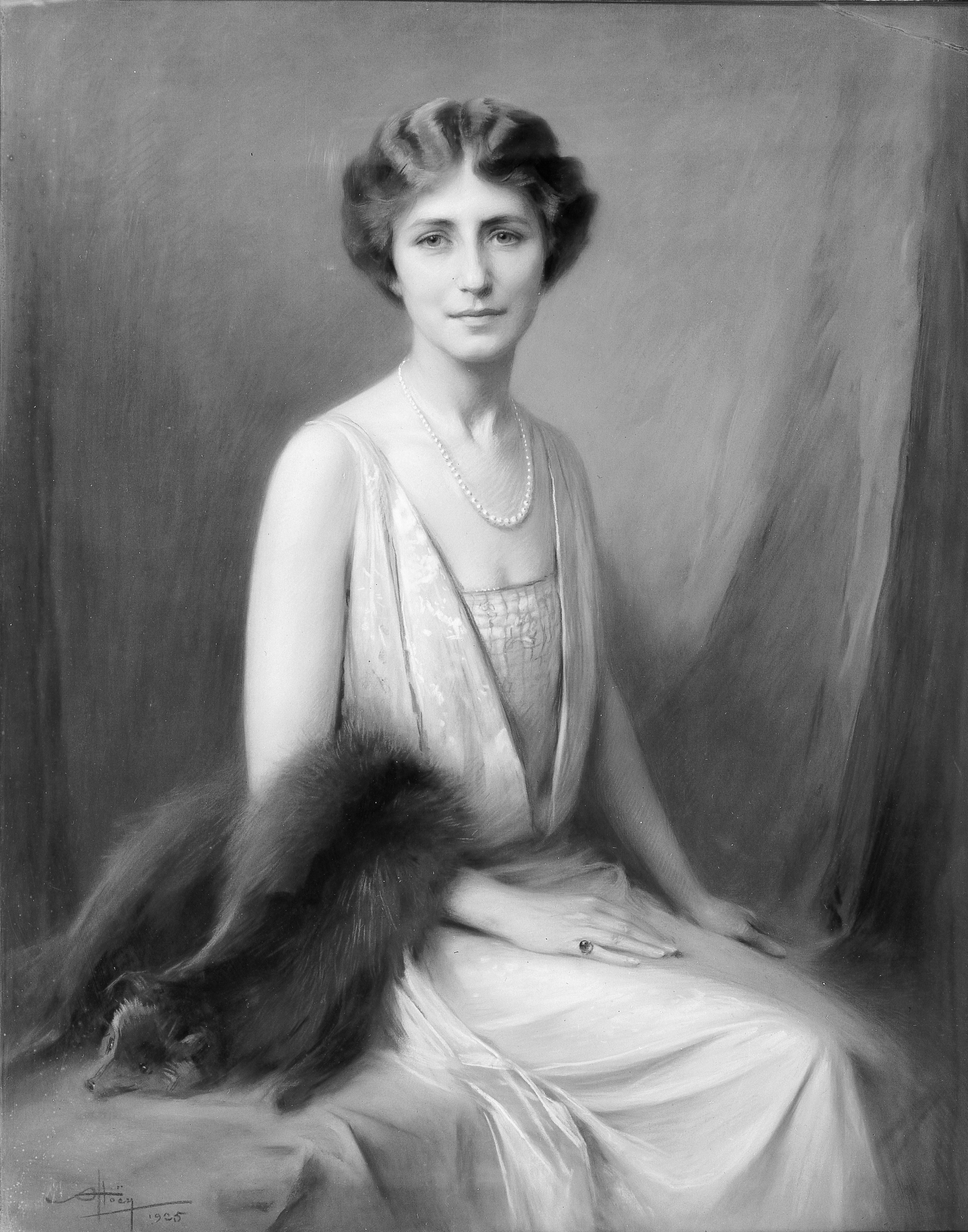
Portrait of his daughter, Emma, by Hoëy, 1925.

Alexander was married to Anna Pomeroy (d. 1936). Together, they were the parents of:

- Emma Myer Alexander (1891–1973), who married Lesley Green Sheafer (c. 1890–1956), a New York stockbroker with Jesup & Lamont.
- James Strange Alexander III (1896–1985), who married Hortense Clapp Heywood (1896–1987), a daughter of Edith Clapp and Lincoln Heywood, in 1920.

Alexander died of a heart attack on July 16, 1932, at his home, the Drake Hotel at 440 Park Avenue in New York City. He was buried at Sleepy Hollow Cemetery in Sleepy Hollow, New York. His estate was left to his family with two-fifths going to his son, two-fifths going to his daughter, $10,000 going to his widow, who was then living at 139 East 79th Street and several bequests to his brothers, employees and friends. The net value of the estate was $1,011,135.

=== Honors and awards ===
Alexander was made a Chevalier of the Legion of Honour of France, a Chevalier of the Crown of Italy by King Victor Emmanuel III of Italy, and a Knight of the Belgian Order of Leopold II.
