= Joseph C. Hendrix =

American politician

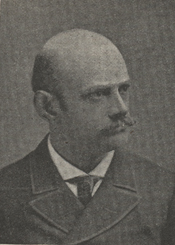

Member of the U.S. House of Representatives from New York's 3rd district
- In office March 4, 1893 – March 3, 1895
- Preceded by: William J. Coombs
- Succeeded by: Francis H. Wilson

Personal details
- Born: May 25, 1853 Fayette, Missouri
- Died: November 9, 1904 (aged 51) Brooklyn, New York
- Party: Democratic Party
- Education: Central College; Cornell University

Joseph Clifford Hendrix (May 25, 1853 – November 9, 1904) was an American educator and politician who served one term as a U.S. representative from New York from 1893 to 1895.

== Biography ==
Born in Fayette, Missouri, Hendrix attended private schools and Central College at Fayette and Cornell University, Ithaca, New York from 1870 to 1873.

He moved to New York City in 1873 and worked for the New York Sun. He was appointed a member of the Board of Education of Brooklyn in 1882. He was an unsuccessful Democratic candidate for mayor of Brooklyn in 1883. He was appointed trustee of the New York and Brooklyn Bridge in 1884.

Hendrix was elected secretary of the board of bridge trustees in 1885. He was appointed postmaster of Brooklyn by President Cleveland in 1886 and served until July 1, 1890.

Hendrix was elected president of the board of education of Brooklyn in 1887. He served as president of the Kings County Trust Co. in 1889–1893. He served as president of the National Union Bank of New York City in 1893–1900.

=== Congress ===
Hendrix was elected as a Democrat to the 53rd United States Congress, though was not a candidate for renomination in 1894.

=== Later career and death ===
He served as President of the National Bank of Commerce in 1900, as a Trustee of the Brooklyn Institute of Arts and Sciences, and as a Trustee of Cornell University. He died in Brooklyn, New York on November 9, 1904 and was interred in Green-Wood Cemetery.

== Sources ==
- United States Congress. "Joseph C. Hendrix (id: H000496)". Biographical Directory of the United States Congress.

U.S. House of Representatives
Preceded by William J. Coombs	Member of the U.S. House of Representatives from New York's 3rd congressional district March 4, 1893 – March 3, 1895	Succeeded by Francis H. Wilson
