= James N. Jarvie =

James Newbegin Jarvie (1853 – June 21, 1929) was a British-American merchant and philanthropist who was known as the "Coffee King".

== Early life ==
Jarvie was born in Manchester, England, in 1853, a son of William and Isabella Jarvie. He had two sisters, only one of whom married. At the age of two in 1855, he came to the United States with his family and grew up in Brooklyn, New York, and Bloomfield, New Jersey.

== Career ==
Jarvie became interested in the coffee business, joining and eventually becoming partner in Arbuckle Brothers, a New York-based coffee and sugar commodities firm, eventually withdrawing in 1906 to focus on his other concerns. Jarvie was an adviser to many corporations and served on the boards of the Central Hanover Bank & Trust Company, Guarantee Trust Company, Mutual Alliance Trust Company, and Southern Pacific Company, and the National Bank of Commerce in New York, among others.

He also invested in New York real estate, owning properties in the "Old Dry Goods District", including 332 Broadway (bought from the Henry Dolan estate), which was occupied by a five-story building adjoining the Tefft-Weller building (on the site of Broadway Theatre), at 326-330 Broadway (which he leased to the Tower Manufacturing and Novelty Company) which gave him a combined 100 feet frontage on Broadway between Worth and Pearl Streets.

== Personal life ==
On August 28, 1909, Jarvie was married to Helen Venderveer Newtown, a daughter of Bloomfield coal dealer John Newton. His best man was his nephew James Turner. Upon his marriage Jarvie reportedly gifted his sister, May Scott Jarvie, who lived with him, $1,000,000 with which she purchased her own home to live in after his marriage. In 1912, his wife was killed in an explosion on a yacht at New London, Connecticut.

Although he lived in Brooklyn for many years, Jarvie lived the last twenty-five years of his life in a mansion at 159 Upper Mountain Avenue in Montclair, New Jersey, which was referred to as "one of the largest and most beautiful in Montclair", and was robbed of all its silver in 1912. Jarvie died at sea on the Homeric en route to England, on June 21, 1929. His body was returned to America and he was buried at Bloomfield Cemetery in Bloomfield, New Jersey.

=== Philanthropy ===
Jarvie was known for his generous philanthropy. He donated significant funds to the Presbyterian Church and to Presbyterian-affiliated entities. He was an incorporator of the Presbyterian Board of National Missions and made substantial contributions toward the renovation and rebuilding of the Westminster Presbyterian Church in Bloomfield, New Jersey. In addition, he donated $1,000,000 to Columbia University so the school could open a Dental School, and $50,000 to the Bloomfield Public Library.

In 1925, Jarvie created and endowed the $14,000,000 Jarvie Commonweal Service, known today as the Jarvie Program, which was established to "aid temporarily handicapped 'white-collar' workers". From its inception until his death, Jarvie personally directed the program. After his death in 1929, "the Service was led by a board of directors, and in 1934, responsibility for managing the endowment fund and operating the Service was transferred to the Presbyterian Board of National Missions. From 1973 until 1987 it was handled by the Program Agency; in 1987 it became part of the Social Justice and Peacemaking Unit.
