= Pelatiah Webster =

Pelatiah Webster (born 1726 in Lebanon, Connecticut, died 1795 in Philadelphia, Pennsylvania) was an American merchant, clergyman, and (from the beginning of the American Revolution) author of short essays concerning the finances and government of the fledgling United States. He took a strongly-laissez-faire position economically, and was a proponent of what would become the Constitution of the United States.

== Quotes ==
"I propose ... to take off every restraint and limitation from our commerce. Let trade be as free as air. Let every man make the most of his goods in his own way and then he will be satisfied."

"The Continental money is to be considered as a debt fastened on the person and estate of every member of the United States, a debt of great honor and justice, of national honor and justice, not barely empty honor, but that essential honor and credit in which the safety of the state is comprised, and therefore by confession of every body must be punctually and honorably paid in due time; otherwise all security arising from public credit must be lost, all confidence of individuals in our public councils must be destroyed, and great injustice must be done to every possessor of our public currency, to the detriment of all, and ruin of many who have placed most confidence in our public administration: and nothing but shame, scandal, and contempt can ensue, for which nothing but most inevitable necessity can be any reasonable excuse."

== Death ==
Webster was originally interred at the Second Presbyterian Church in Philadelphia, Pennsylvania. In 1867 his remains were reinterred to Mount Vernon Cemetery.

== Sources ==
Taylor, Hannis: A memorial in behalf of the architect of our Federal Constitution, Pelatiah Webster of Philadelphia, Pa. General Publishing Office, Washington, D.C. 1908.
