= James Alexander (British politician, born 1769) =

British politician and private banker

James Alexander (1769 – 12 September 1848) was an Irish-born officer of the British East India Company who sat in the House of Commons of the United Kingdom in two periods from 1812 to 1832.

Born in County Londonderry, Alexander joined the East India Company in 1784, and later became a partner in a merchant bank in Calcutta. His time in India gained him huge wealth.

He returned to the United Kingdom in 1818, and bought an estate in Hampshire. In 1820, he and his brother, Josias, jointly purchased the rotten borough of Old Sarum from their cousin, the 2nd Earl of Caledon, who had been arranging the return of James to Parliament since 1812, having previously arranged the return of another brother, Henry Alexander.

Parliament of the United Kingdom
| Preceded by Nicholas Vansittart; Josias Porcher | Member of Parliament for Old Sarum; May 1812 – 1832; With: Josias Porcher 1812–1818; Arthur Johnston Crawford 1818–1820; Josias Alexander 1820–1828; Stratford Canning 1828–1830; Josias Alexander 1830–1832 | Constituency abolished |
