= Union League Club =

Social club in New York City

The Union League Club
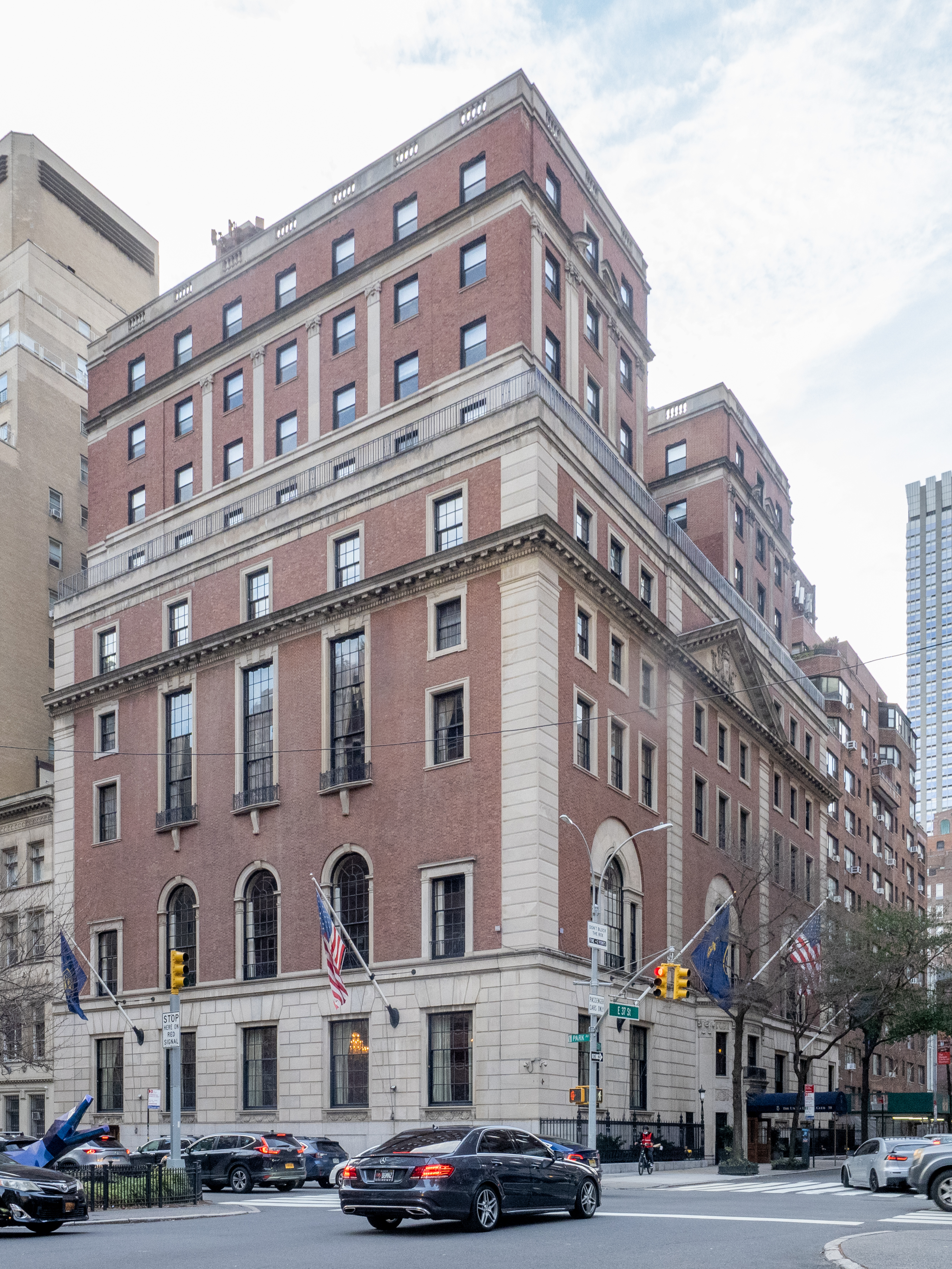
- Exterior of the clubhouse in 2022
- Formation: 1863; 163 years ago
- Type: Private social club
- Tax ID no.: 13-1423100
- Location(s): 38 East 37th Street New York, New York
- Coordinates: 40°44′56″N 73°58′50″W
- Affiliations: Union League
- Website: unionleagueclub.org

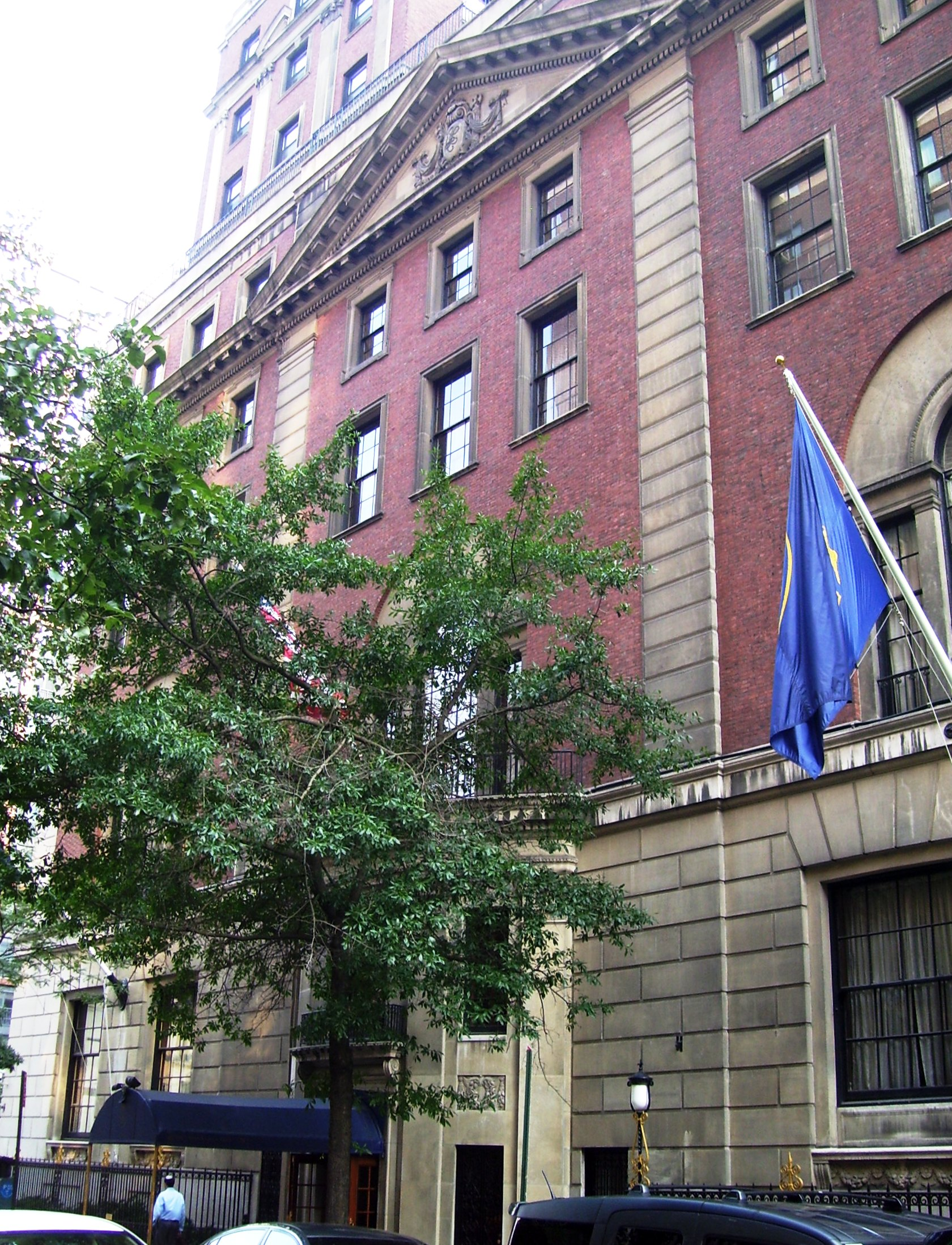
The club's main entrance

The Union League Club is a private social club in New York City that was founded in 1863 in affiliation with the Union League. Its fourth and current clubhouse is located at 38 East 37th Street on the corner of Park Avenue, in the Murray Hill neighborhood of Manhattan. It was designed by Benjamin Wistar Morris and opened on February 2, 1931. The building was designated a New York City landmark on October 25, 2011. The club is one of the most prestigious in New York City.

Union League clubs, which are legally separate but share similar histories and maintain reciprocal links with one another, are also located in Chicago and Philadelphia. Additional Union League clubs were formerly located in Brooklyn, New York, and New Haven, Connecticut.

== History ==
The club dates its founding from February 6, 1863, during the American Civil War. Tensions were running high in New York City at the time, because much of the city's governing class bitterly opposed the war and were eager to reach some kind of accommodation with the Confederate States of America. Thus, pro-Union men chose to form their own club, with the twin goals of cultivating "a profound national devotion" and to "strengthen a love and respect for the Union." A foundational article of the club was the duty to resist and expose corruption, as well as to elevate the idea of American citizenship in the country.

The Union League (also known as Loyal Leagues) was actually a political movement before it became a social organization. Its members raised money both to support the United States Sanitary Commission, the forerunner of the American Red Cross, which cared for the Union wounded following battles, and the Union cause generally.

The New York League was founded by four prominent professionals and intellectuals: Henry Whitney Bellows, Frederick Law Olmsted, George Templeton Strong, and Oliver Wolcott Gibbs. The men, all members of the United States Sanitary Commission, desired to strengthen the nation state and the national identity. They first aimed to recruit a coalition of moneyed professionals like themselves. Strong believed that the club would only thrive with a respectable catalogue of moneyed men. Olmsted especially desired to recruit the new generation of young, wealthy men, so that the club might teach them the obligations and duties of the upper class.

The founders aimed to win the political governing elite over to support the Union and to abolish slavery. They also believed that a centralized government was essential to their prosperity. The national government enforced contracts, tariffs, and an expanding infrastructure, all in the best interest of the professionals in the merchant, financial, and manufacturing classes, which in turn, benefited the population at large. These professionals also developed an economic interest in the federal government, because as the war progressed, Union League ideas had their effect and New York City's elite bore a disproportional amount of the nation's debt. As they bought more and more war bonds, the holders had an increasing economic interest in the success of the Union, in addition to the convictions that led them to buy the bonds in the first place.

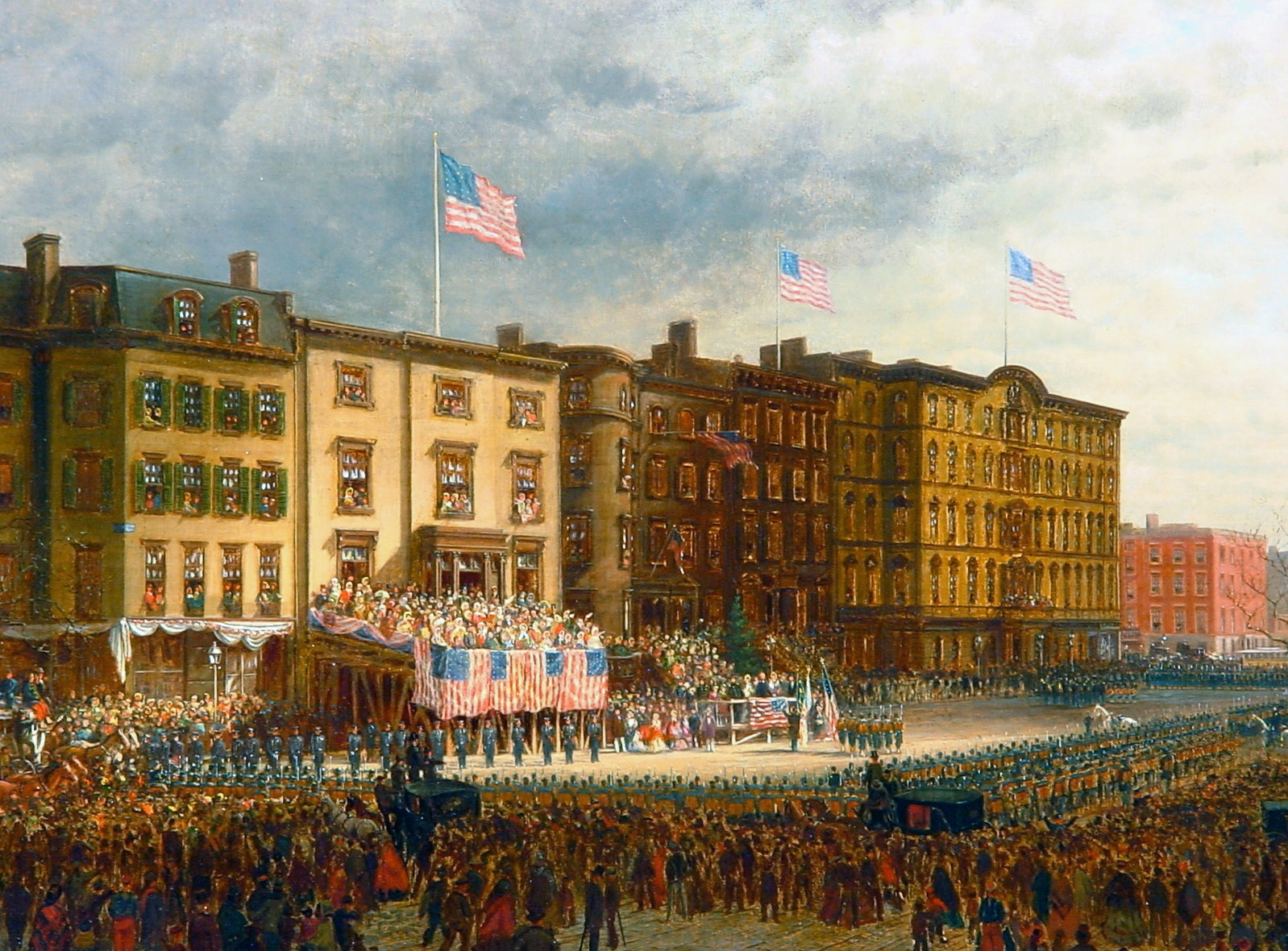
Edward Lamson Henry's Presentation of Colors, 1864, depicts the outfitting of two African-American regiments at the Union League Club of New York's first clubhouse on 17th Street, facing Union Square

The club held its first official meeting on March 20, 1863. At this first meeting, Robert B. Minturn, head of the nation's second largest shipping firm, was elected president. Some of the elected vice presidents included William H. Aspinwall, Moses Taylor, and Alexander T. Stewart.

It did not take long for the club's enemies to make their displeasure felt with the new organization. On July 13, 1863, just five months after the club's foundation and only days after receiving word of the twin Union victories at Gettysburg and at Vicksburg, the New York Draft Riots exploded right in the club's backyard. The Union League Club was high on the vandals' list of targets (right after the Colored Orphan Asylum), but some brave members kept them at bay by maintaining an armed vigil in the locked and barricaded clubhouse on East 17th Street, just off Union Square Park.

A few months later, the members decided to make an unmistakable gesture that they had not been intimidated. Authorized by the U.S. War Department, the club decided to recruit, train and equip a Colored infantry regiment for Union service. The 20th U.S. Colored Infantry was formed on Riker's Island in February 1864. The next month, it marched from the Union League Club, down Canal Street and over to the Hudson River piers to embark for duty in Louisiana. In spite of numerous threats, the members of the Union League Club marched with the men of the 20th, and saw them off. During World War I, the club sponsored the 369th Infantry, the famed Harlem Hellfighters, which was commanded by William Hayward, a club member.

During Reconstruction, a major era of civil rights changes, Union Leagues were formed all across the South. They mobilized freedmen to register to vote. They discussed political issues, promoted civic projects, and mobilized workers opposed to segregationist white employers. Most branches were segregated but there were a few that were racially integrated. The leaders of the all-black units were mostly urban Blacks from the North, who had never been slaves. Foner (p 283) says "virtually every Black voter in the South had enrolled." Black League members were special targets of the Ku Klux Klan's violence and intimidation, so the Leagues organized informal armed defense units.

After the end of Reconstruction, the Union League Club of New York devoted itself to civic projects and clean government. It and its members helped to found the Metropolitan Museum of Art, Grant's Tomb, and the Statue of Abraham Lincoln on Union Square, Manhattan. They also assisted in building the Statue of Liberty by raising funds through Edouard de Laboulaye and William Maxwell Evarts, as well as funding the Statue's pedestal through a committee chaired by member John Jay.

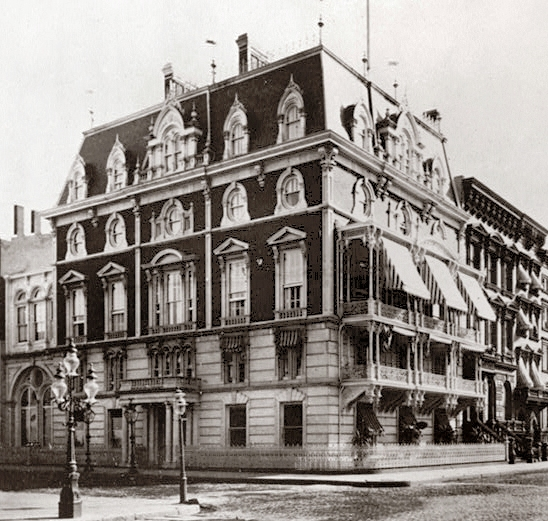
The club's second headquarters, the Jerome Mansion on Madison Avenue

== Previous clubhouses ==
The ULC's first clubhouse, built in 1863 was at 26 East 17th Street, facing Union Square. The second clubhouse was the Jerome Mansion, the childhood home of Winston S. Churchill's mother Jennie Jerome, at Madison Avenue and East 26th Street, facing Madison Square Park (1868).

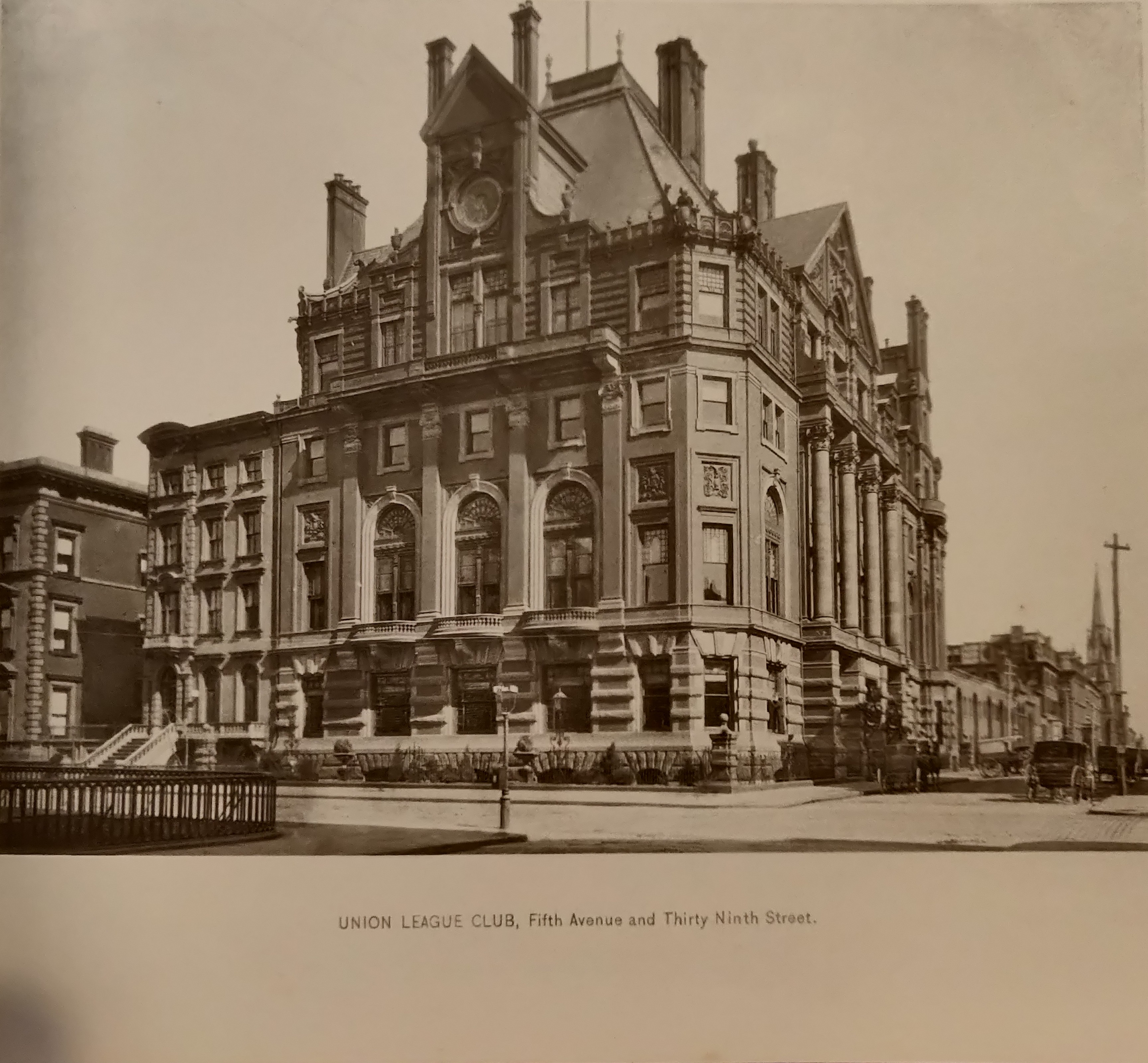
Third clubouse, designed by Peabody & Stearns, seen in 1890

The club then moved to Fifth Avenue and West 39th Street (1881); the building included decor designed by Frank Hill Smith, John La Farge, Augustus Saint-Gaudens, and Will Hicok Low. The club remained there until the move to the present building at 37th Street and Park Avenue. The property was purchased from J.P. Morgan II. Unlike many club buildings, the current clubhouse is purpose-built, rather than being a converted mansion or building constructed for another purpose.

== Membership ==
The club has always promoted clean government and public-spiritedness. Many of its early members, notably cartoonist Thomas Nast, were instrumental in breaking "Boss" Tweed's corrupted political organization. (A future club president, Elihu Root, served as one of Tweed's defense counsels.) Manhattan District Attorney and club member Charles S. Whitman used the privacy afforded by the club to secretly interview witnesses during his investigation of the case that sent NYPD Lt. Charles Becker, a corrupt police officer, to the electric chair in 1915. Whitman had previously founded the Night Court and was elected New York Governor as a result of the trial.

Fifteen U.S. presidents have been members of the club, and two, Theodore Roosevelt and Chester A. Arthur, were members prior to entering the White House. Two former presidents, Ulysses S. Grant and Herbert Hoover, were active members after leaving office.

Theodore Roosevelt was blackballed when he first applied for membership in 1881, possibly because his mother, Martha Bulloch Roosevelt, was a well-known Confederate sympathizer. Following the sudden deaths of his wife and mother in 1884, however, he was offered membership and accepted. After running on the Bull Moose Party ticket in 1912, Roosevelt was persona non grata at the club for several years, being welcomed back after the United States entered World War I.

Press reports from April 1893 indicated the club at that time refused membership to Jews. Theodore Seligman was blackballed by the membership despite the fact is father was a member of long standing.

From its founding as a men's club, the members decided to admit women in the mid-1980s. Faith Whittlesey, President Reagan's Ambassador to Switzerland was the first female member (1986). Women now play prominent roles in the club's leadership including the Board of Governors, the Admissions Committee, the Public Affairs Committee, and the House Committee. In 2020, the club elected its first woman president, Mary Beth Sullivan.

Among the Honorary Members were Sandra Day O'Connor, Henry Kissinger, Neil Armstrong, Margaret Thatcher, Antonin Scalia, Brent Scowcroft, Barbara Bush, and H. Norman Schwarzkopf.

The club has a strong artistic tradition (see list of members below). Some artist-members in the 19th century contributed paintings to the club in lieu of dues, and these remain part of the club's collection.

=== Notable members ===
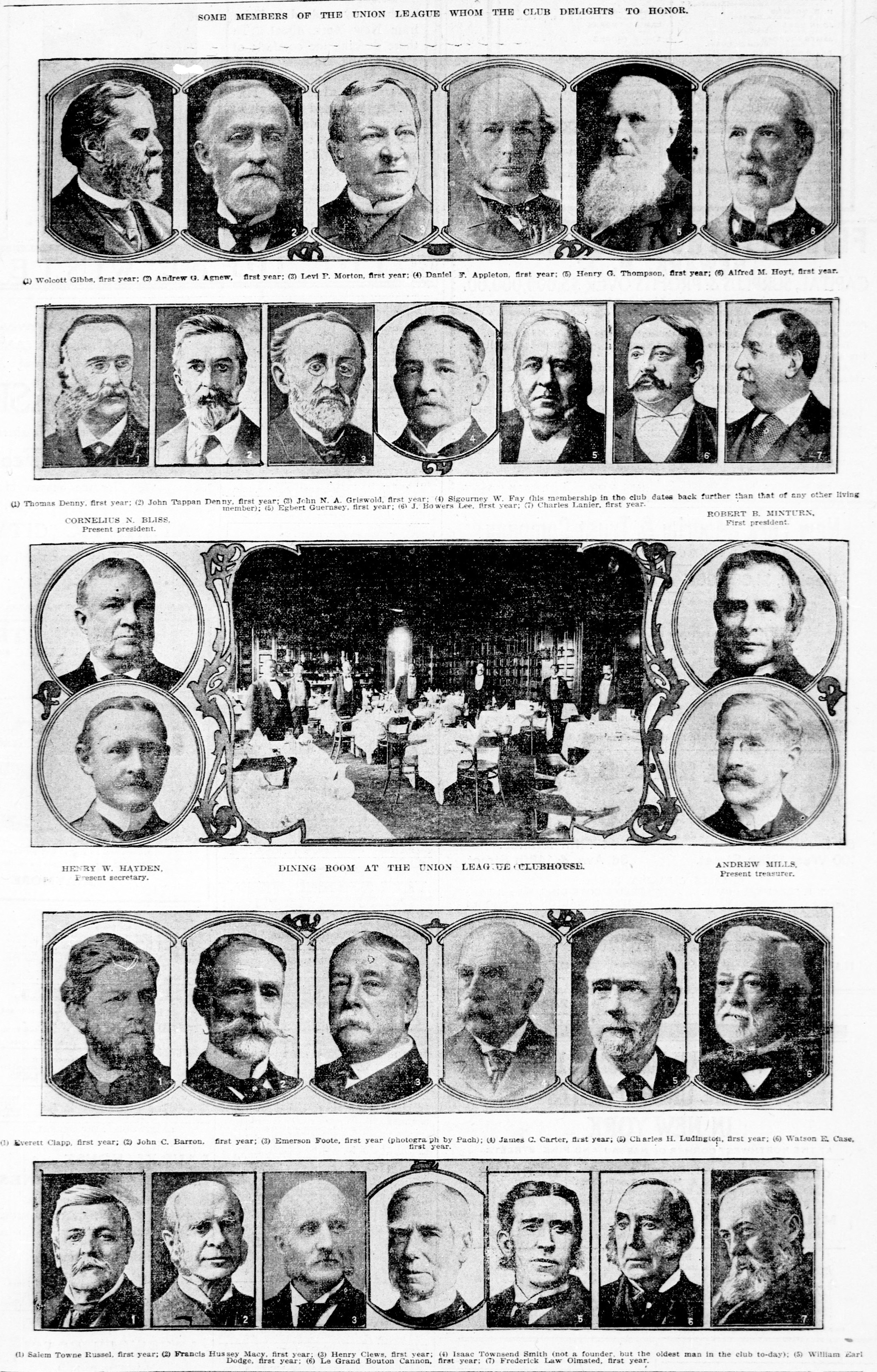
Some league members from 1903

- Abraham Lincoln, 16th President of the United States, led the Union
- Ulysses S. Grant, Commanding General, United States Army, 18th President of the United States
- George B. Adams, federal judge;
- Chester A. Arthur, 21st President of the United States
- Henry Whitney Bellows, Clergyman and social reformer
- Albert Bierstadt, Hudson River School artist
- Cornelius Newton Bliss, 21st United States Secretary of the Interior, club president, 1902–1906
- Isaac Vail Brokaw, founder of Brokaw Brothers and housing group on 5th Ave
- William Cullen Bryant, poet and editor of the New York Post
- George H. W. Bush, 41st President of the United States
- George W. Bush, 43rd President of the United States
- Willard C. Butcher, Chairman and CEO of Chase Manhattan Bank
- Thomas B. Clarke, art collector and chairman of the art committee
- Samuel Colman, Hudson River School artist
- Peter Cooper, inventor and philanthropist
- Jasper Francis Cropsey, Hudson River School artist
- Noah Davis, Judge for the New York Supreme Court, club vice president
- Henry Pomeroy Davison, Chairman of the War Council (WWI) of the American Red Cross
- Chauncey Depew, U.S. senator, corporate lawyer; club president, 1886–1892
- John Ericsson, Swedish-American inventor of the USS Monitor
- William M. Evarts, 29th U.S. Attorney General; 27th Secretary of State of the United States; club president, 1882–1885
- Milton Ezrati, Chief Economist at Vested
- Cyrus West Field, "Father" of the Atlantic cable
- Sanford Robinson Gifford, Hudson River School artist
- Martin Johnson Heade, Hudson River School artist
- Herbert Hoover, Engineer, humanitarian, 31st President of the United States
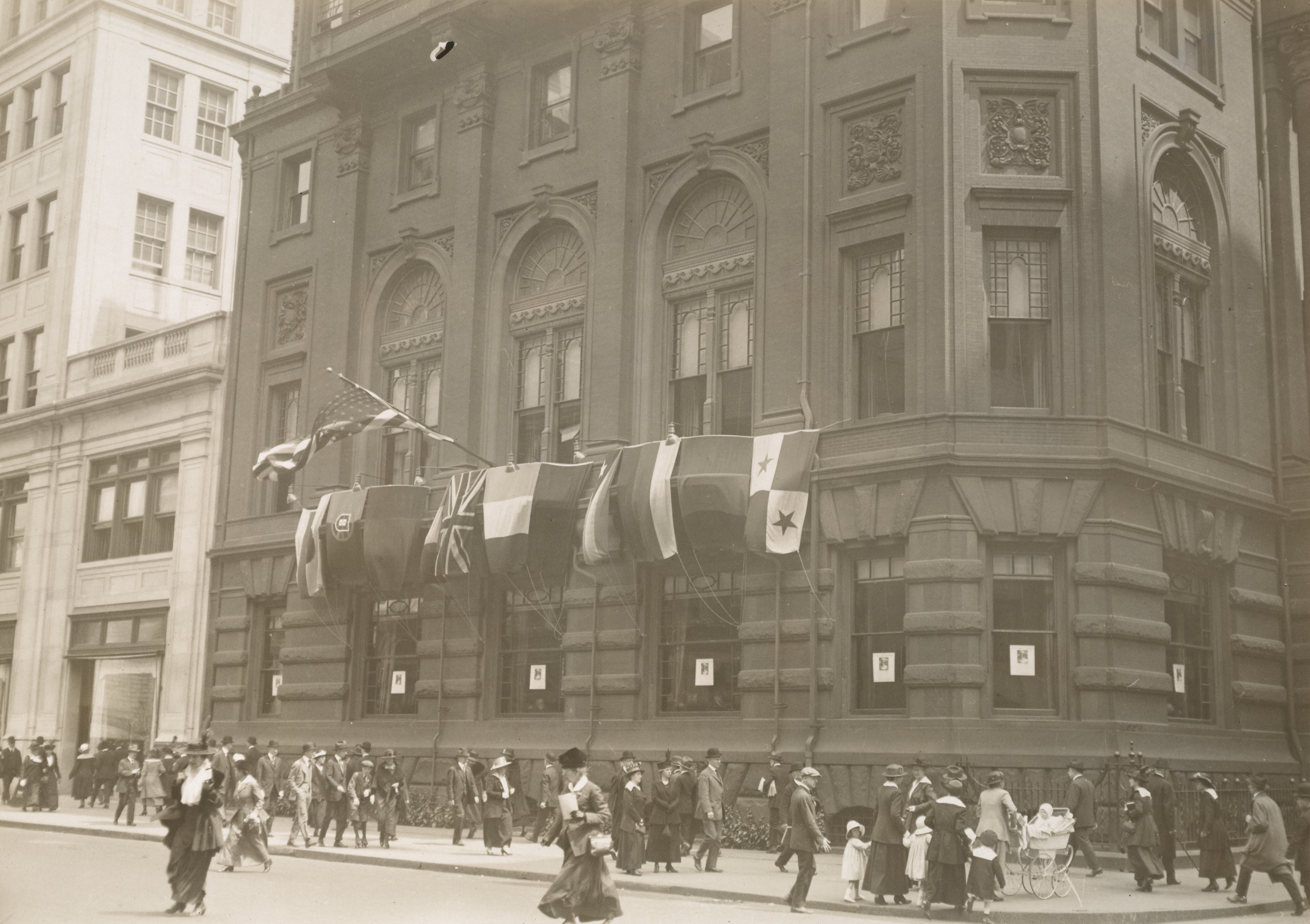
- Display of Allied flags at the Union League Club in 1918
  Charles Evans Hughes, 44th Secretary of State of the United States, 11th Chief Justice, U.S. Supreme Court; club president, 1917–1919
- Daniel Huntington, Genre artist
- Jack H. Jacobs, Medal of Honor recipient
- John Jay, son of Founding Father John Jay and U.S. Minister to Austria-Hungary
- Eastman Johnson, 19th century American artist
- John Stewart Kennedy, American businessman, financier and philanthropist
- John Frederick Kensett, Hudson River School artist
- Lawrence Kudlow, Fox Business Channel host, Director of the National Economic Council under President Donald Trump.
- Emanuel Leutze, American history painter
- Homer Loring, American industrialist, died in his room at the club
- Alfred Erskine Marling, Real estate developer; club president, 1928–1930
- Nelson A. Miles, Union Civil War general. Last man to hold the title Commanding General of the United States Army
- J.P. Morgan, Wall Street financier
- J.P. Morgan Jr., Wall Street financier
- Levi P. Morton, 22nd Vice President of the United States, 31st Governor of New York
- Thomas Nast, Political cartoonist and artist
- Frederick Law Olmsted, landscape architect, designer of Central Park
- Charles Henry Parkhurst, clergyman and social reformer who broke Boss Tweed's ring
- Horace Porter, Union Army officer, personal secretary to General and President Ulysses S. Grant, U.S. Ambassador to France, club president, 1893–1897
- Frederic Remington, Western artist
- J.D. Rockefeller, founder of Standard Oil
- Theodore Roosevelt, Rough Rider, 33rd New York Governor, 26th President of the United States
- Elihu Root, 41st Secretary of War, 38th Secretary of State of the United States, club president, 1898–1899; 1915–1916
- Joseph Seligman, Banker, philanthropist
- Elliott Fitch Shepard, lawyer and banker
- William T. Sherman, Union Civil War general
- George Templeton Strong, Civil War diarist, Union League founding member
- Salem Howe Wales, journalist, reformist politician, and philanthropist
- Charles S. Whitman, 41st New York Governor and Manhattan District Attorney
- Faith Ryan Whittlesey, Ambassador to Switzerland and Assistant to Ronald Reagan for Public Liaison
- Worthington Whittredge, Hudson River School and Western artist
- William Woodin, 51st U.S. Secretary of the Treasury
- John B. Yale, Telegraph and railroad entrepreneur of the Yale family
- Julian L. Yale, Chicago railroad entrepreneur of the Yale family

== See also ==
- Union League
- Union League of Philadelphia
- Union League Club of Chicago
- Union League Golf and Country Club
- List of American gentlemen's clubs
