= Jim Alexander (footballer) =

Australian rules footballer

Personal information
- Full name: James Ernest Alexander
- Born: 15 March 1899; Essendon, Victoria
- Died: 2 December 1972 (aged 73); Dandenong, Victoria
- Original team: Ascot Vale

Playing career^{1}
| Years | Club | Games (Goals) |
| 1918–19 | Essendon | 5 (1) |
- ^{1} Playing statistics correct to the end of 1919.

James Ernest Alexander (15 March 1899 – 2 December 1972) was an Australian rules footballer who played with Essendon in the Victorian Football League (VFL).
