= Francis William Edmonds =

American painter

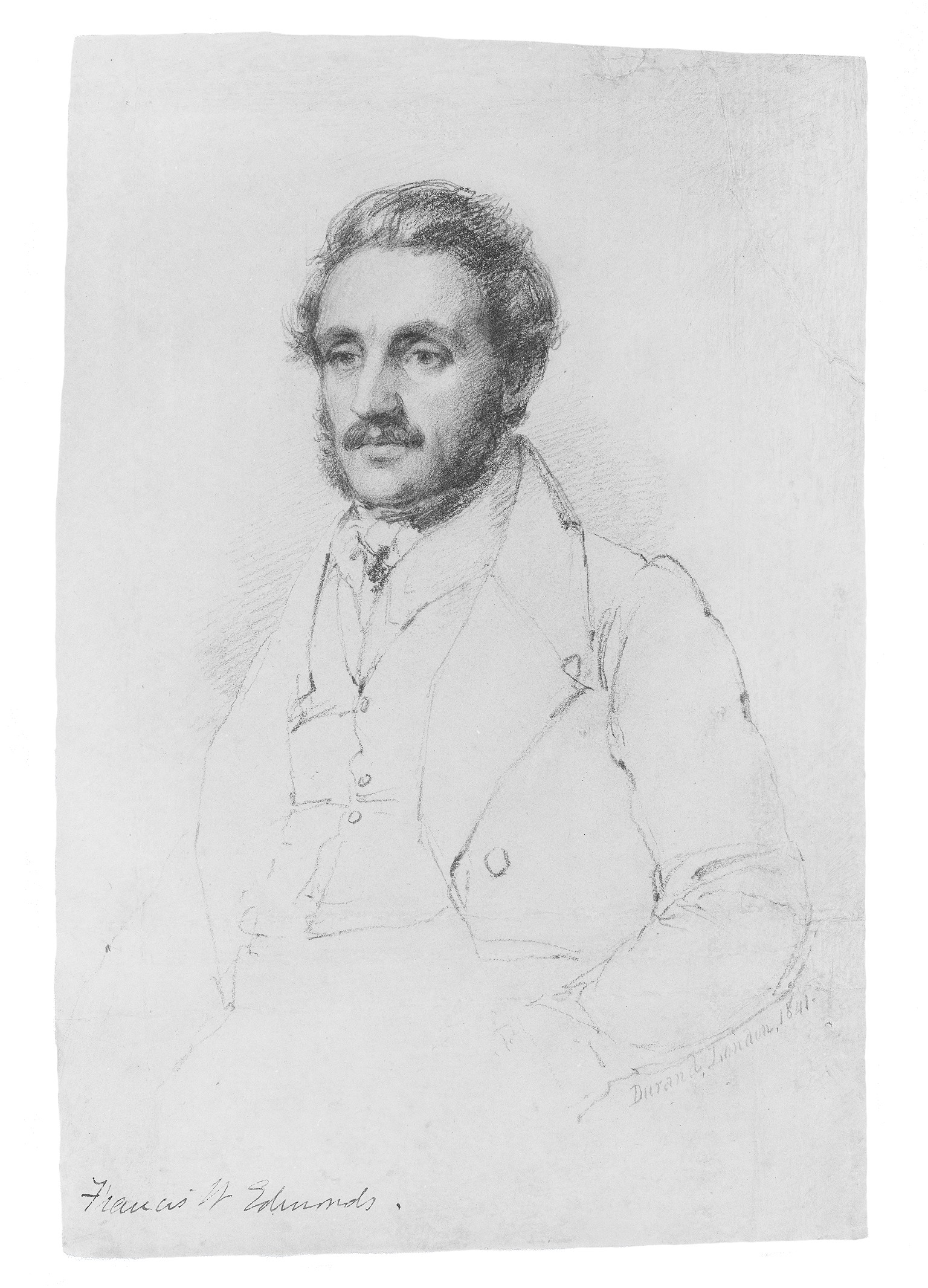
- Drawing of Edmonds by Asher Brown Durand (1841)
- Born: November 22, 1806; Hudson, New York
- Died: February 7, 1863 (aged 56); Bronxville, New York
- Citizenship: US
- Known for: American genre painting
- Notable work: Sammy the Tailor
- Spouse: Martha Norman (m. 1831; died 1840)
- Children: daughter Nora

Francis William Edmonds (November 22, 1806 – February 7, 1863) was an American painter of genre subjects. He often painted in the style of 17th century Dutch painters. He kept up his painting career as well as a career in banking.

== Early life ==
He was born on November 22, 1806, in Hudson, New York, one child in a large Quaker family. He was skilled in drawing but found that it was too expensive to get training in etching as he wished. Instead, he followed the path of an uncle into the business of banking.

== Career ==
He was engaged during the greater part of his life as a cashier in a bank, starting in 1823 in the Tradesmen's Bank of New York. The schools of the National Academy of Design opened in 1826, which stimulated him to improve his artistic skills. He registered as a "student of the antique" from 1827 to 1830, while continuing at the bank.

He first exhibited his painting Sammy the Tailor, painted in 1836, at the National Academy of Design in New York City. He exhibited this painting under the pseudonym E. F. Williams, as he was unsure of its reception. "Edmonds was surprised by Sammy the Tailor's warm reception and encouraged by its success to continue to paint."

This was followed, among other works, by Dominie Sampson in 1837, the Penny Paper in 1839, Sparking in 1840, Stealing Milk in 1843, Vesuvius and Florence in 1844, Bargaining in 1858, and The New Bonnet in 1859.

In 1838 he was elected an associate of the National Academy of Design, and in 1840 an academician. Edmonds was also active in the American Art-Union.

He devoted his mornings and evenings to painting, while maintaining his career in banking. His wife died in 1840 and he had a nervous breakdown so he went to Europe for rest for a year. Otherwise, he produced two to three paintings each year, in the manner of 17th century Dutch painting. His subjects were often literary and he had a touch of humor in his approach.

After about 1854, his genre painting, which continued throughout this period of his life, shifted in later years toward rural themes, a likely reflection of his increasing remove from day-to-day affairs in New York City.

== Reception ==
Edmonds's paintings were well received in his lifetime and are in museums across the US. He is recognized [by whom? refs?] to be following the Scottish painter Wilkie. A book in 1867 "credited Edmonds with popularizing "humorous every-day-life-scenes" whose "homely" subjects and "naïve literalness" appealed to "average taste."" The purchasers of his paintings did not consider their own taste to be average; rather they felt they bought truly American art. Edmonds's "art consistently garnered positive critical commentary throughout the 1840s and 1850s, the decades during which he frequently exhibited paintings". His "genre paintings with contemporary settings and identifiably American narratives were instantly legible to the majority of viewers".

Edmonds's career in banking, contrary to his early fears, increased his appreciation by the Art community. "Artists' organizations prized Edmonds' involvement because of his business acumen and his extensive network of contacts with individuals capable of providing significant financial patronage."

== Personal life ==
He married Martha Norman in Hudson, New York in 1831, and had at least one daughter, Nora H. Edmonds.

After about 1854, he devoted much of the remainder of his life to developing a bank-note engraving company, improving his country estate in Bronxville, New York, and raising his large family; he had remarried after returning from Europe.

== Death ==
He died at his residence in Eastchester, New York on the Bronx River on February 7, 1863.

== Selected works ==
List of works by Francis W. Edmonds.

Title	Medium	Date	Collection	Dimensions	Image
The New Bonnet	oil on canvas	1858	Metropolitan Museum of Art	height: 63.5 cm (25 in); width: 76.5 cm (30.1 in)	
Commodore Trunnion and Jack Hatchway, scene from English novel by Tobias Smollett, "The Adventures of Peregrine Pickle".	oil on canvas	c1839	Dallas Museum of Art	64.7 cm (25.5 in); width: 55.8 cm (22 in)	
Courtship in New Amsterdam	oil on canvas	1850	Virginia Museum of Fine Arts	63.82 cm (25 1/8 in); width: 76.36 cm (30 1/16 in)	
