= Chamber of Commerce of the State of New York =

American commercial organization

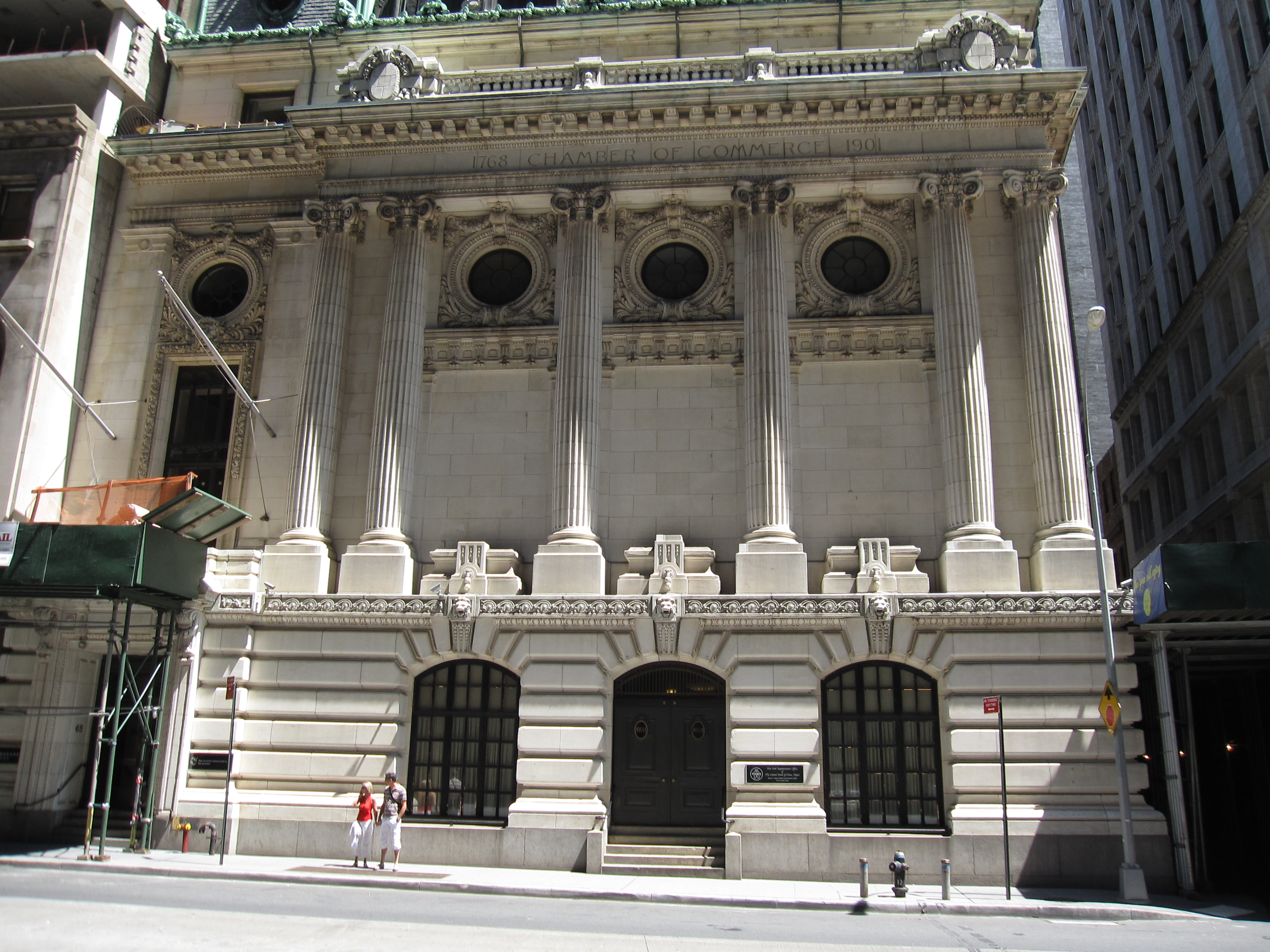
The former Chamber of Commerce Building, located at 65 Liberty Street between Nassau Street and Broadway in Manhattan

The New York Chamber of Commerce was founded in 1768 by twenty New York City merchants. As the first such commercial organization in the United States, it attracted the participation of a number of New York's most influential business leaders, including John Jacob Astor, Peter Cooper, and J. Pierpont Morgan. The chamber's members were instrumental in the realization of several key initiatives in the region – including the Erie Canal, the Atlantic cable, and the New York City Transit Authority. The Chamber of Commerce survives today as the Partnership for New York City, which was formed from the 2002 merger of the New York Chamber of Commerce and Industry and the New York City Partnership.

== History ==
=== 18th century ===
On April 5, 1768, a group of twenty New York merchants met at Bolton and Sigel's Tavern, in the building leased from Samuel Fraunces now known as Fraunces Tavern, to form a mercantile union. Organized under the name the New York Chamber of Commerce, the society was designed to protect and promote the business interests of merchants in New York City. Following its relocation to the Royal Exchange on lower Broad Street in 1770, the Chamber petitioned Lt. Governor Colden and was granted a royal charter from King George III incorporating it as “the Corporation of the Chamber of Commerce in the City of New York in America.”

At the outbreak of the Revolutionary War, the membership was divided into loyalist and patriot factions. Patriot members, including John Cruger, the first President of the Chamber, and William Malcolm left New York City after the British invasion of 1776 while their loyalist counterparts continued to hold meetings and transact business in the city.

After the British evacuation from New York in 1783, the Chamber's returning patriot members quickly established control over the Chamber and relocated to the Merchants’ Coffee House on Wall and Water Streets.

In 1784, the Chamber was issued a new charter reincorporating it as “the Corporation of the Chamber of Commerce of the State of New York,” and over the next few years the Chamber put numerous bills before Congress concerning mercantile issues and the fortification of the New York Harbor. It is during this period that the first mention of the Erie Canal is found. In 1793, the Chamber again relocated; this time to the Tontine Association across the street from the Merchants’ Coffee House. The Chamber was an advocate of the Jay Treaty in 1795 and encouraged other mercantile bodies throughout the country to support it as well. After the turn of the century member participation dropped steadily and by 1806 meetings were suspended due to lack of attendance.

=== 19th century ===
In 1817, the President, Cornelius Ray, called for resumption of Chamber business. New officers were elected and the membership base was increased by 36 during the first meeting. Over the following years interest in the proposed Erie Canal increased and in response to concerns, the Chamber published an informational pamphlet on the Erie Canal's merits.

From 1827 to 1835, the Chamber was housed in the Merchants Exchange Building on Wall Street. That building was destroyed by the Great Fire of New York, on December 16, 1835. During the fire the Chamber's portraits of Alexander Hamilton and Cadwallader Colden were covered with canvas and stored in an attic on Wall Street, where they remained until they were discovered by Prosper Wetmore, Secretary of the Chamber, in 1843. The remaining portraits, books and the Chamber's seal were saved from the fire. There is no record of the original charter's fate and it is believed that the charter perished in the fire. The destruction of the Merchants Exchange Building forced the Chamber to relocate once more, this time to the Merchants Bank, also on Wall Street.

Throughout this period the Chamber was consumed by administrative concerns and the elected officers authorized the hire of an official clerk and librarian to assist the elected Secretary in overseeing the day-to-day functions of the Chamber. The Chamber's membership reached two hundred and five in 1849, and the Chamber became increasingly involved in trade and commerce concerns at the national and international levels, including completion of the first Atlantic cable. In 1858, the Chamber released its first annual report which outlined the condition of mercantile affairs and important changes in business markets connected to the general trade of the country. By this time the Chamber had outgrown its current location and decided that the Underwriters' building on William and Cedar Streets would provide more space for the growing library and membership.

Throughout the Civil War, the Chamber gathered funds and wrote to the President, Congress, the New York State Legislature and the New York City Council regarding the defenses of the New York Harbor. Eventually, the State Legislature allocated one million dollars to the project and after inspection the Chamber deemed these defenses acceptable. The Chamber also commemorated significant events and in 1861 issued medals to the defenders of Fort Sumter and Fort Pickens for their bravery during April and May of that year. Over the course of 1862 and 1863, the Chamber condemned the acts of the CSS Alabama and the CSS Florida, sloops-of-war known for capturing and burning Union merchant and naval ships.

The Chamber estimated the losses suffered from the CSS Alabama at twelve million dollars and wrote to the Secretary of the Navy, Gideon Welles, encouraging him to take immediate action. A year later, on July 7, 1864, the Chamber records that the CSS Alabama was sunk by the sloop-of-war the USS Kearsarge. A committee was appointed to determine the manner in which the Chamber should express its appreciation to the crew of Kearsarge and twenty-five thousand dollars was raised and distributed among them.

=== 20th and 21st centuries ===
The Chamber merged into the New York City Partnership in 2002. It ceased to exist as a standalone organization.

== Presidents ==
Note: All names and dates were taken from the New York Chamber of Commerce Collection, Monthly Bulletin, vol. 40 (1948–49), Rare Book and Manuscript Library, Columbia University.

- John Cruger (1768–1770)
- Hugh Wallace (1770–1771)
- Elias Desbrosses (1771–1772)
- Henry White (1772–1773)
- Theophylact Bache (1773–1774)
- William Walton (1774–1775)
- Isaac Low (1775–1784)
- John Alsop (1784–1785)
- John Broome (1785–1794)
- Comfort Sands (1794–1798)
- John Murray (1798–1806)
- Cornelius Ray (1806–1819)
- William Bayard (1819–1827)
- Robert Lenox (1827–1840)
- Isaac Carow (1840–1842)
- James De Peyster Ogden (1842–1845)
- James G. King (1845–1847)
- Moses H. Grinnell (1847–1848)
- James G. King (1848–1849)
- Moses H. Grinnell (1849–1852)
- Elias Hicks (1852–1853)
- Pelatiah Perit (1853–1863)
- Abiel Abbot Low (1863–1867)
- William E. Dodge (1867–1875)
- Samuel D. Babcock (1875–1882)
- George W. Lane (1882–1883)
- James M. Brown (1884–1887)
- Charles S. Smith (1887–1894)
- Alexander E. Orr (1894–1899)
- Morris K. Jesup (1899–1907)
- J. Edward Simmons (1907–1910)
- A. Barton Hepburn (1910–1912)
- John Claflin (1912–1914)
- Seth Low (1914–1916)
- Eugenius Harvey Outerbridge (1916–1918)
- Alfred Erskine Marling (1918–1920)
- Darwin P. Kingsley (1920–22)
- Irving T. Bush (1922–1924)
- Frederick H. Ecker (1924–1926)
- William L. De Bost (1926–1928)
- Leonor F. Loree (1928–1930)
- J. Barstow Smull (1930–1932)
- James Brown (1932–1934)
- Thomas I. Parkinson (1934–1936)
- Winthrop W. Aldrich (1936–1938)
- Richard W. Lawrence (1938–1940)
- Percy H. Johnston (1940–1942)
- Frederick E. Hasler (1942–1944)
- Leroy A. Lincoln (1944–1946)
- Peter Grimm (1946–1948)
- James G. Blaine (1948–)
