= Augustus D. Juilliard =

American philanthropist (1836–1919)

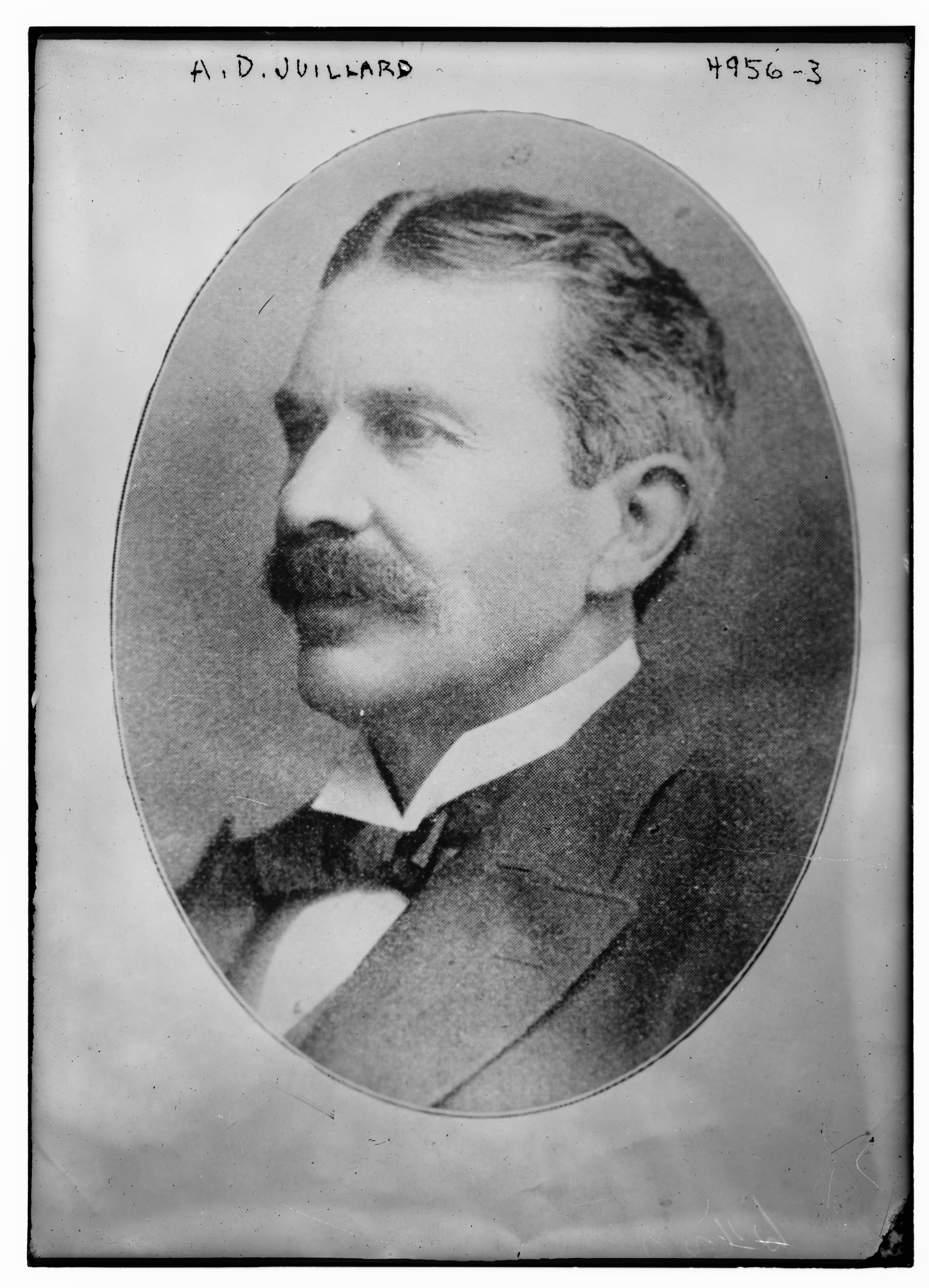
- Born: April 19, 1836; Atlantic Ocean
- Died: April 25, 1919 (aged 83); New York City, New York, U.S.
- Resting place: Woodlawn Cemetery
- Occupations: Businessman, philanthropist
- Spouse: Helen Marcellus Cossitt (m. 1877)
- Parents: Jean Nicolas Juilliard (father); Anna Burlette (mother)

Augustus D. Juilliard (/ˈdʒuːli.ɑːrd/ JOO-lee-ard, French: [ʒɥijaʁ]; April 19, 1836 – April 25, 1919) was an American businessman and philanthropist, born at sea as his parents were emigrating to the United States from France. Making a successful career in New York City, he bequeathed much of his estate to the advancement of music in the United States.

Trustees of his estate set up the Juilliard Foundation in 1920 to accomplish his goals, and in 1924 established the Juilliard School in New York City as a graduate music conservatory. Gradually programs were added in dance and theater.

== Biography ==
The son of immigrants from the Burgundy region of France, Juilliard was born at sea while his parents were en route to the United States. His parents were Jean Nicolas Juilliard, a shoemaker, and Anna Burlette, who were both Protestants. Augustus was raised near Louisville, Ohio, and attended local schools.

In 1866, Juilliard moved to New York City, where he worked in the garment industry for a textile manufacturing company that produced worsted fabrics. When the company went bankrupt seven years later, Juilliard founded his own corporation, the Augustus D. Juilliard Company, in 1874. The corporation distributed textiles including wool, silk, and cotton. In 1884, Juilliard was the plaintiff in the U.S. Supreme Court case Juilliard v. Greenman, challenging the law requiring acceptance of federal reserve notes as legal currency; the challenge failed.

He became a successful and wealthy merchant, who added to his fortune through investments and board appointments in banking, railroad and insurance. He resided in Tuxedo Park, New York, where he owned a grand mansion, and also had an apartment on the West Side of Manhattan. A patron of the Metropolitan Museum of Art and the American Museum of Natural History, he was serving as President of the Metropolitan Opera Real Estate Company at the time of his death. Juilliard died in 1919, aged 83, at his home in New York City. He was interred in the family mausoleum at the Woodlawn Cemetery in the Bronx, New York City.

== Personal life ==
Juilliard married Helen Marcellus Cossitt in 1877. The couple did not have any children. His wife died in 1916.

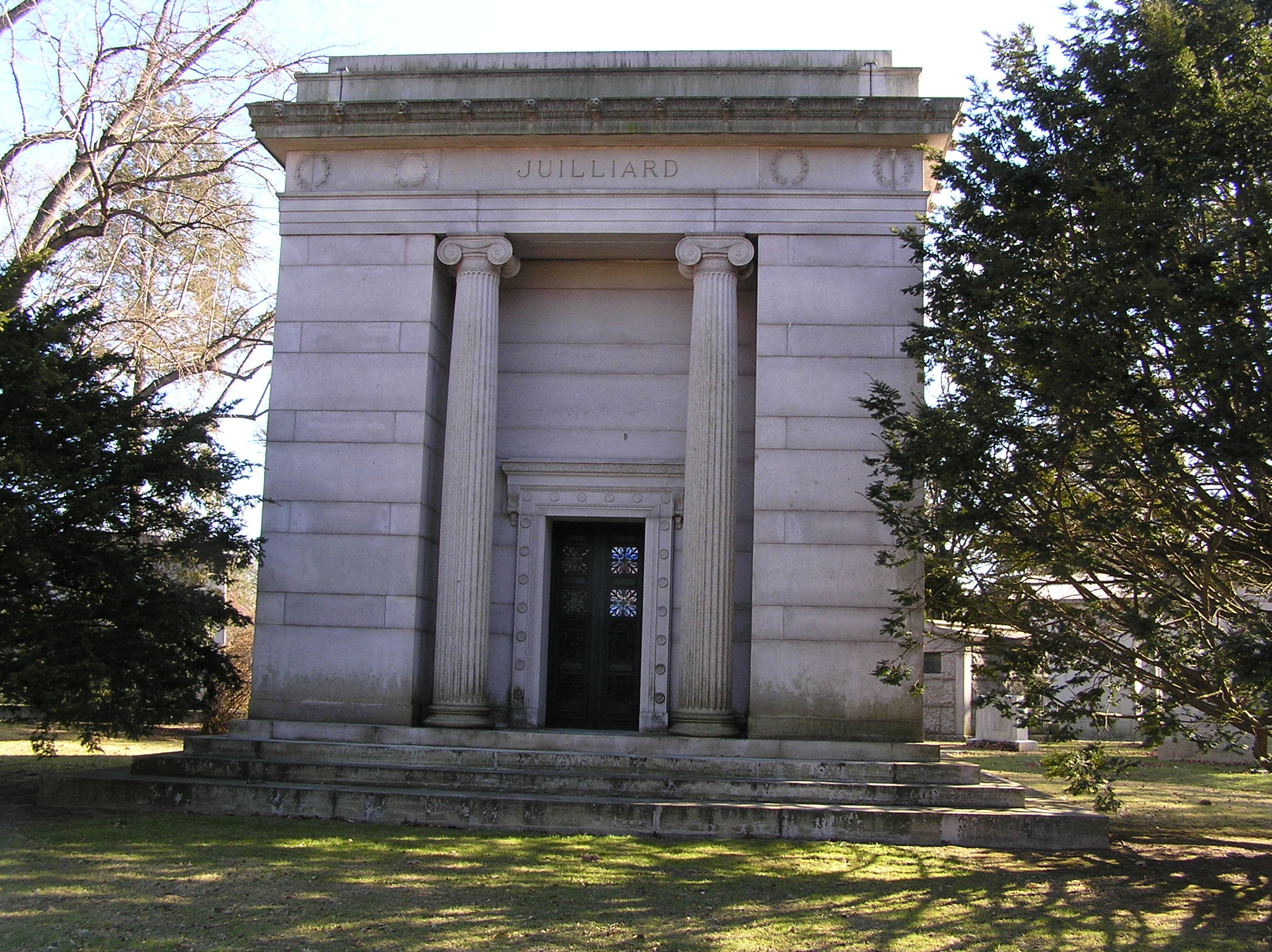
The mausoleum of Augustus. D. Juilliard in Woodlawn Cemetery

== Legacy ==
Juilliard made bequests to hospitals, museums and other charitable causes, but the vast majority of his estate, $5 million (equivalent to $92,900,000 in 2025), was designated for the advancement of music in the United States. In 1920, the Juilliard Foundation was created.

In 1924, the Foundation's funds were used by its Trustees to establish the Juilliard Graduate School to assist excelling students with an advanced music education. In 1926, the school was merged with the New York Institute of Musical Art. This music academy was established in 1905 by Dr. Frank Damrosch (godson of Franz Liszt) and was dedicated to providing a teaching level equaling that of the European conservatories.

== See also ==
- Frederic Augustus Juilliard
