= List of presidents of the Saint Andrew's Society of the State of New York =

The Saint Andrew's Society of the State of New York, founded in 1756, is a charitable organization focused on helping Scots in the New York community.

== History ==
The Society is led by a President, First Vice President, Second Vice President and Managers.

== List of presidents ==
Portrait	No.	Named individual	Start date	End date	Comments
	1	Philip Livingston	1756	1757	Merchant and statesman.
	2	Adam Thomson	1757	1758	A physician.
	3	John Morin Scott	1758	1759	1st Secretary of State of New York.
	4	Andrew Barclay	1759	1761	Uncle of Thomas Henry Barclay.
	5	William Alexander	1761	1764	A Major General during the Revolution.
	6	Alexander Colden	1764	1766	Son of Cadwallader Colden.
	7	Walter Rutherfurd	1766	1767	Also served from 1792-1798.
	8	Peter Middleton	1767	1770	A physician.
	9	John Murray	1770	1771	Governor of the Province of New York.
	10	John Watts	1771	1772	
	11	William McAdam	1772	1773	
	12	Thomas Drummond	1773	1774	Older brother of James Drummond, 1st Baron Perth.
	13	David Johnston	1774	1785	Served two terms: 1774-75 and 1784-85. (Note: The history of the Society from 1774 to 1784, during the Revolutionary War, remains a blank.)
	14	Robert R. Livingston	1785	1792	
	15	Walter Rutherfurd	1792	1798	Also the 7th President.
	16	Robert Lenox	1798	1814	Longest serving president and father of James Lenox
	17	James Tillary	1814	1818	A physician.
	18	Archibald Gracie	1818	1823	
	19	Robert Halliday	1823	1828	
	20	John Graham	1828	1831	
	21	John Johnston	1831	1832	
	22	David Hadden	1832	1835	
	23	Hugh Maxwell	1835	1837	Collector of the Port of New York.
	24	David Hadden	1837	1840	Also 21st president.
	25	David S. Kennedy	1840	1842	
	26	Richard Irvin	1842	1851	
	27	Adam Norrie	1851	1862	
	28	Richard Irvin	1862	1864	Also 24th president.
	29	Robert Gordon	1864	1865	
	30	William Wood	1865	1867	
	31	John Taylor Johnston	1867	1869	President of the Central Railroad of New Jersey.
	32	Robert Gordon	1869	1872	Also the 26th president.
	33	James Moir	1872	1873	
	34	Robert Gordon	1873	1876	Also the 26th president.
	35	James Brand	1876	1879	
	36	John Stewart Kennedy	1879	1882	Financier and philanthropist.
	37	Walter Watson	1882	1884	
	38	John Stewart Kennedy	1884	1887	Also the 31st president.
	39	Bryce Gray	1887	1889	
	40	John Sloane	1889	1893	
	41	George Austin Morrison	1893	1895	
	42	J. Kennedy Tod	1895	1897	
	43	William Lyall	1897	1898	
	44	John Reid	1898	1899	
	45	Andrew Carnegie	1899	1902	
	46	W. Butler Duncan	1902	1906	
	47	Robert Frater Munro	1907	1908	
	48	Alonzo Barton Hepburn	1910	1911	Also Comptroller of the Currency.
	49	George A. Morrison Jr.	1912	1914	Son of the 41st president.
	50	William Sloane	1915	1917	
	51	Alexander C. Humphreys	1918	1920	President of Stevens Institute of Technology
	52	Alexander Walker	1921	1921	A banker.
	53	Alexander B. Halliday	1922	1923	Son-in-law of 38th president.
	54	John Sloane Jr.	1924	1925	
	55	Henry Moir	1926	1927	President of the United States Life Insurance Company
	56	Charles P. McClelland	1928	1929	Chief Justice of the United States Customs Court
	57	George McGeachin	1930	1931	Mayor of Larchmont, New York
	58	James Sears McCulloh	1932	1934	President of New York Telephone Company.
	59	Andrew Baxter	1935	1936	
	60	Maitland Dwight	1937	1938	A lawyer
	61	Arthur Hunter	1938	1940	An actuary
	62	William W. Peake	1941	1942	A stockbroker
	63	Henry Jessup Cochran	1943	1944	President of the Bankers Trust
	64	Errol Kerr	1945	1942	An accountant
	65	Benjamin P. Watson	1946	1947	A physician
	66	Ward Melville	1948	1949	His father was a nephew of sculptor John Quincy Adams Ward.
	67	Duncan M. Spencer	1950	1951	Chairman of the Fiduciary Trust Company.
	68	James A. Keillor	1952	1953	Vice-president of B. Altman & Co.
	69	John M. MacGregor	1954	1955	
	70	Thomas P. Haig	1956	1957	A minister
	71	David Bowie McVean	1958	1959	President of the Bay Ridge Savings Bank
	72	Hugh Seel MacLean	1960	1961	Associated with Imperial Chemical Industries.
	73	Allan C. George	1962	1963	An accountant
	74	Henry J. Cochran Jr.	1964	1965	Son of the 63rd president
	75	Everett M. Clark	1966	1967	
	76	Nestor J. MacDonald	1968	1969	President of Thomas & Betts
	77	J. Sinclair Armstrong	1970	1971	Chairman of the U.S. Securities and Exchange Commission
	78	Donald Gregg	1971	1973	President of Faber, Coe & Gregg.
	79	David P. H. Watson	1973	1975	Son of the 65th President.
	80	Gordon L. Barclay	1975	1977	Managing director of the Research Foundation for Mental Hygiene
	81	Douglas Lachlan Maclean	1978	1979	A minister.
	82	John A. Fraser	1979	1981	
	83	John L. Coulson	1981	1982	
	84	Robert Campbell Jr.	1983	1985	
	85	David Graham Black Jr.	1985	1987	
	86	Robert F. Colquhoun	1987	1989	Of Clan Colquhoun.
	87	Geoffrey Gregg	1989	1991	
	88	Steven M. Draper	1991	1993	
	89	Robert Coe	1993	1995	
	90	Victor E. Stewart	1995	1997	
	91	Sean Stewart Macpherson	1997	1999	
	92	Roderick Errol Kerr Jr.	1999	2001	
	93	John Mauk Hilliard	2001	2003	
	94	Edward J. Collins Jr.	2003	2005	
	95	Duncan Archibald Bruce	2005	2007	
	96	Alfred G. Bisset	2007	2009	
	97	Robert W. Ker III	2009	2011	
	98	William T. Maitland	2011	2012	
	99	Samuel F. Abernethy Esq	2012	2014	
	100	Thomas D. Halket	2014	2016	
	101	James Heggie III	2016	2018	
	102	Donald Sinclair Whamond Jr.	2018	2020	
	103	David M. Murphy	2020	2022	
	104	Richard Porter	2022		
