= George Morrison =

George Morrison or Morison may refer to:

== Politics and government ==
- George W. Morrison (1809–1888), U.S. Representative from New Hampshire
- George S. Morrison (diplomat) (1830–1893), British diplomat
- George Ernest Morrison (1862–1920), Australian journalist and political adviser to China's first president
- George Morrison (British politician) (1869–1956), Liberal (then National Liberal) Member of Parliament for the Combined Scottish Universities, 1934–45
- George M. Morrison (1902–?), lawyer and political figure in Nova Scotia, Canada
- George Morrison (Northern Ireland politician) (1924–2014), member of the Vanguard Progressive Unionist Party

== Military ==
- George Morrison (British Army officer) (1703–1799), Quartermaster-General to the Forces
- George Stephen Morrison (1919–2008), American Navy officer and father of musician Jim Morrison

== Arts and entertainment ==
- George Pitt Morison (1861–1946), Australian painter and engraver
- Pete Morrison (George D. Morrison, 1890–1973), silent film actor
- George Morrison (artist) (1919–2000), American artist
- George Morrison (documentary maker) (1922–2025), Irish filmmaker
- George Morrison (acting teacher) (1928–2014), American acting teacher and director
- Van Morrison (George Ivan Morrison, born 1945), Northern Irish singer-songwriter and musician

== Sports ==
- George Morrison (Australian footballer) (1873–1942), Australian rules footballer
- George Morrison (footballer, born 2005)
- George Morrison (cricketer) (1915–1993), Irish cricketer and artist
- George Morrison (ice hockey) (1948–2008), National Hockey League player

== Other ==
- George S. Morison (1842–1903), American engineer and bridge designer
- George F. Morrison (1867–1943), American electric executive
- George Austin Morrison, Scottish-American merchant, banker and industrialist

== See also ==
- George Morrison Reid Henry (1891–1983), Sri Lankan entomologist and ornithologist
