= David B. McVean =

Scottish banker (1903-1959)

David Bowie McVean (February 27, 1903 – December 19, 1959) was a Scottish-American banker who served as president of the Bay Ridge Savings Bank.

== Early life ==
McVean was born in Leith, Scotland on February 27, 1903. In Scotland, he studied at Heriot-Watt College. He moved to Canada in 1919 where he began his banking career. On September 12, 1922, he was promoted to provisional Lieutenant with the Elgin Regiment, a regiment of the Canadian Armed Forces.

== Career ==
In 1943, during World War II, McVean came to the United States and joined the Bay Ridge Savings Bank (Bay Ridge was acquired by Independence Savings Bank in 1996) as assistant vice president. He later became a U.S. citizen. In March 1947, he was promoted to executive vice president of the bank and made a member of its board of trustees, three months before he was elected to succeed Robert S. Darbee as president of the bank in June 1947. At the time of his elevation to the presidency, the "bank reported more than 100,000 depositors and resources exceeding $100,000,000." He was considered an expert on Brooklyn real estate, and he lived at 105 East 82nd Street. McVean also served as secretary to the Investment Officers Association of Savings Banks of the State of New York.

From 1958 to 1959, McVean served as the 71st president of the Saint Andrew's Society of the State of New York, a group founded in 1756 that supported Scots in New York.

== Personal life ==
On December 23, 1931, McVean was married to Edna Rutherford, with whom he had a son, Donald McVean. Edna was a daughter of James Albert Rutherford of Potsdam, New York, a farmer and merchant. David was known for his "ready sense of humor and a delightful wit."

McVean died from a heart attack on December 19, 1959 at age 56.
