= John Reid (businessman) =

Scottish-American businessman

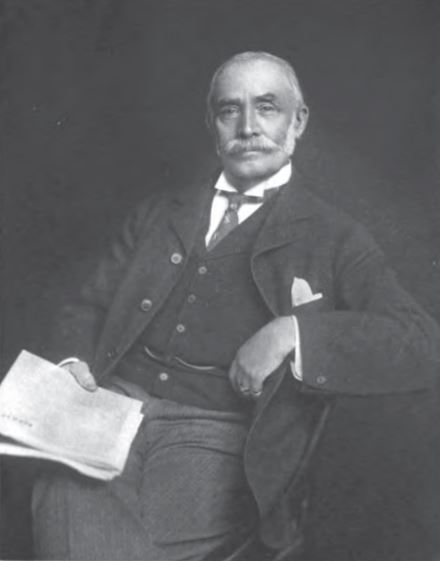

38th President of the Saint Andrew's Society of the State of New York
- In office 1898–1899
- Preceded by: William Lyall
- Succeeded by: Andrew Carnegie

Personal details
- Born: October 14, 1840 Dunfermline, Scotland
- Died: October 7, 1916 (aged 75) Yonkers, New York, U.S.
- Resting place: Woodlawn Cemetery
- Spouse: Lizzie Mudge (m. 1873)
- Children: 5
- Profession: General Manager of J. L. Mott Iron Works

John Reid (October 14, 1840 – October 7, 1916) was a Scottish-American businessman who has been called "The Father of Golf" in the United States.

== Early life ==
Reid was born on October 14, 1840, in Dunfermline, Scotland. He was the son of Helen (née Arnot) Reid and Andrew Reid and received his early education in Scotland.

== Career ==
In 1866, Reid emigrated to the United States, and within a few months of his arrival, began working for J. L. Mott Iron Works, which was founded by Jordan L. Mott in 1828. Reid was eventually promoted to General Manager, which he held for thirty-nine years. He also served as a trustee of the J. L. Mott Iron Works and a director of the Central Foundry Company, the Central Iron & Coal Company and the Trenton Fire Clay & Porcelain Company. Upon Jordan L. Mott Jr.'s death in 1915, Reid served as executor of his estate.

He was a member of the Engineers' Club, the Fulton Club, the Society of British Schools and Universities and the Burns Society. He was also elected a member of the Saint Andrew's Society of the State of New York, of which he served as the 38th President from 1898 to 1899, when he was succeeded by Andrew Carnegie as president.

=== Interest in golf ===
Around 1887, he introduced and played the "Royal Scottish Game" on an improvised course near his home and was the leader of the Apple Tree Gang. On November 14, 1888, at a dinner at his house, he founded and, served as the first president of Saint Andrew's Golf Club located in Hastings-on-Hudson, New York. Reid's portrait by Frank Fowler hangs in the dining room. Today, the club is the oldest golf club in the United States.

== Personal life ==
On October 28, 1873, Reid was married to Elizabeth Eddy "Lizzie" Mudge (1854–1925) at Volcano, Virginia. Lizzie was the daughter of Daniel C. Mudge and Ellen (née Carr) Mudge. Together, they resided at 408 Palisades Avenue in Yonkers and were the parents of:

- Andrew Reid (1874–1876), who died in infancy.
- Ellen M. Reid (1876–1962), who married lawyer Alexander Brown Halliday in 1899.
- John Reid Jr. (1878–1925), also a golfer, who helped found the Yale University Golf Club in 1896. He married Jeanette Bull.
- Jean Arnot Reid (1882–1955), a painter.
- Archibald M. Reid (1884–1967), who was a member of the 1902 Yale intercollegiate champion team and captain in 1904. He was a partner in Carlisle & Jacquelin, and a former president of the United States Golf Association.

After a lingering illness, Reid died on October 7, 1916, at his residence in Yonkers, New York.
