= William Lyall (businessman) =

Scottish–American merchant

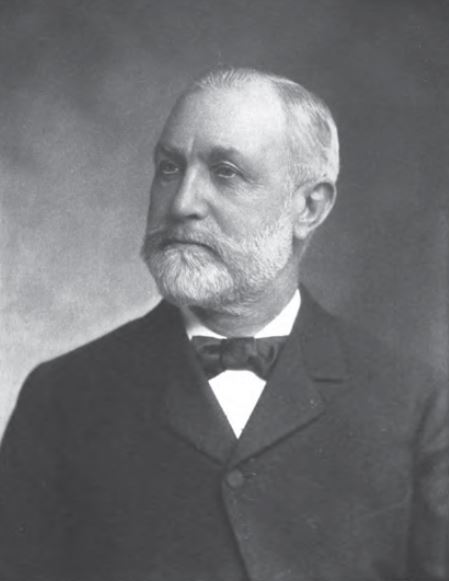

37th President of the Saint Andrew's Society of the State of New York
- In office 1897–1898
- Preceded by: John Kennedy Tod
- Succeeded by: John Reid

Personal details
- Born: William Butler Duncan; October 20, 1840; Jersey City, New Jersey, U.S.
- Died: January 13, 1916 (aged 75); New York City, U.S.
- Resting place: Green-Wood Cemetery
- Occupation: Businessman, financier

William Lyall (October 20, 1840 – January 13, 1916) was a Scottish–American merchant and businessman.

== Early life ==
Lyall was born on October 20, 1840. He was the son of the former Mary Cooper, a native of Perth, Scotland, and Charles Lyall, a native of Dunfermline, Scotland who emigrated to the United States in 1840. His elder brother James Lyall was born an Auchterarder, Scotland in 1836.

== Career ==
After "youthful studies in the New York schools," Lyall became a member of various mercantile firms, including the Planet Mills, the United States Corset Company, and the Chelsea Jute Mills Company. Along with his brother, inventor James Lyall, he established the J. & W. Lyall Loom and Machine Works, which manufactured textile machinery. Their loom was awarded the first Great Gold Medal of Honor and several awards from the Centennial Exposition of 1876.

For many years, Lyall was president of the Brighton Mills in Passaic, New Jersey, until his retirement c. 1906, as well as a director of several banks and fire insurance companies.

He was a member of the Union League Club, the New York City Chamber of Commerce, and was elected a member of the Saint Andrew's Society of the State of New York, of which he served as the 37th President from 1897 to 1898.

== Personal life ==
On June 26, 1862, he was married to Kittie Earl in New York City. Kittie was the daughter of Tarleton B. Earl and Mary (née McCollough) Earl. Together, they were the parents of:

- William Lord Lyall (1863–1937), a mechanical engineer. He married Cecelia Lambert and was later chairman of Brighton Mills.
- Charles Emile Lyall (1865–1940), who married Edith Beaumont Drummond in 1894. He was also married to Alice Pomeroy.
- Herbert James Lyall (1869–1941), a lawyer who served as president of the Mutual Investment Company.
- Kitty Earl Lyall (1871–1950)
- Earl Harvey Lyall (1877–1932), an architect and artist.

After his first wife's death, Lyall remarried to Pamelia Washborn (née Warren) Oxnard (1844–1929) on April 25, 1882, in New York City. Pamelia, the widow of Clarence Oxnard, was the daughter of George H. Warren and Jane (née Hammond) Warren. Together, they were the parents of:

- Pamelia Warren Lyall (1884–1971)

After his retirement, Lyall moved to Summit, New Jersey. Lyall knew President Abraham Lincoln and was a close friend of both Andrew Carnegie and President William McKinley.

Lyall died suddenly on January 13, 1916, at the Hudson tunnel platform at 18th Street and Sixth Avenue. After a funeral held at his home, 41 Prospect Street in Summit, he was buried at Green-Wood Cemetery in Brooklyn.
