= John Moir (physician) =

Dr. John Moir FRSE

President of the Royal College of Physicians of Edinburgh
- In office 1867–1869
- Preceded by: Andrew Halliday Douglas
- Succeeded by: John Smith

Personal details
- Born: John Innes Allan Moir; 6 April 1808; Verdun, France
- Died: 14 May 1899 (aged 91); Edinburgh's New Town
- Spouse: Margaret Louisa Heriot Maitland (m. 1845)
- Relations: James Moir (brother)
- Children: 3
- Education: Royal High School; University of Edinburgh

Dr. John Innes Allan Moir FRSE (6 April 1808 – 14 May 1899) was a 19th-century Scottish physician and obstetrician who held multiple senior positions within the Scottish medical world.

== Early life ==
Moir was born with the grounds of the military prison at Verdun in France on 6 April 1808 the son of Margaret Laing Stenhouse and Dr James Moir (b.1780), a naval surgeon in the Royal Navy, who was captured by the French when his ship sank in the Channel around 1806. While in prison Moir was allowed to be joined by his wife, hence his birth occurring in prison. Among his younger brothers was James Moir, a merchant who moved to America in 1836.

From around 1815 (after the end of the wars), he lived with his family at 21 Blair Street in Edinburgh's Old Town.

== Education and career ==
He attended the High School in Edinburgh, at that time only a short distance from his home. He studied medicine at the University of Edinburgh gaining his doctorate (MD) in 1828.

In 1849 he was elected a member of the Harveian Society of Edinburgh. In 1865 he was elected a Fellow of the Royal Society of Edinburgh his proposer being John Hutton Balfour.

From 1858 to 1859, he served as president of the Obstetrical Society. From 1865 to 1867, he served as president of the Medico-Chirurgical Society, and from 1867 to 1869, he served as president of the Royal College of Physicians of Edinburgh.

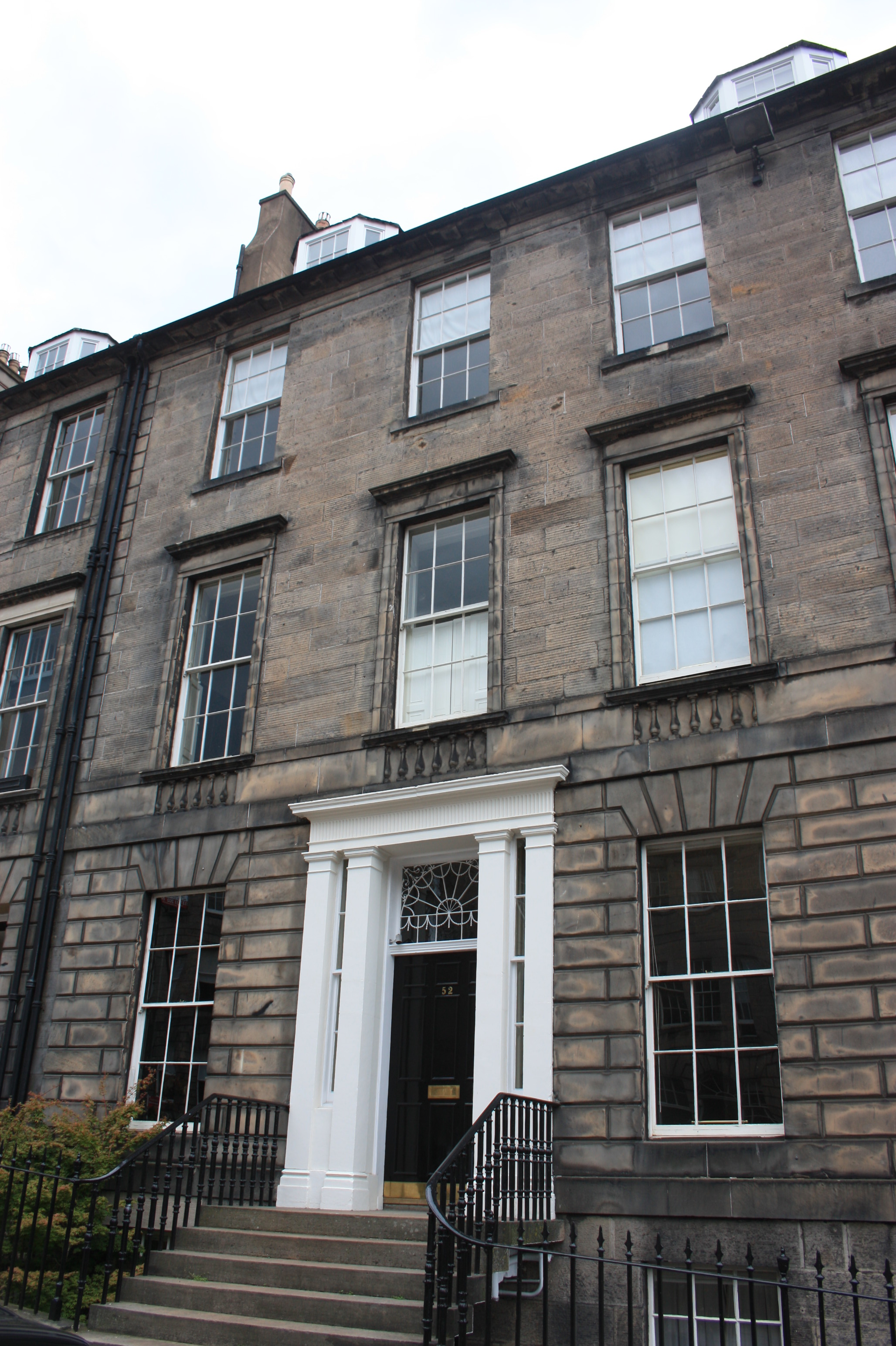
52 North Castle Street, Edinburgh

== Personal life ==
In 1845, he married Margaret Louisa Heriot Maitland (1820–1905) in Kettle, Fife. Margaret was the daughter of Margaret (née Dalgleish) Maitland-Heriot and James Maitland-Heriot of Ramornie, a grandson of Charles Maitland, 6th Earl of Lauderdale and Lady Elizabeth Ogilvy (daughter of James Ogilvy, 4th Earl of Findlater). They had two sons:

- Margaret Louisa Moir (b. 1849)
- John William Moir (1851–1940), a trader in Africa who married Helen Elizabeth Tod.
- Frederick Lewis Maitland Moir (1852–1939), who married Jane Fordyce Beith in 1885.

He died at home, 52 Castle Street (now known as North Castle St) in Edinburgh's New Town on 14 May 1899. He is buried in New Calton Cemetery.

=== Descendants ===
Their grandchildren included Henry Maitland Moir and Margaret Louisa Maitland Moir. He was great grandfather of Father John Maitland Moir.

Academic offices
Preceded by Andrew Halliday Douglas	President of the Royal College of Physicians of Edinburgh; 1867–1869	Succeeded by John Smith
