= James Brand =

James Brand may refer to:

- James T. Brand (1886–1964), judge in Oregon
- James Brand (musician) (1976–2010), American musician
- James Brand (merchant) (1822–1897), Scottish-American merchant
- James Brande, MP for Old Sarum
