= Royal Society of St George =

English patriotic society

The Royal Society of Saint George
- Abbreviation: RSSG (formerly RSStG)
- Formation: 1894
- Type: Patriotic society
- Headquarters: P.O. BOX 388, Broadstairs, Kent, CT10 9DZ, England
- Patron: King Charles III
- Chairman: Dr Chris Houghton
- Website: rssg.org.uk

The Royal Society of St George is an English patriotic society established in 1894 to encourage interest in the English way of life, and English history, ideals, customs and traditions. It has branches in various parts of the world.

== History ==
In 1348, St George became the Patron Saint of England after Edward III founded the Order of the Garter, under George's patronage. English soldiers fighting under the command of King Henry V defeated the French at the Battle of Agincourt in 1415. In his history play Henry V, William Shakespeare has Henry conclude his famous battle speech with the rallying cry "Cry God for Harry, England and St. George!" (Act 3.1) Ever since the English victory, St George has been the patriotic rallying point for the English people.

The Royal Society of St George was founded in 1894 by farmer Howard Ruff with the object of promoting "Englishness" and the English way of life. Ruff served as the society's first Honorary Secretary. In 1900 he gave up farming to devote his time exclusively to the society.

The society quickly attracted the support of many public figures in England and throughout the then British Empire. Its first Royal Patron was Queen Victoria; and the society has enjoyed the Patronage of every reigning monarch up to the incumbent King Charles III.

In 1963 the Queen granted the society its own Royal Charter. The society was further granted Arms in 1990.

Before the formation of The Royal Society of St George, Societies of St George had been founded in the then North American Colonies for the relief of British immigrants and to give them general assistance in the new country. The earliest Branches of which there are any records are those of New York (1770), Philadelphia (1772) and Charlestown (1773). Subsequently, branches were formed in all the great cities of the North American continent and celebrations were always held on St George's Day. At the time of the War of Independence many loyalists moved to Canada and founded similar societies in Halifax (1786) and other cities.

== The society's objects ==
The objects that are specified in the terms of its Royal Charter are:

- To foster the love of England and to strengthen England and the Commonwealth by spreading the knowledge of English history, traditions, and ideals.
- To keep fresh the memory of those in all walks of life, who have served England or the Commonwealth in the past, to inspire leadership in the future.
- To combat all activities to undermine the strength of England or the Commonwealth.
- To further English interest everywhere to ensure that St George's Day is properly celebrated and to provide focal points all the world over where English men and women may gather together.

== Charitable causes ==
The society has its own charitable trust, which is run separately from the society and is governed by a board of trustees.

The objectives of the charity are to:

- Help and encourage young people to greater achievement in England and the Commonwealth
- Encourage the enterprise, skills and enthusiasm of young people through support of appropriate organisations

== Membership criteria ==
The society is fully inclusive and independent of party politics and membership is open to all those who subscribe to the objects of the society.

Their current membership is made up of a network of branches throughout England and the world, as well as a large number of direct society members. The international confraternity, the Order of St George, is affiliated with the society.

Certain branches of the Royal Society of St George, such as the California branch, bestow Honorary Membership upon "individuals of eminence" who have made notable contributions to the Royal Society of St George, in addition to being accomplished professionally.

== Former presidents and vice presidents ==
The list below includes some of the notable people who have served as either president or vice-president of the society:

- Prince George, Duke of Cambridge
- The Prince of Wales (later Edward VIII then Duke of Windsor)
- Field Marshal Bernard Montgomery, 1st Viscount Montgomery of Alamein
- Edward Cavendish, 10th Duke of Devonshire
- Sir Winston Churchill
- Gerald Grosvenor, 6th Duke of Westminster
- Peter Nelson, 9th Earl Nelson
- Charles Forte, Baron Forte
- Field Marshal Edwin Bramall, Baron Bramall

== See also ==
- St. George Society of Philadelphia
- St. George's Society of Baltimore
- The United Empire Loyalists' Association of Canada
