= Robert Halliday =

Robert Halliday may refer to:

- Robert Halliday (bishop) (1932–2025), bishop of Brechin
- Robert Halliday (footballer) (born 1986), Scottish football defender
- Robert Halliday (businessman) (c. 1770–1840), Scottish-American businessman

== See also ==
- Robert Halliday Gunning (1818–1900), Scottish surgeon, entrepreneur and philanthropist.
- Robert Holliday (1933–2014), American politician.
- Robert Cortes Holliday (1880–1947), American writer and literary editor
