= Bryce Gray =

Scottish-American merchant and banker (1827 – 1897)

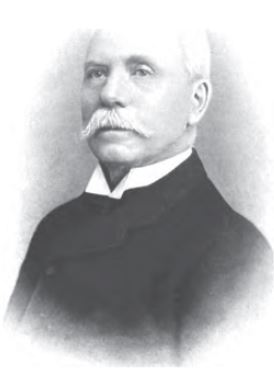

President of the Saint Andrew's Society of the State of New York
- In office 1887–1889
- Preceded by: John Stewart Kennedy
- Succeeded by: John Sloane

Personal details
- Born: January 1, 1827 Glasgow, Scotland
- Died: June 27, 1897 (aged 69–70) New York City, New York, U.S.
- Spouse: Andrewetta Josephine Mount (m. 1860)
- Children: 3
- Parent(s): Robert Gray; Margaret Cherry Gray

Bryce Gray (November 27, 1827 – June 29, 1897) was a Scottish-American merchant and banker who served as the president of the Saint Andrew's Society of the State of New York.

== Early life ==
Gray was born in Glasgow, Scotland on November 27, 1827. He was a son of Robert Gray and Margaret Cherry Gray.

== Career ==
In 1843, at the age of fourteen, he left Scotland to begin working for his cousins' (William and James Murdoch) firm, Murdoch Brothers in Halifax, Nova Scotia, the largest dry goods merchants in the area. Around 1850, he came to New York City to become cashier, or head bookkeeper, of White & Thurger. After Thurger died, the firm was reorganized under the name James F. White & Co. on Pine Street. White retired in 1855 to move to Dundee and Gray became the senior member of the firm until his death in 1897. He also served as a director of the Commonwealth Insurance Company of New York, president of the Aztec Land and Cattle Company, and a director of the Atlantic and Pacific and St. Louis–San Francisco Railways.

Gordon was a member of the New York City Chamber of Commerce the Saint Andrew's Society of the State of New York where he served as president from 1887 to 1889.

== Personal life ==
On May 31, 1860, he married Andrewetta Josephine Mount (1838–1919), daughter of Jane C. K. B. (née Perry) Mount and Andrew Mount of Wilmerding & Mount. Together, they were the parents of three children:

- Bryce Gray Jr. (1861–1900), who married Ada Gwynne, daughter of Nicholas Gwynne.
- George Mount Gray (1863–1929), who was also a member of James F. White & Co.
- Josephine Gray (1868–1928), who married Charles Henry Jewett (1869–1934).

At one time, he owned a large tract of land in the Highlands and the draw bridge across the Shrewsbury River before it came into possession of the county.

Gray died on June 29, 1897, at his home, 554 Fifth Avenue in New York City. He was buried at All Saints Memorial Church Cemetery in Navesink, New Jersey.
