= Saint Andrew's Golf Club (New York) =

Golf club in New York, United States

Coordinates: 40°59′37.1″N 73°50′55.1″W

- Interactive map of Saint Andrew's Golf Club

Club information
- Location: Hastings-on-Hudson, New York
- Established: 1888
- Total holes: 18
- Website: www.saintandrewsgolfclub.com
- Designed by: William H. Tucker & Harry Tallmadge; Jack Nicklaus redesign (1983)
- Par: 71

The Saint Andrew's Golf Club is a private golf club located in Hastings-on-Hudson, Westchester County, New York, United States. It is the oldest continuously operating golf club in the United States. In 1894, the club was one of five founding members of the United States Golf Association.

== History ==
Founded in 1888 by John Reid of Dunfermline, Scotland, the club is the oldest golf club in the United States. The club crest features a Scottish saltire.

In 1900, American Charles E. Sands, representative of Saint Andrew's Golf Club, won the men's individual gold medal at 1900 Paris Summer Olympic Games in Paris, France.

The current site, the club's home since 1897, features an 18-hole golf course designed by golf course architects William H. Tucker and Harry Tallmadge. In 1983, the course was refurbished by legendary golfer Jack Nicklaus.

=== United States Golf Association ===
Along with fellow Empire State club Shinnecock Hills Golf Club, Illinois's Chicago Golf Club, Rhode Island's Newport Country Club and Massachusetts's The Country Club, Saint Andrew's Golf Club was, in 1894, one of the five founding members of the United States Golf Association, one of the sport's two major governing bodies.

== In popular culture ==
Andrew Carnegie, a prominent member of Saint Andrew's Golf Club, maintained a summer cottage at the club. During a round of golf with Charles M. Schwab, Carnegie agreed to sell Carnegie Steel Company to J.P. Morgan's U.S Steel. Golf Digest noted it as "the biggest deal ever hatched on a golf course."

Following the 1988 US Open, Saint Andrew's Golf Club hosted a centennial celebration, commemorating 100 years of golf in the United States. The celebration was attended by Arnold Palmer, Sam Snead, Gene Sazaren, Ben Hogan, Gary Player and Jack Nicklaus.

The involvement of golf architect Donald Ross in Saint Andrew's early history had been a subject of controversy throughout the 20th century. In 2023, The Donald Ross Society confirmed the role of Donald Ross in a 1914-1917 redesign of then holes 10-14 at Saint Andrew's. The fairway lines of Donald Ross' holes 12, 13, 14 remained today, unaltered by Jack Nicklaus' 1983 redesign.
