= John Smith (physician) =

Scottish physician

Dr John C. Douglas Smith FRSE PRCPE (c.1800–4 February 1879) was a 19th-century Scottish physician specialising in treating the insane, who served as President of the Royal College of Physicians of Edinburgh from 1865 to 1867.

== Life ==
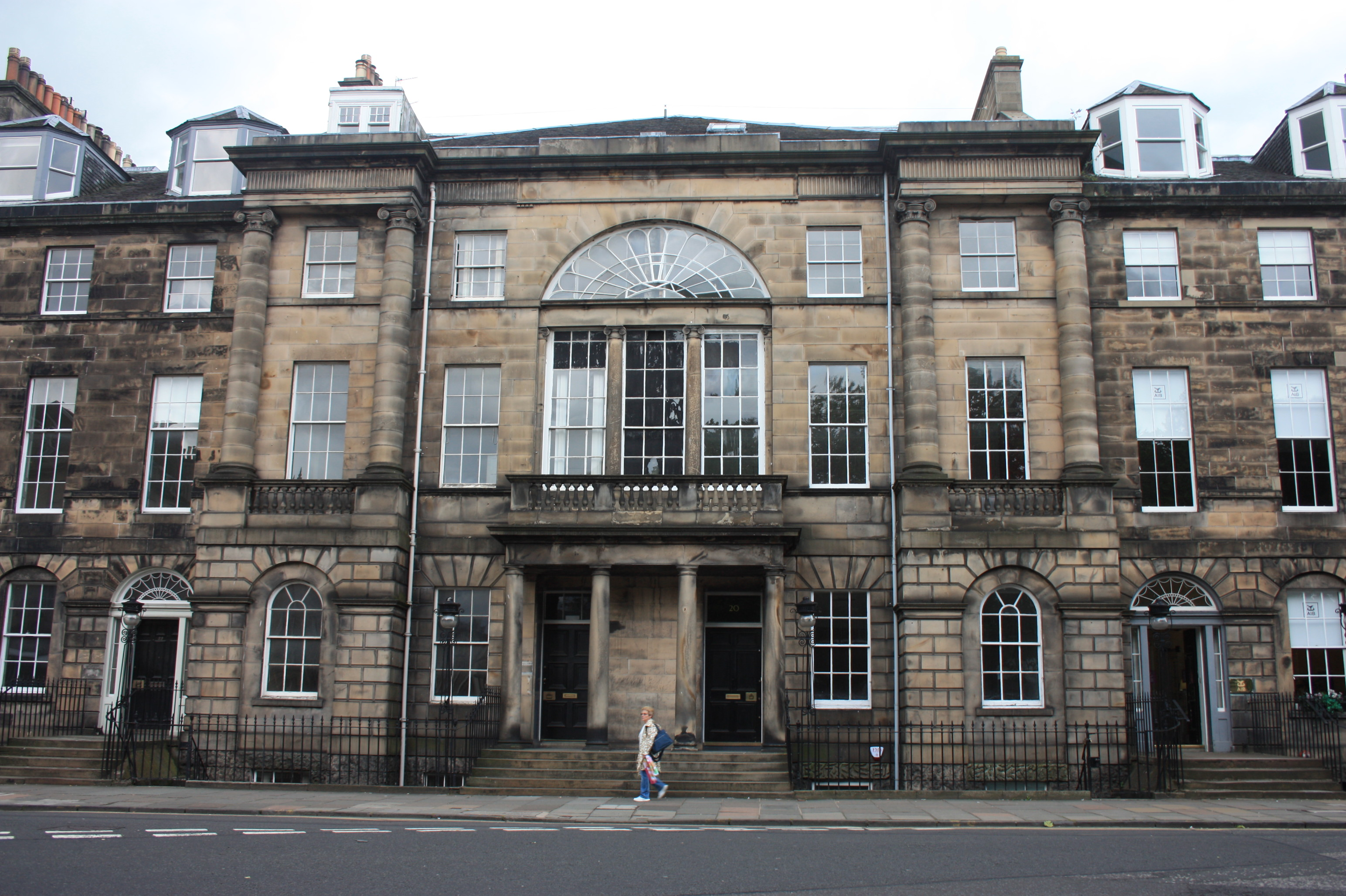
20 Charlotte Square (right)

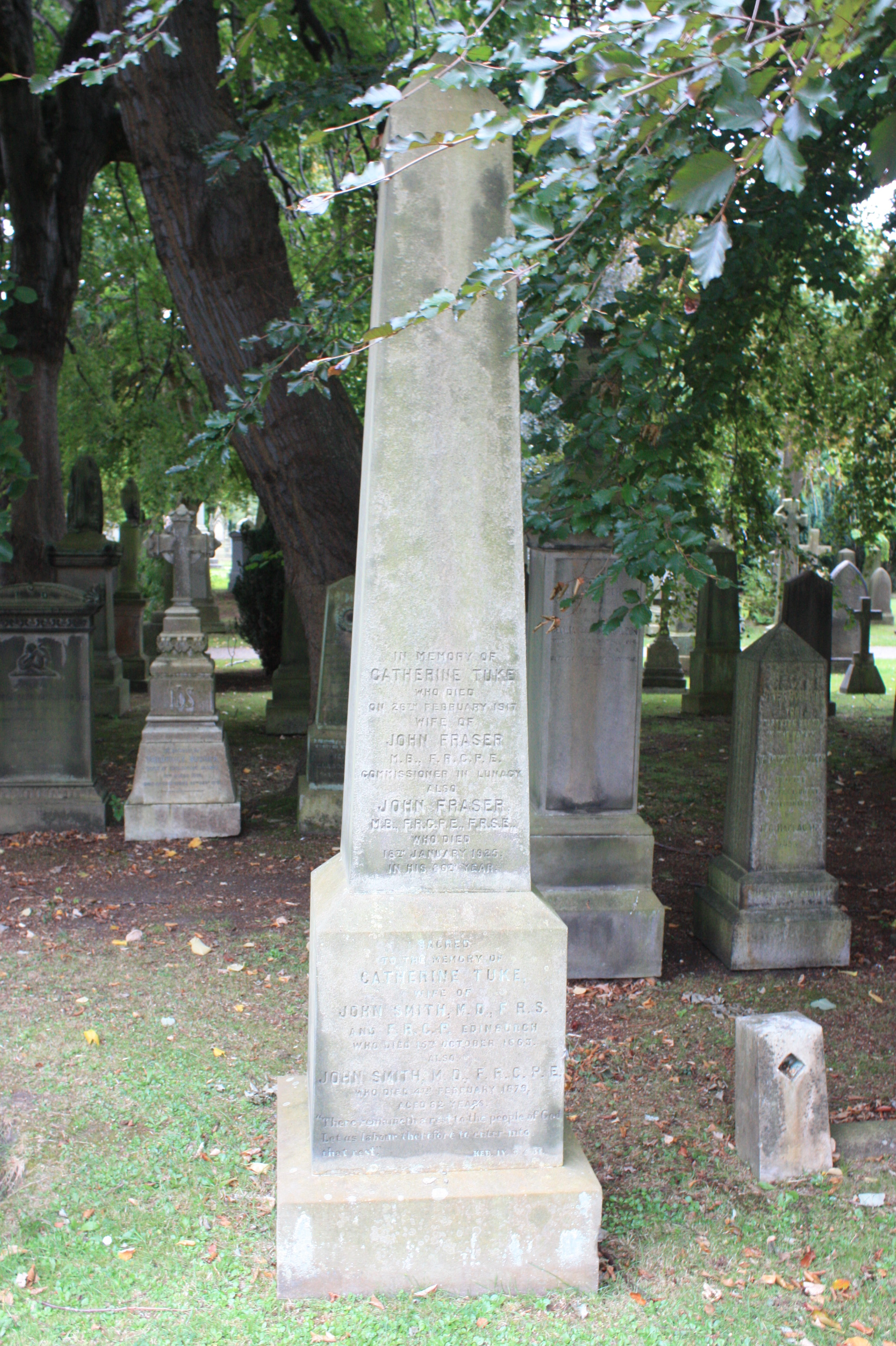
The grave of Dr John Smith FRSE, Dean Cemetery

He was born in Edinburgh around 1800 and educated at George Heriot's School.

He was apprenticed to George Wood surgeon at 28 Queen Street. He then studied medicine at the University of Edinburgh gaining his doctorate (MD) in 1822.

He worked variously at the Saughton Hall Asylum for the Insane (created in 1824), the Edinburgh Charity Workhouse and the Bedlam Asylum on Forest Road.

He was elected a Fellow of the Royal College of Physicians of Edinburgh in 1833. In 1834 Smith was elected a member of the Harveian Society of Edinburgh and served as President in 1850. In 1838 he was elected a member of the Aesculapian Club. In 1865 he was elected President of the Royal College of Physicians of Edinburgh in succession to Dr John Moir. At this time he was living at 20 Charlotte Square.

In 1866 he was elected a Fellow of the Royal Society of Edinburgh his proposer being John Hutton Balfour.

In 1867 he succeeded in his presidential role by John Graham MacDonald Burt.

He appears to have retired around 1870, and from then is no longer recorded in Edinburgh Post Office Directories.

He died on 4 February 1879, and is buried in Dean Cemetery in western Edinburgh. The grave lies towards the west in one of the north-west sections.

== Family ==
He was married to Catherine Tuke (d.1863), sister of John Batty Tuke.
