= George Austin Morrison =

American businessman

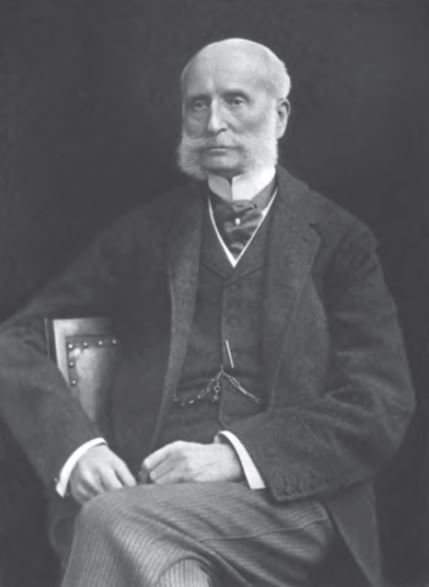

President of the Saint Andrew's Society of the State of New York
- In office 1893–1895
- Preceded by: John W. Sloane
- Succeeded by: John Kennedy Tod

Personal details
- Born: November 30, 1832 Fordoun, Aberdeenshire, Scotland
- Died: February 26, 1916 (aged 83) New York City, New York, U.S.
- Spouse: Lucy Anne King (m. 1863; died 1891)
- Children: George Austin Morrison Jr. Charles King Morrison
- Parent(s): Alexander Morrison; Christian Lyall Morrison
- Education: Aberdeen Grammar School
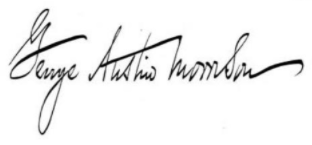
- Signature

George Austin Morrison (November 30, 1832 – February 26, 1916) was an American merchant, banker and industrialist.

== Early life ==
Morrison was born on November 30, 1832, at Mondynes in the parish of Fordoun, Aberdeenshire, Scotland. He was a son of Alexander Morrison and Christian (née Lyall) Morrison, a relative of the Lyalls, Austins and Burns, all "old and well-established Aberdeenshire families".

Morrison first attended the parish school at Fourdon, then Aberdeen Grammar School, before being sent to reside with his maternal uncle, George Lyall, at age sixteen. Lyall was a general merchant in Aberdeen with a branch of his business at Montego Bay in Jamaica.

== Career ==
After learning the merchant business in the house of his uncle, he left his uncles home, 99 Union Street, Aberdeen, and went to London in 1852 and joined George Moore's firm, Groucock, Copestake, Moore & Co., one of the leading mercantile houses, which was located in Bow Yard, London. Morrison stayed with the firm until 1856 when he moved to New York City to become the head of one of the departments in Cochran & Company, a wholesale dry gods house, led by Thomas Cochrane.

In New York, he was the European buyer for the firm, crossing the Atlantic Ocean twice a year (over 110 times), and was admitted as a partner in 1865. In 1869, when the firm was reorganized as Cochrane, McLean & Co., he left and started his own firm with John Herriman, known as Morrison, Herriman & Co. George was involved in the new house, which was a wholesale dry goods business including lace, linen and white goods, for twenty years until it was dissolved in 1889.

After his retirement from the merchant business, he became involved with the banking, industrial and railroad businesses. He served as a director of the Third National Bank and the Northern Pacific Railroad. In 1895, he became president, and later chairman of the board of directors, of The American Cotton Oil Company (a predecessor company to Bestfoods, now part of Unilever), which was one of the original 12 industrials comprising the Dow Jones Industrial Average in 1896. He retired from the company in 1911 but remained a member of the executive committee in an advisory capacity until his death in 1916. After his death, Clarence M. Woolley, president of the American Radiator Co., was elected to succeed Morrison as a director of the American Cotton Oil Co.

=== Social and club life ===
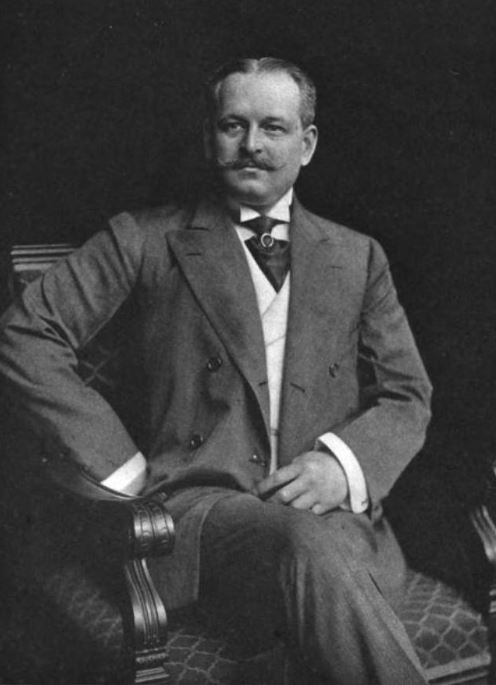
Morrison's second son, Charles King Morrison

Morrison was a life member of the New-York Historical Society and the American Hackney Horse Society, a fellow of the National Academy of Design, a member of the New York Chamber of Commerce, the Metropolitan Museum of Art, the American Museum of Natural History, the New York Botanical Gardens, the Holland Lodge of the State of New York, the St. George's Society, the Century Association, the Metropolitan Club, the Lawyers' Club and the New York Yacht Club.

In November 1864, he was elected a member of the Saint Andrew's Society of the State of New York, becoming a life member in 1881. From 1884 to 1889, he was a manager, from 1889 to 1893, he served as first vice-president, and from 1893 to 1895, as president of the society.

== Personal life ==
On May 26, 1863, he married Lucy Anne King (1844–1891). Lucy, who was born in New Lebanon, New York, was the daughter of Eseck Clarke King and Sarah Coe (née McCullen) King. Together, they lived at 10 East 54th Street and were the parents of:

- George Austin Morrison Jr. (1864–1916), a Harvard and Columbia graduate who married Magdalen S. Worden.
- Charles King Morrison (1867–1920), also a Harvard and Columbia graduate who married Mildred Horsten Hoag, daughter of Dr. William E. Hoag.

His wife died in 1891 and Morrison died at The Kenilworth, his residence in New York City, on February 26, 1916, and his funeral was held at his then residence, 151 Central Park West. His eldest son, and namesake, died shortly thereafter on November 29, 1916. Neither of his sons left children, therefore the Morrison name in this branch of the family became extinct upon his second son's death in 1920.
