= Robert Gordon (banker) =

Scottish-American merchant, banker, and art collector

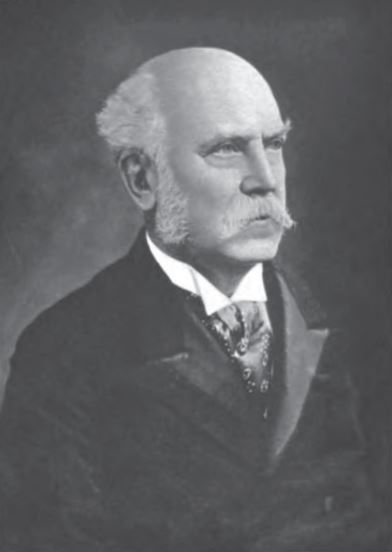
Office positions held
President of the Saint Andrew's Society of the State of New York
In office 1873–1876
Preceded by	James Moir
Succeeded by	James Brand
In office 1869–1872
Preceded by	John Taylor Johnston
Succeeded by	James Moir
In office 1864–1865
Preceded by	Richard Irvin
Succeeded by	William Wood

Personal details
- Born: November 17, 1829 Dumfries, Scotland
- Died: May 16, 1918 (aged 88) Chewton Glen, Christchurch, England
- Spouse: Frances Eleanor Burton (m. 1855; died 1905)
- Children: 6
- Parent(s): William Gordon; Sarah Walker Gordon

Robert Gordon (November 17, 1829 – May 16, 1918) was a Scottish-American merchant, banker, and art collector who served as the president of the Saint Andrew's Society of the State of New York and was a co-founder of the Metropolitan Museum of Art in 1870.

== Early life ==
Gordon was born on November 17, 1829, in Dumfries, Scotland, where he was educated at the Dumfries Academy. He was the son of William Gordon and Sarah (née Walker) Gordon.

== Career ==
In 1846, Gordon began his career in the office of Reid, Irving and Company in Liverpool. In 1849 he sailed to America to work for the firm Maitland, Phelps & Company in New York City. In 1853, he was admitted into the partnership of the firm and remained there until 1884 before returning to England with the intention of retiring.

Once in London, the American banker Junius Spencer Morgan, head of J. S. Morgan & Co. in London, sought out Gordon and requested he join the bank. Gordon agreed and began working there on January 1, 1885. During his fifteen year career with the firm, he worked directly with Walter Hayes Burns, J. Pierpont Morgan, J.P. Morgan Jr., and Walter Spencer Morgan Burns. In 1895, profits were divided such that Pierpont and Burns each took 40% of the profits with Gordon the remaining 20%. He returned for the second time in April 1900, at which time Clinton Edward Dawkins, the former financial member of the Viceroy of India's Council, was admitted to the partnership.

Gordon became a member of the Saint Andrew's Society of the State of New York in 1852, becoming a life member in 1864. He served as manager, second vice-president and as president, three times, from 1864 to 1865, from 1869 to 1798 and, again, from 1873 to 1876. He was also member of the Junior Carlton Club in London, the Century Association in New York, and the Downtown Club, where he served as the first president from 1860 to 1862.

=== Metropolitan Museum of Art ===
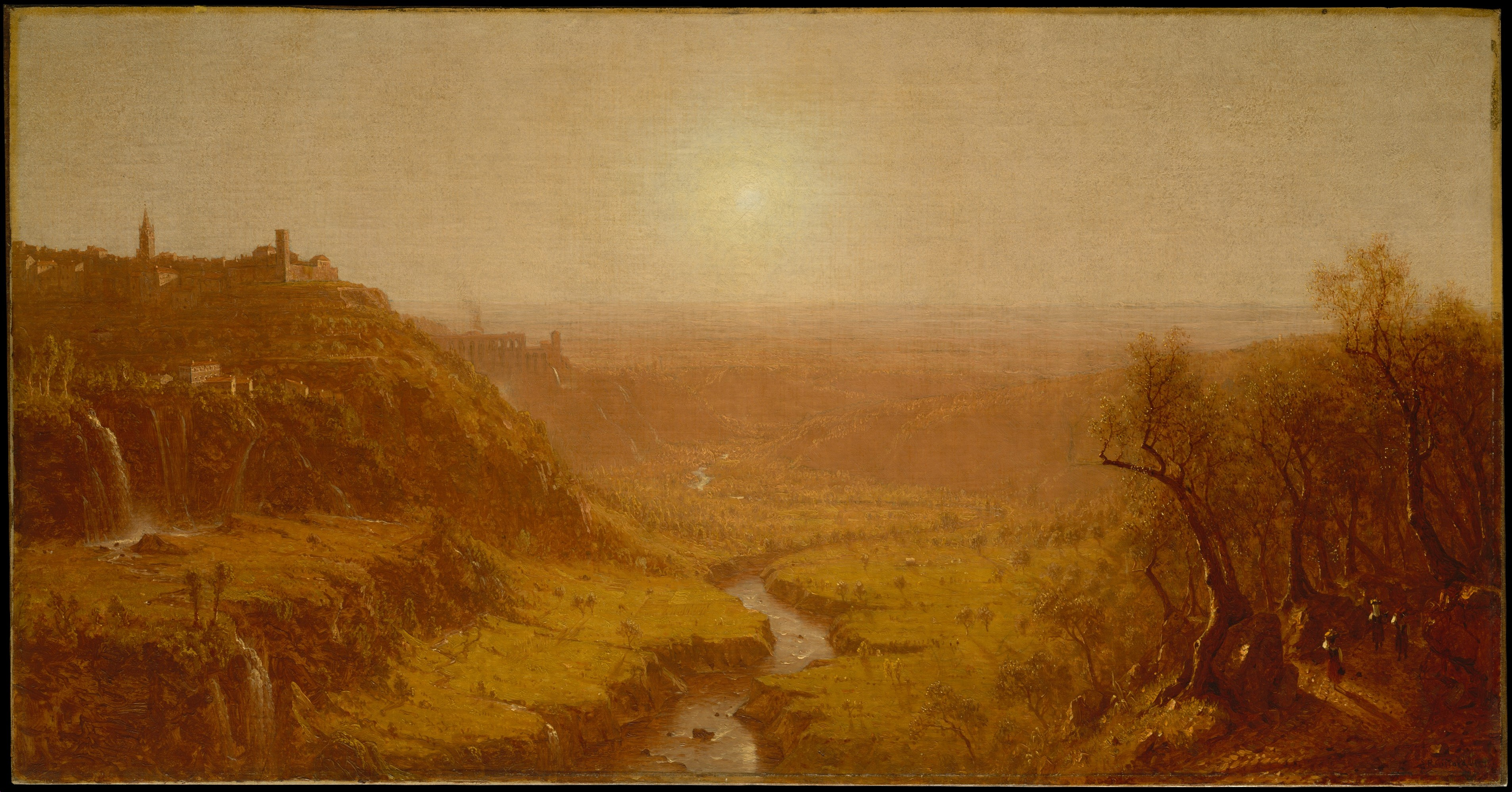
Tivoli, by Sanford Robinson Gifford, 1870. Gift to the Met by Gordon, 1912.

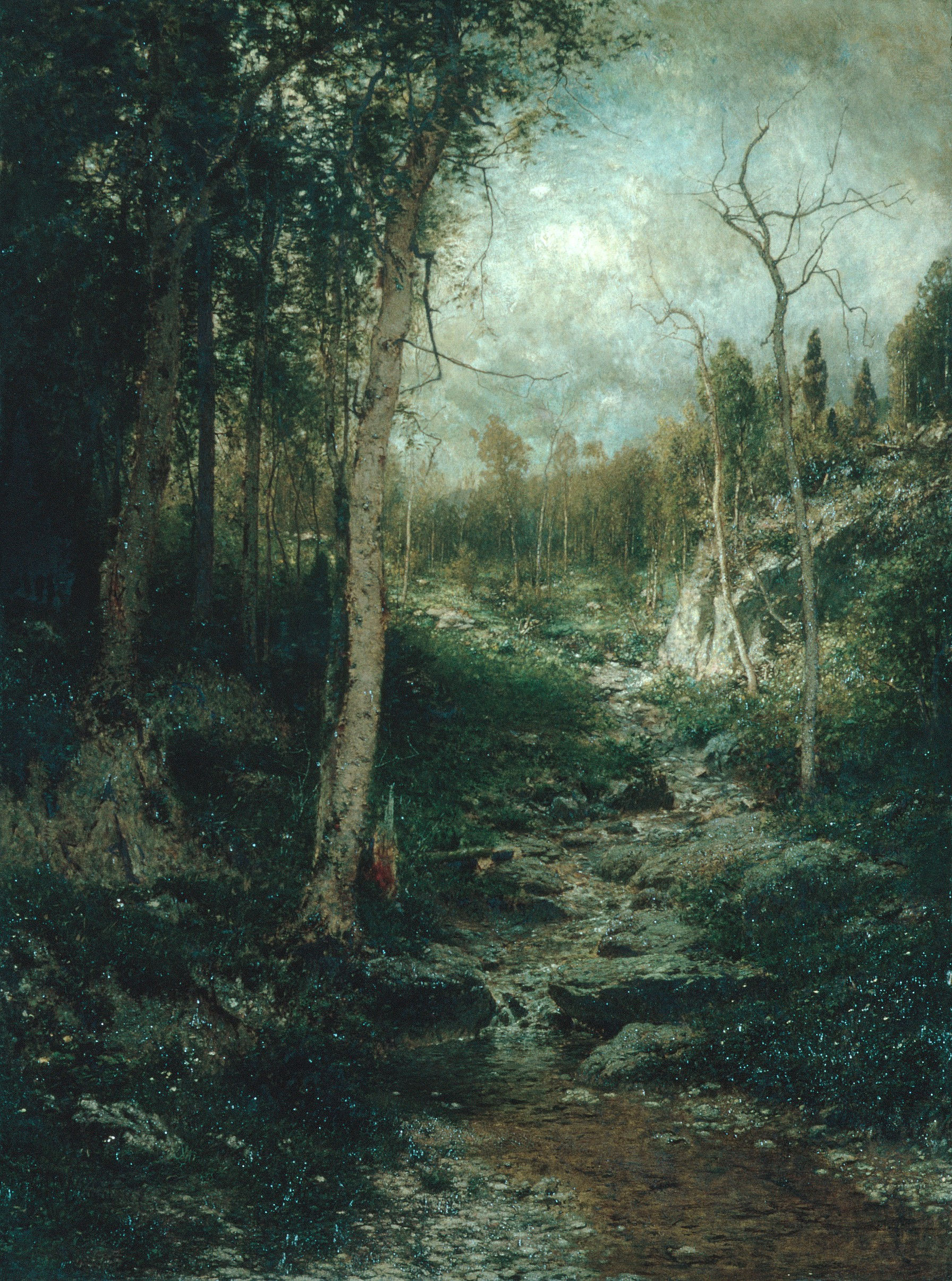
An Old Clearing, by Alexander Helwig Wyant, 1881. Gift to the Met by Gordon, 1912.

In 1870, he was one of the twenty-eight founders of the Metropolitan Museum of Art, serving as its treasurer for many years (and trustee from its inception until he moved to London in 1884),

In 1875, he donated Piero di Cosimo's A Hunting Scene c. 1494–1500, which is considered "one of the most singular works of the Renaissance," and Cosimo's The Return from the Hunt, c. 1494–1500. Both paintings were acquired from the estate of Thomas H. Hotchkiss in 1871.

In 1886, he donated a marble sculpture of Queen Victoria by Mary Grant.

In 1898, he purchased Eastman Johnson's 1881 painting, The Funding Bill directly from the artist, which he also donated to the Museum. The painting featured Robert W. Rutherford, a relative of the painter, and Samuel W. Rowse, an artist, discussing a bill in Congress about the refunding of the national debt.

In 1912, he donated Sanford Robinson Gifford's Tivoli (produced on commission for Gordon in 1870) and Alexander Helwig Wyant's An Old Clearing to the Museum.

== Personal life ==
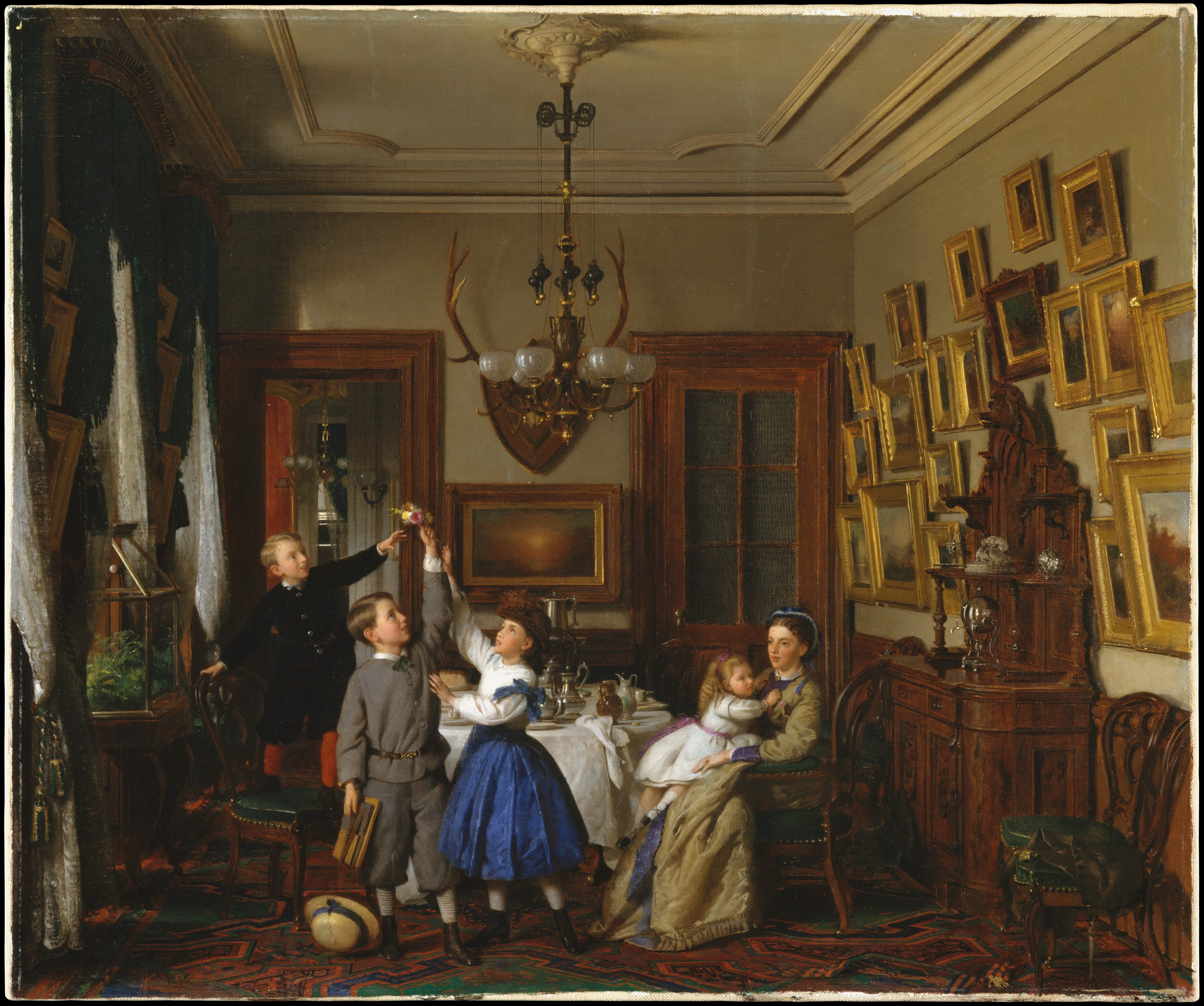
The Contest for the Bouquet: The Family of Robert Gordon in Their New York Dining-Room by Seymour Joseph Guy, 1866.

On April 19, 1855, Gordon was married to Frances Burton (1830–1905) in Staten Island. Frances was a daughter of George Burton and Frances (née Robinson) Burton. Together, they were the parents of six children:

- Frances Eleanor Gordon.
- William Gordon, who met with President and Mrs. Roosevelt at the White House in 1905.
- Henry Alexander Gordon.
- Mary Gordon (1863–1952), who married Lt. Col. Edward Meryon Tinker (1860–1926).
- Lilian Gordon, who married John Trevor Spencer (1859–1906), son of William Cavendish Spencer and grandson of Bishop George Spencer.
- Diana Gordon, who married the Rev. Francis McDonald Etherington.

After his retirement from J. S. Morgan & Co., he lived at his country place, Brockham Park in Betchworth, England, which he purchased in 1901 for £24,000. During World War I, the house and grounds were occupied by the British Army. The estate was sold to Graeme Alexander Lockhart Whitelaw in 1918.

His wife, Frances, died at Brockham Park on December 19, 1905. Gordon died on May 16, 1918, at Chewton Glen in Christchurch, the residence of his son-in-law. At the time of his death, he was one of only two original founders of the Metropolitan Museum living.

=== Legacy ===
In 1866, English painter Seymour Joseph Guy created The Contest for the Bouquet: The Family of Robert Gordon in Their New York Dining-Room which features three of the Gordon children after having finished their breakfast and vying for a "corsage before setting off for school." Besides his family, the painting depicts Gordon's dining room, decorated in the up-to-date Renaissance Revival style, at his home at 7 West 33rd Street.

In 1992, the Museum acquired the painting through a gift of William E. Dodge, by exchange, and Lila Acheson Wallace Gift.
