= St. George's Society of Baltimore =

American charitable and fraternal organization (est. 1867)

The St. George's Society of Baltimore
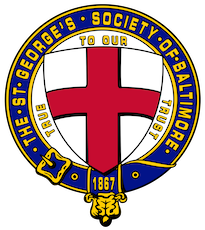
- Type: 501(c)3 charitiable organization
- Established: 1867
- Motto: True to Our Trust
- Eligibility: Individuals of British ancestry
- Status: Extant
- Founder: Stewart Darrell
- President: Zachary J. Dixon
- Senior Vice President: James S. Hana
- Treasurer: Daniel B. Fisher
- Website: https://www.stgeorgesbalt.org/

St. George's Society of Baltimore is an American charitable organization founded in 1867 in Baltimore, which was originally for British subjects and their descendants, but was later extended more broadly to members of the British diaspora. The Society was founded as a benevolent society and a fraternal organization, and remains active today. It takes as its patron Saint George, Patron of England.

== History ==
=== Antecedents ===
Ethnic-based benevolent societies and fraternal organizations had existed in the American Colonies and the early Republic beginning in the mid-eighteenth century. One of the earliest of these was the Saint Andrew's Society of the State of New York and the St. George Society of Philadelphia. A "St. George's Society of Baltimore" was incorporated as early as 2 April 1799, but it was extinct by the time the present society was organized.

In the late nineteenth century, there was a large network of diasporic charitable and fraternal organizations serving Anglo-American communities. In the United States, the largest of these was the Benevolent (sometimes called the "American") Order of the Sons of St. George, and in Canada, its brother organization was the Sons of England Benevolent Society. These larger mutual aid societies, generally aimed at tradesmen and factory workers existed alongside more socially elite hereditary organizations.

=== Early history ===
The St. George's Society of Baltimore was organized in late 1866 by the British Consul, Stewart Darrell, his brother, Charles, and his Vice Consul, J. J. Jackson, Royal Insurance Company representative for the American South. The initial officers were Stewart Darrell, President; W. H. Perot, Vice-President; George H. Williams, Treasurer; and James Belden, Secretary. The inaugural chaplains were the Rev'd Dr W. A. Hewitt, and Rev'd Dr Milo Mahan, of Old Saint Paul's Episcopal Church. Since that time, it has ordinarily had member-chaplains from Episcopal parishes in the city and County, such as the Rev'd Dr Campbell Fair (Church of the Ascension), the Rev'd Dr Hodges (Old Saint Paul's), and the Rev'd Philip James Jensen (St. Thomas Church, Owings Mills).

The Society was formally founded on 21 January 1867 and legally incorporated the next month. The personal influence of the Darrell brothers, as well as Baltimore's proximity to the national capital, resulted in a firm connection between the Society and British diplomatic and military officialdom, both in membership and social engagements. Darrell would later propose one of his successors, Consul-General Denis Donohoe for membership, and many subsequent Consuls had affiliations with the group. Like many other St. George's Societies in other cities, the Baltimore organization was both a hereditary society as well as a beneficent one, providing funds for relief to "distressed English Subjects," especially widows, as well as money for tickets, medical treatment, and burial plots for indigent families.

The organization's purpose, as stated in the charter, was "to afford relief and advice to indigent natives of England or Wales and the British Colonies or to their wives, widows or children; and to promote social intercourse amongst its members." The provision for burial assistance was particularly important, "so that no one of British birth or descent dying far from home of finds need [to] be buried in a pauper's grave." The "endowment of a bed in the Church Home and Infirmary" ensured that "proper medical care and attention may be given to those of our kindred unable to provide such for themselves."

=== Developing sense of diaspora ===
Initially, membership was restricted specifically to those who were English-born and English-descended. On 8 February 1869, the constitution of the Society was amended to replace "England and Wales" with "the United Kingdom," in order that "Scotch and Irish and their descendants could become members." Ethnic conflict among the Anglophone fraternal organizations tended to focus on the Irish question, putting Loyalist Anglo-Irishmen in the Society in a particularly difficult position, especially as Irish independence became increasingly probable. The assassination of Lord Frederick Cavendish in Phoenix Park in 1882, for instance, was discussed at the Baltimore society during orations at an annual dinner

Other St. George's Societies––of both elite and working-class characters––existed across North America, and in 1880, the Baltimore Society joined the North American St. George's Union, although it appears not to have actively participated in that larger organization. It did, however, coordinate with other British fraternal organizations within the city. This was particularly the case after the death of Queen Victoria, when the Society, along with the Hibernian Society, St. Andrew's Society, the Sons of St. George and Daughters of St. George attended a memorial service at Old St Paul's Church, conducted at the same time that "funeral Services for the late beloved Queen [were] held in England."

The Society also approved an official statement of condolence, though questions about whether this resolution was to be sent through British or American authorities precipitated a much larger debate about whether the society was itself English or American. The communique read:

"Whereas it has pleased Almighty God in his inscrutable wisdom to take to himself our most beloved Queen Victoria, bringing grief and sadness to all her subjects, and whereas while humbly submitting to the will of God, we desire to testify to the deep sense of personal loss we all feel in the death of Her, whose pure, upright, and noble life as Queen, wife and mother, has endeared her to every son of the flag in every part of the world."

Ultimately the Society voted to approve its submission through Lord Lansdowne rather than Secretary John Hay, defeating an internal motion to declare that the St. George's Society was "an American Society." The Society would also erect a Victoria Memorial obelisk in Druid Ridge Cemetery, which still stands.

=== Twentieth-century development ===
Across the twentieth century, the Society continued to commemorate major events in the Anglo-American world. A young Winston Churchill was hosted for a lecture on the status of the Second Boer War in 1900. After the sinking of the Titanic in 1912, the Society established a fund for widows and orphans of the ship's crew, and in 1913 special commemorations were made for the Terra Nova Expedition. Services were held and funds were raised during both the First World War (during which a Society member, Montagu Tassel Grant, and his wife perished during the sinking of the RMS Lusitania), and the Second World War. Throughout the first half of the century, the Society regularly feted officers of British and Commonwealth naval vessels, including the Second British Cruiser Squadrom (1905), HMS Norfolk (1933), HMAS Sydney (1953), HMS Sheffield (1954), and three submarines, HMS Osiris, HMS Orpheus, and HMS Walrus (1966).

As constituent parts of British Empire began to gain independence in the Postwar years, the Society's constituency began to extend to citizens and descendants of the Commonwealth and postcolonial states as well. This began as early as 1942 when Sir Girija Shankar Bajpai, then British India's Agent General, addressed the society. Throughout the second half of the century, the Society was addressed by other major British and Commonwealth politicians, including George Jellicoe, 2nd Earl Jellicoe.

Prominent members of the Society in the last decades of the twentieth century included the mayor of Baltimore William Donald Schaefer, and U.S. Senator George L. P. Radcliffe.

== Insignia ==
In 1901, the Society adopted insignia for itself, both for legal documents and for identifying members at services, galas, and parades. The original design was "an English, or Saint George's, Cross on a shield around which appears the motto 'True To Our Trust,' the whole surrounded by a buckled belt with the name 'The St. George's Society of Baltimore' inscribed there on together with 'Inc. 1867'." (The contraction for Incorporation was ultimately omitted). The original die and some records were destroyed in the Great Baltimore Fire. On 20 January 1930, a new design was commissioned, "which is delineated Saint George, fighting with the dragon, surrounded by the name."

== Charitable activities ==
Since its early history, the Society has had an "Almoner" to assist in distributing charitable funds. Today, the organization's charity work is administered by the St. George's Society of Baltimore Foundation. Recently, the Foundation has supported various causes and institutions including the Royal British Legion, The Trussell Trust, the Royal Oak Foundation, the American Memorial Chapel at St. Paul's Cathedral in London, the Invictus Games Foundation, Help for Heroes, and the Prince's Trust, USA.

== Social activities ==
The Society organizes a number of social activities and sporting events, including the St. George's Polo Cup at the Maryland Polo Club. Its major banquets are an annual "Prince of Wales Brunch," a "Trafalgar Night Dinner" (on or around 21 October), and its principal annual dinner for Saint George's Day (on or around 23 April). Toasts at these gatherings have historically emphasized the Transatlantic character of the organization. For instance, during Queen Victoria's reign, toasts were first given in honor of Saint George, then to the Queen, the Prince and Princess of Wales, the President of the United States, "Her Majesty's Ministers and Representatives," "Old England," "Englishmen," "Our Sister Societies throughout the world," and "the press, the great enlightener of mankind."

Unlike the St. George Society of Philadelphia, the Baltimore Society never owned a purpose-built clubhouse. Beginning in the mid-1870s, the Society discussed the possibility of erecting a permanent St. George's Hall by subscription, though nothing came to fruition until the membership furnished a property at 10 West 20th Street in 1900. This dedicated clubhouse was short-lived and by 1911, they relocated to the Rennert Hotel at the corner of Saratoga and Liberty Streets (now demolished). Other homes included 107 West 20th Street and 803 Hamilton Terrace. Today, these gatherings are held at The Maryland Club in Mount Vernon, Baltimore.

The Society retains its historic relationship with the Anglican Church and the Episcopal Diocese of Maryland by annually sponsoring one of the regular services of choral evensong at Grace and St. Peter's Church, and participating in Remembrance Sunday exercises to commemorate the Commonwealth war dead.

== See also ==
- Royal Society of St George
- St. George Society of Philadelphia
