= Walter Watson (banker) =

Scottish-American banker

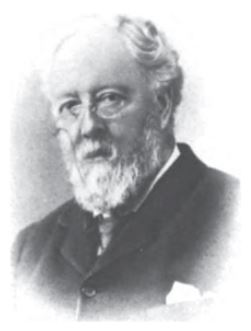

President of the Saint Andrew's Society of the State of New York
- In office 1882–1884
- Preceded by: John Stewart Kennedy
- Succeeded by: John Stewart Kennedy

Personal details
- Born: October 20, 1830; Edinburgh, Scotland
- Died: April 3, 1900 (aged 69); New York City, New York, U.S.
- Spouse: Louisa Matthews Goodhue (m. 1856)
- Children: 5
- Parent(s): Archibald Aitken Watson; Mary Yeaman Watson.
- Education: Royal High School

Walter Watson (October 20, 1830 – April 3, 1900) was a Scottish-American banker.

== Early life ==
Watson was born on October 20, 1830, in Edinburgh, Scotland. He was the son of banker Archibald Aitken Watson and Mary (née Yeaman) Watson. As a boy, he attended Edinburgh High School.

== Career ==
Watson began his career with the Bank of Scotland at Edinburgh before heading in 1854 to the Province of Canada which was quickly growing in commercial and agricultural importance. He first went to London as manager of the Bank of British North America where he stayed for ten years (which merged with the Bank of Montreal in 1918).

In 1864, he moved to New York City where he became manager of the New York branch of the Bank of British North America. After a few years with the Bank, he joined the banking house of Morton, Bliss & Co. founded by Levi P. Morton (later Vice President of the United States). After ten years with Morton, Bliss & Co., he resigned to become the manager of the New York branch of the Bank of Montreal where he stayed for over twenty years, retiring in 1896. During his career, he "made numerous and warm friendships both in business and social life. Two notable Canadian Peers, Lord Strathcona and Mount Royal and Lord Mount Stephen counted him among their intimates and held him in high regard."

After joining the Saint Andrew's Society of the State of New York in November 1864, he served as manager from 1865 to 1866, 1868 to 1870, and 1871 to 1875, as second vice-president from 1876 to 1879, first vice-president from 1879 to 1882, and as president from 1882 to 1884.oed to New York City.

== Personal life ==
On October 23, 1856, he married Louisa Matthews Goodhue (1836–1919) at London, Ontario. Louisa was a daughter of Louisa (née Matthews) Goodhue (daughter of John Matthews, former member of the 9th and 10th Parliament of Upper Canada for Middlesex County) and the Hon. George Jervis Goodhue, a merchant who was a member of the Legislative Council of the Province of Canada. One of her sisters was married to Bishop Benjamin Cronyn and another was married to Francis Wolferstan Thomas of Molson's Bank. Together, Louisa and Walter were the parents of five children, including:

- George Goodhue Hepburn Watson (1857–1925), who married Anne Townsend Barber (1857–1918), sister of Edwin Atlee Barber, in 1883.
- Louisa Mathews Swinton Watson (1859–1881), who died unmarried, aged 21.
- Archibald Aitken Watson (1862–1932), who married Ella Alice Wilson (1867–1942) in 1888.
- Walter William Watson (1864–1963), a banker with E.F. Hutton & Co. who married Annie Duncan (1867–1914) in 1892. After her death, he married Amy Berthold (1892–1961) in 1924.
- Mai Wolferstan St. Andrew Watson (1867-1888), who married George Washington Fuller (1863–1891).

He was a member of the Century Association and the Downtown Club.

Watson died of bronchial pneumonia on April 3, 1900, at his residence, "The Nevada" on Broadway and 70th Street in Manhattan. After his funeral, he was buried at Woodlawn Cemetery in the Bronx.

=== Descendants ===
Through his son George, he was a grandfather to Walter Malcolm Watson (1886–1961) and George Atlee Watson (1893–1937); and through his son Walter, he was a grandfather to William Whitewright Watson (1893–1969) and Mai Duncan Watson (1896–1958), who, in 1914, married (and divorced) Frederick Theodore Frelinghuysen (son of Theodore Frelinghuysen) and, in 1927, James Gordon Douglas.
