= Frederick Moir (African Lakes Corporation) =

Frederick Lewis Maitland Moir (Edinburgh, 1852–1939) was a trader, road-builder and writer in Nyasaland, East Africa, involved in the African Lakes Corporation. In authorship he is known as F. L. M. Moir.

== Early life ==
Moir was born in Edinburgh. He was the younger son of Margaret Louisa Maitland and her husband, Dr. John Innes Allan Moir. His family, including older brother John William Moir (1851–1940), who later married Helen Elizabeth Tod, lived at 52 Castle Street in Edinburgh's New Town.

Through his nephew Dr. Henry Maitland Moir and his wife, Rose Ochterlony, he was great-uncle to Father John Maitland Moir (1924–2013), the Orthodox Chaplain to the University of Edinburgh.

== Career ==
He was accompanied in Africa by his older brother John William Moir who was also an ivory trader and road-builder. While in Africa, he became a trader, road-builder and writer in Nyasaland, East Africa, and was involved in the African Lakes Corporation.

== Personal life ==
On 4 October 1885, he was married to Jane Fordyce Beith. Jane was a daughter of Gilbert Beith MP for Glasgow Central and Inverness Burghs and the granddaughter of Rev. Alexander Beith, D.D. They had three daughters.

He retired to 16 Kensington Gate in Kelvinside in Glasgow.

== Works ==
- After Livingstone. An African trade romance The history of the African Lakes Corporation. With plates 1923
