= James Brand (merchant) =

James Brand FRGS
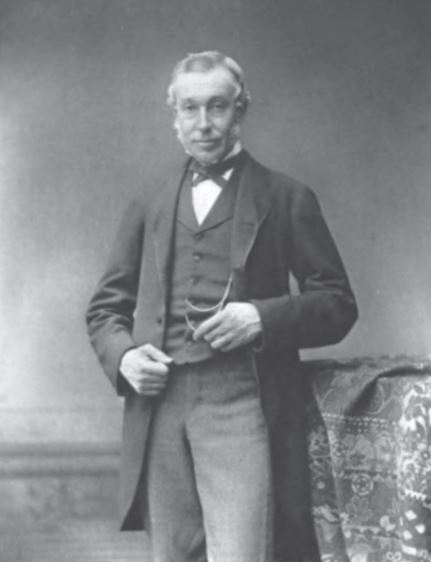

30th President of the Saint Andrew's Society of the State of New York
- In office 1876–1879
- Preceded by: Robert Gordon
- Succeeded by: John Stewart Kennedy

Personal details
- Born: James McQueen Brand; January 31, 1822; Dumfries, Scotland
- Died: May 12, 1897 (aged 75); New York City, U.S.
- Spouse: Julia Marianne Wilson (m. 1860)
- Parent(s): John Brand; Jean McQueen Brand

James McQueen Brand, FRGS (January 31, 1822 – May 12, 1897) was a Scottish-American merchant who served as the president of the Saint Andrew's Society of the State of New York.

== Early life ==
Brand was born on January 31, 1822, in Dumfries, Scotland. He was a son of John Brand (1781–1840), a merchant, and Jean (née McQueen) Brand of the Parish of Crawford, Scotland.

His maternal grandmother was Elizabeth (née Baillie) McQueen of Clydesdale and his mother was a first cousin of Mrs. Welsh, the mother of Jean Baillie Welsh, who married Thomas Carlyle. His was a relative of Charles Cochrane-Baillie, 2nd Baron Lamington, the Governor of Queensland and of Bombay.

He was educated at the Dumfries Academy, before entering the office of his uncle, a West Indian merchant in London, as a young man.

== Career ==
Brand traveled from London to Colombo, Ceylon (now known as Sri Lanka) where he lived for two years before returning to England after inheriting a fortune following his uncle's death. He traveled for sometime, including to the United States, before returning to England again where he became a partner in the firm of Mariet, Barber & Company in 1850, representing the house in London until the outbreak of the U.S. Civil War.

In 1863, he permanently moved to New York City where set up an office on lower Broadway, before relocating to Beekman Street, Cliff Street, Burling Slip and, lastly, to Fulton Street. Brand was one of the early members of the New York Produce Exchange and "imported the first cargo of coffee" to New York (from Ceylon). From 1877 on, he acted as agent for the firms of W.J. Turney & Co. of Stourbridge, and of Sir John Turney at Nottingham, and one of the main importers of Portland cement. He also was a member of the Building Material Exchange and a director of the American Cement Company and the Cheseborough Vaseline Company.

From 1859, Brand was a Fellow of the Royal Geographical Society and became a member of the Saint Andrew's Society of the State of New York in 1850, serving as manager, second vice-president and as president from 1876 to 1879.

== Personal life ==
On February 1, 1860, Brand was married to Julia Marianne Wilson at St James's Church, Piccadilly in London. Julia was the daughter of William Wilson and Eliza Rimington (née Campain) Wilson.

After a ten-day illness, Brand died, without issue, on May 12, 1897, at 27 West 47th Street, his residence in New York City. After a funeral at the Fourth Avenue Presbyterian Church, he was buried at Woodlawn Cemetery in the Bronx.
