= Robert Halliday (businessman) =

Businessman

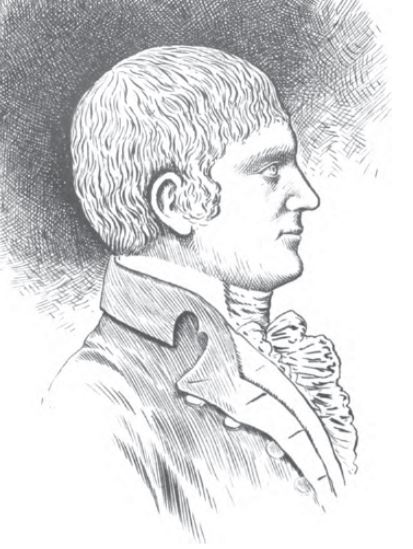

President of the Saint Andrew's Society of the State of New York
- In office 1823–1828
- Preceded by: Archibald Gracie
- Succeeded by: John Graham

Personal details
- Born: January 22, 1781; Ayrshire, Scotland
- Died: April 8, 1840 (aged 69–70); New York City, U.S.
- Spouse: Mary Cairns (m. 1805)
- Children: 6

Robert Halliday (c. 1770 – April 8, 1840) was a Scottish-American businessman.

== Early life ==
Halliday was born in Ayrshire, Scotland around 1770. The Scottish poet, James Montgomery, was a boyhood and lifelong friend of Halliday. At age fourteen, his father died and, as eldest son, he was left in charge of his small estate which Halliday managed for many years with the help of his younger brothers and sisters.

== Career ==
In 1790, Halliday went to Birmingham in England where he lived for six years and learned business. In 1796, he sailed to the United States as the representative for two large Birmingham steel manufacturing firms there, including one run by senior partner name William Cairns. Halliday was very successful in the U.S. and became partner in one of the firms, which was renamed Cairns, Freres, Halliday & Carmichael.

He served as a director of the Greenwich Insurance Company, president of the Northern Dispensary (a hospital on Waverly Place and Christopher Street), chairman of the board of trustees of the Eighth Presbyterian Church in Greenwich Village.

Halliday was elected a member of the Saint Andrew's Society of New York in 1797, a "society instituted for the relief of indigent natives of Scotland, and their descendants." He served as manager from 1814 to 1815, second vice-president from 1815 to 1816, first vice-president from 1816 to 1821 and as president from 1823 to 1828. While Halliday was president, he led the effort to incorporate the Society in New York to better "enable them to obtain the objects of their association."

== Personal life ==
In 1805, Halliday was married to Mary Cairns at Torr Estate in Castle Douglas. Mary was the daughter of Ann (née Humphreys) Cairns and Edward Cairns of Torr and Shirland Hall (in Birmingham), the senior partner in one of the Birmingham steel firms Halliday was associated with and son of William Cairns. Her younger sister Jessie Cairns, was married to New York merchant David Henderson. Together, Mary and Robert were the parents of six children, all born in New York City, namely: Mary Ann Halliday (b. 1806), Josephine Halliday (b. 1809), Agnes Halliday (b. 1811), Edward Cairns Halliday (1817–1905), heir to the Halliday estate., Isabella Halliday (b. 1818), and Robert Halliday Jr. (b. 1823).

He built a home in New York that was bounded by Greenwich Street, Washington Street, Bank Street and Bethune Street that had a clear view of the North River before the river front was filled in. On his property, he had his own business office, private bulk-head, bath house, and extensive landscaping.

Halliday, who during his lifetime was said to have been six foot three, weighed 240 pounds and was a man of great physical strength, died on April 8, 1840, at his residence in New York City.
