= Maitland Moir =

John Maitland Moir (18 June 1924 – 17 April 2013) was a priest of the Orthodox Church of St Andrew in Edinburgh, and founder of several Orthodox communities in Scotland. He was Orthodox Chaplain to the University of Edinburgh.

== Life ==
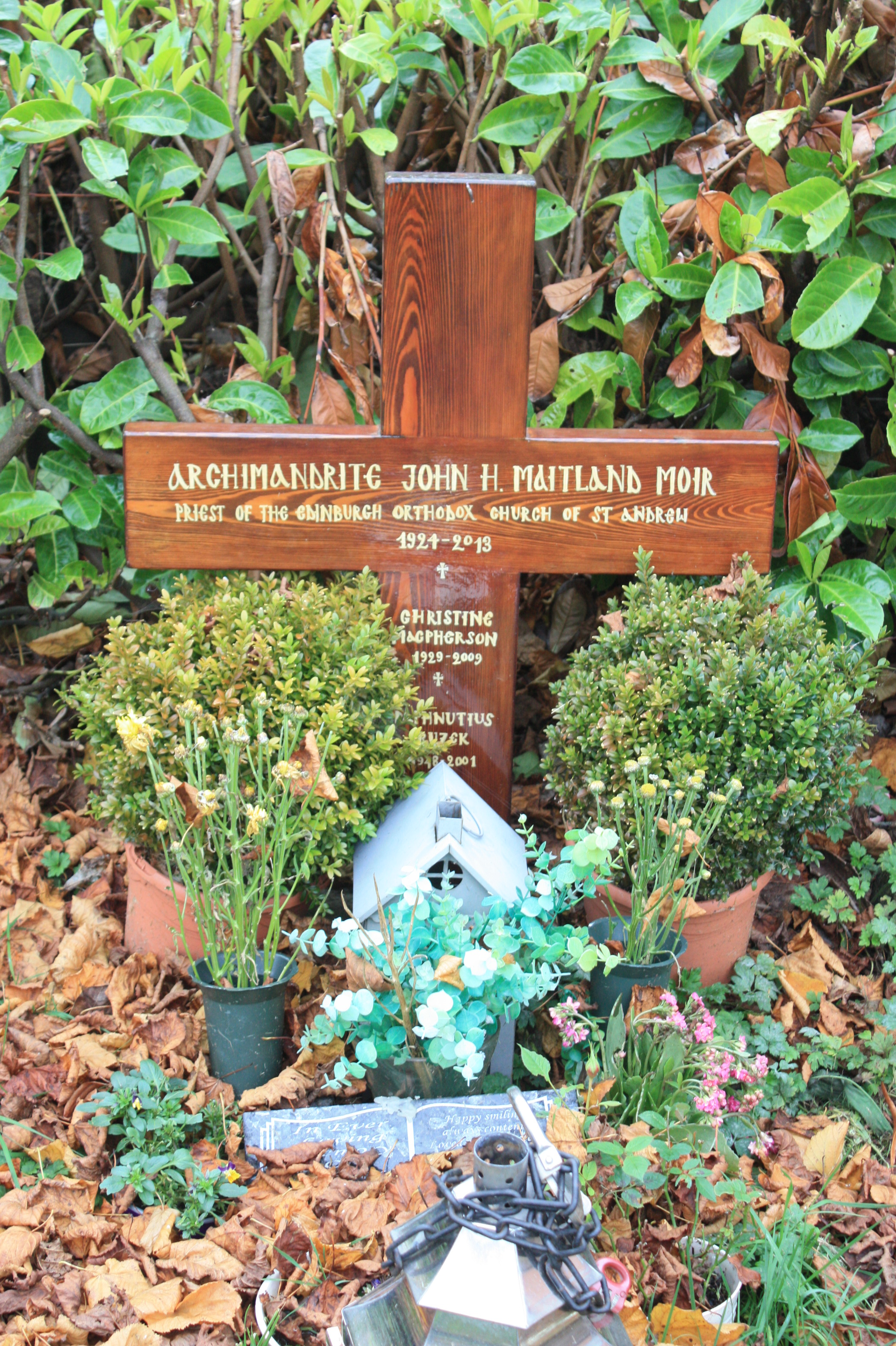
Moir's grave, Dean Cemetery

He was born in Currie in the south-west outskirts of Edinburgh, Scotland, 18 June 1924, the only son of the wealthy Rose Ochterlony and her husband local doctor Henry Maitland Moir (grandson of John Moir) He suffered from a weakness of the knees his whole life which meant he was isolated from other children by his parents.

He attended Edinburgh Academy before going on to study Classics at the University of Edinburgh. He was not fit enough to serve during World War II. After the war he briefly served as Classics Master at Cargilfield School before deciding to return to studies at Christ Church, Oxford and Cuddesdon Theological College, having sparked at interest in the Eastern Orthodox Church whilst in Oxford. From 1950-51 he took this interest further, travelling to study at the Halki Theological College in Istanbul, where he studied the Orthodox church. During this period he also travelled to the Holy Land and other sites of religious significance in the Middle East.

He returned to Scotland in 1952, but adopted a role in the Episcopalian Church, being ordained at the age of 27, serving as honorary chaplain in St Marys Episcopalian Cathedral in western Edinburgh. In 1967 he moved to Moray as chaplain to the Bishop of Moray, and then to St Andrews Cathedral, Inverness, serving as Canon. Here he famously won the chastisement of the Bishop for wearing a kilt beneath his cassock.

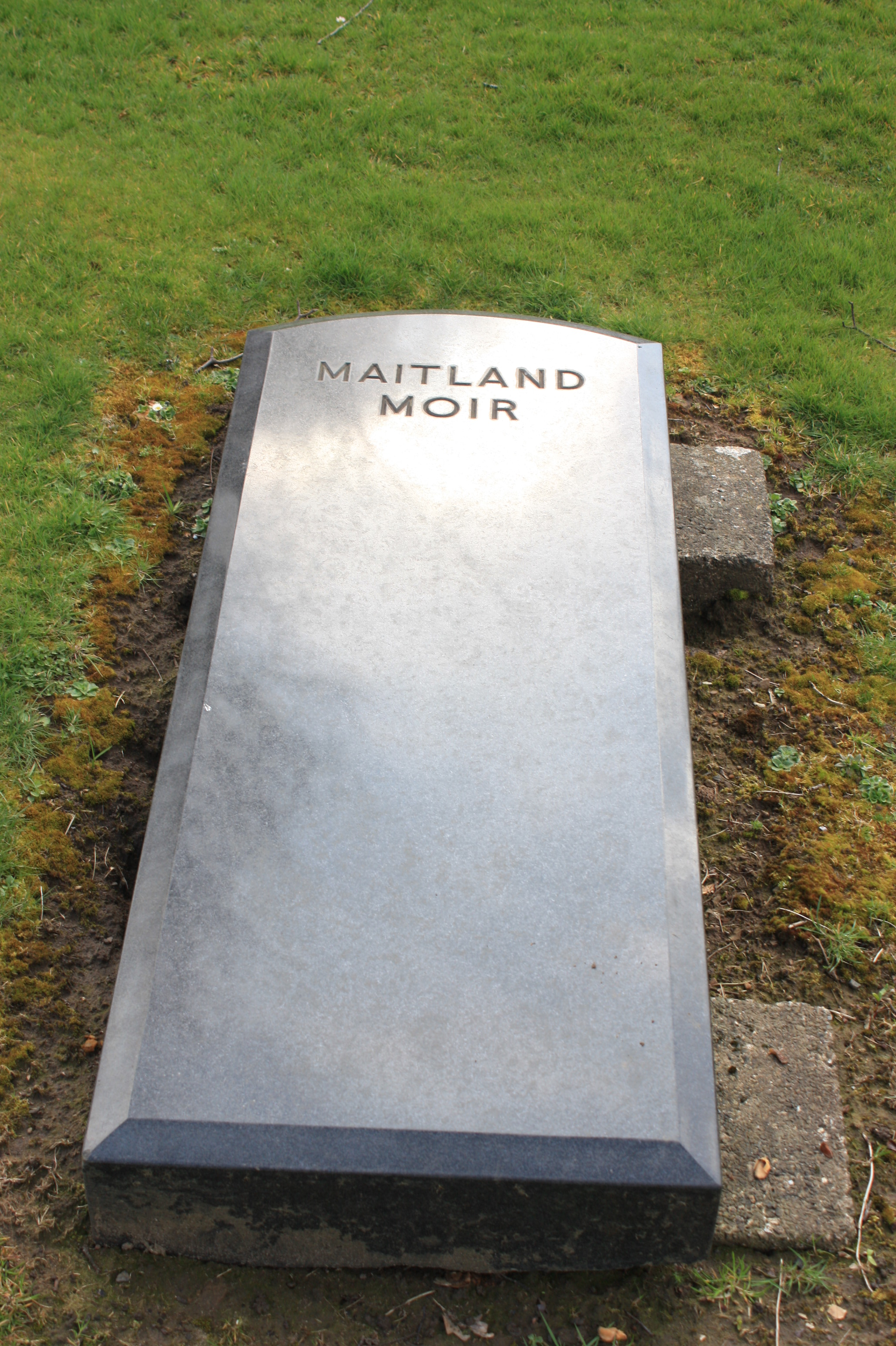
The second memorial to Maitland Moir in Currie Churchyard

In 1981 he resigned from the Scottish Episcopalian Church, desiring a purer form of devotion and travelled to Mount Athos home of some of the roots of Christianity. This was greatly aided by his being fluent in Greek. He was received into the Orthodox Church and stayed at the monastery at Simonopetra. He returned to Britain in 1982 to serve as an Orthodox Priest in the Greek Orthodox Archdiocese of Thyateira and Great Britain. He initially spent three years in Coventry before returning to Scotland. In Edinburgh he united two small Orthodox communities, one Slavonic and one Greek, into a single community, named the Orthodox Community of St Andrew. He travelled across Scotland serving other small groups of Orthodox Christians. To break down barriers in the often multi-cultural groups, English was established as the language of worship.

A parallel service was given to the University of Edinburgh for its many Orthodox Christian students, who had previously gone unserved. This found a home in the former Buccleuch Parish School on The Meadows. His new church was served by two further priests: Father Avraamy Neyman and Father (now Bishop) Raphael Pavouris, and a deacon (now priest) Fr Luke.

In private life he followed a regime of prayer and fasting. He ate only once per day. He would often be found sheltering or feeding the homeless. He avidly wrote in opposition to torture and imprisonment on religious grounds. He was an early advocate of recycling.

In 2001 he hit the national newspaper headlines, when (against a court ruling) he aided an 8 year old child and her mother escape a violent father, finding them secret accommodation in Greece.

He rose to the role of Archmandrite, a highly esteemed position within the Greek Orthodox Church.

In his final year he went blind and almost totally deaf.

He died at Edinburgh Royal Infirmary on 17 April 2013. On the day he died the Orthodox Church secured the purchase of the former Buccleuch Parish Church (used as storage by the university) to convert into a bespoke Orthodox Church. This was an objective which he had worked towards for several years.

The Dean of Gibraltar, Canon W. Gordon Reid, described him as "a great man, though so humble that he kept it hidden".

The funeral service was conducted on 24 April at St Peter’s Episcopal Church on Lutton Place, the Orthodox Chapel being too small for the purpose.

He was buried in the northern 20th century extension to Dean Cemetery, near the west wall. A second, grander memorial was added by the edge of the western path in Currie churchyard, close to his original home.
