= John Stewart Kennedy =

American businessman, financier and philanthropist

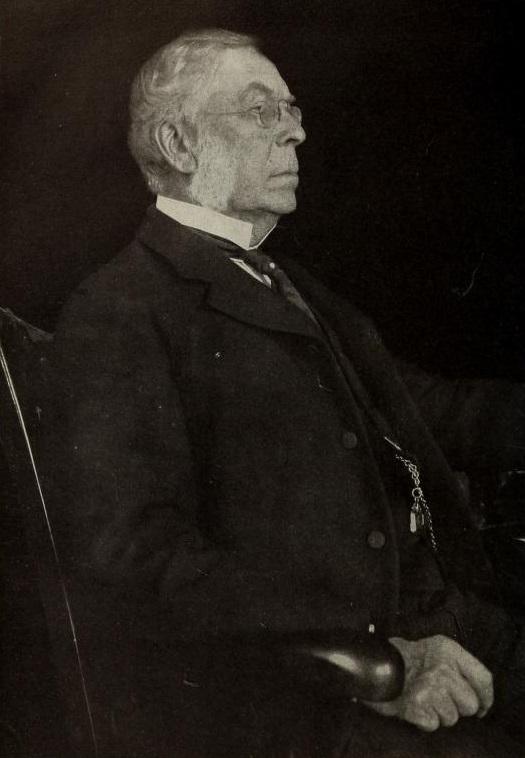

President of the Saint Andrew's Society of the State of New York
- In office 1884–1887
- Preceded by: Walter Watson
- Succeeded by: Bryce Gray
- In office 1879–1882
- Preceded by: James Brand
- Succeeded by: Walter Watson

Personal details
- Born: January 4, 1830 Blantyre, Scotland
- Died: October 30, 1909 (aged 79) New York City, New York, U.S.
- Spouse: Emma Baker (m. 1858)
- Relations: John Kennedy Tod (nephew)
- Occupation: Businessman, financier, philanthropist
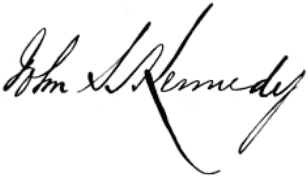
- Signature

John Stewart Kennedy (January 4, 1830 – October 30, 1909) was a Scottish-born American businessman, financier and philanthropist. He was a member of the Jekyll Island Club (also known as The Millionaires' Club) on Jekyll Island, Georgia along with J.P. Morgan and William Rockefeller among others.

== Early life ==
Kennedy was born at Blantyre in Scotland on January 4, 1830. He was the fifth son of nine children born to John Kennedy and Isabella (née Stewart) Kennedy.

While a child, his family moved to Glasgow where he was educated until the age of thirteen before entering a shipping office as a clerk while still attending morning and evening classes in an attempt to complete his education.

== Career ==
From 1847 until 1850, he was a salesman with the Mossend Iron & Coal Company. In 1850, at age twenty, he was asked by William Bird, of the iron firm William Bird & Company of London, whom Kennedy had met during Bird's visit to Glasgow, to become the firm's representative in the United States and Canada.

He arrived in the New York on June 29, 1850, and spent the next two years traveling to all the major cities in Canada and the United States, including Quebec and New Orleans. In Autumn 1852, he returned to Glasgow to lead the branch office of the firm following the accidental drowning of his brother who had led the office. Kennedy remained in Glasgow until 1856.

=== M.K. Jesup & Company ===
Kennedy returned to New York in December 1856, and formed a partnership with Morris Ketchum Jesup known as M.K. Jesup & Company that began with a focus on railroad iron and materials but eventually shifted to banking. From this partnership he retired in 1867 and spent a year traveling abroad.

During his partnership with Jesup, he spent a year in Chicago where he established a branch of the firm under the name Jesup, Kennedy & Co.

=== J.S. Kennedy & Company ===
In 1868, he formed J.S. Kennedy & Company, a banking firm, and spent the next fifteen years devoting himself to "financial affairs of magnitude and importance." He aided in the reorganization of various financial concerns, notably in 1888, when he acted with J. S. Harris as receiver of the New Jersey Central Railroad, and served as president of the International & Great Northern Railroad Company of Texas as well as a director, and vice-president, of the Indianapolis, Cincinnati and Lafayette Railroad Company of which he helped reorganize after its 1870 bankruptcy.

In 1872, Kennedy and Sir William John Menzies of Edinburgh organized the Scottish American Investment Company in Scotland. J.S. Kennedy & Company acted as the American agent of the Company which invested solely in bonds issued by North American railroad companies. Over time, the investment portfolio broadened out over time to include shares as well as bonds and industrial, commercial and public utility companies.

In 1878 Kennedy was instructed as USA liquidator on behalf of the shareholders of the City of Glasgow Bank to recover, primarily railroad assets, American securities of $5 million.

On December 1, 1883, he retired and left the firm to his nephews, John Kennedy Tod and Robert Elliot Tod, as well as other junior partners who reorganized the firm under the name J. Kennedy Tod & Company. In retirement, Kennedy broadened his role as a financier with diverse interests in leading New York financial intermediaries. Kennedy held the post of president pro tem of the Bank of the Manhattan Company from 1883 to 1884, when he became vice president until he resigned for reasons of health in 1888.

Kennedy also served as a trustee of the Central Trust Company from 1882 until he died. Kennedy held similar positions with the National Bank of Commerce from 1887 to 1909, the New York Life Insurance Company from 1903 to 1906, the Title Guarantee and Trust Company from 1895 to 1909, and the United States Trust Company of New York from 1896 to 1909. As a result of his varied banking activities, Kennedy became a central figure in the history of American banking and in the New York business community.

== Personal life ==
In 1858, he was married to Emma Baker (1833–1930) in Elizabeth, New Jersey, only two years after moving to New York City. Emma was the daughter of Jenette Ten Eyck (née Edgar) Baker and Cornelius Baker, one of the founders of New York University. He had no children but mentored his sister Mary Kennedy's son John Kennedy Tod in the international banking and investment profession.

He was a member of the Century Association, Metropolitan Club, Downtown Club, Grolier Club, Union League Club, City Club, New York Yacht Club and Atlantic Yacht Clubs, the Jekyl Island Club, and the New-York Historical Society.

Kennedy died of whooping cough in 1909 at his home, 6 West 57 Street in New York. Honorary pallbearers at his funeral included, Stephen Baker, president of the Bank of Manhattan Company (son of Stephen Baker); Nicholas Murray Butler, president of Columbia University; Robert W. DeForest, president of the Charity Organization Society; Cleveland H. Dodge; Howard Elliot, president of the Northern Pacific Railway; Seth Low; J. Pierpont Morgan; George A. Morrison; former President of the St. Andrews Society; Henry L. Smith, John A. Stewart and Frederick Sturges, Vice President of the Presbyterian Hospital. Others present in the church for his funeral were Andrew Carnegie and his wife, Louise Whitfield Carnegie, Henry De Forest and Eugene Delano.

His widow continued his philanthropy after his death and gave millions of dollars to educational and charitable causes. She died at their summer home, Kenarden Lodge in Bar Harbor, Maine in July 1930 at the age of 96.

=== Philanthropy and legacy ===
Kennedy was prominently connected during his life with New York charities, and his will gave away $30,000,000—bequests of $2,500,000 each to Columbia University, the New York Public Library, Metropolitan Museum of Art, Presbyterian Board of Home Missions, Presbyterian Board of Foreign Missions, Presbyterian Church Erection Fund, and Presbyterian Hospital of New York City; four gifts of $1,500,000 each; three of $750,000 each; nine (to colleges) of $100,000 each; and 10 (to colleges) of $50,000 each; besides numerous smaller gifts.

Kennedy was also the President of the Board of Trustees of Robert College, Istanbul, Turkey, and the chairman of the Presbyterian Hospital and United Charities boards, Second Vice President and a member of the executive committee of the Metropolitan Museum of Art, Second Vice President of the New York Public Library, and was at one time the Vice President of the New York Chamber of Commerce.

As well as his many positions in finance Kennedy was a keen art collector. In his later life Kennedy donated many pieces to the Metropolitan Museum of Art including the second painting of Emanuel Gottlieb Leutze's famous Washington Crossing the Delaware, a full-sized replica of the first, in 1897.

During his life Kennedy also funded the construction of Hamilton Hall, the home of Columbia University. The building is named after Alexander Hamilton; an American statesman and one of the Founding Fathers of the United States, who attended King's College, Columbia's original name.

The city of Kennedy, Minnesota is named for him.
