= Andrew Halliday Douglas =

Scottish physician (1819–1908)

Andrew Halliday Douglas (1819-1908) was a Scottish physician who served as president of the Royal College of Physicians of Edinburgh 1869 to 1871. He was one of the founders of the Edinburgh Medical Missionary Society with Peter David Handyside.

== Life ==
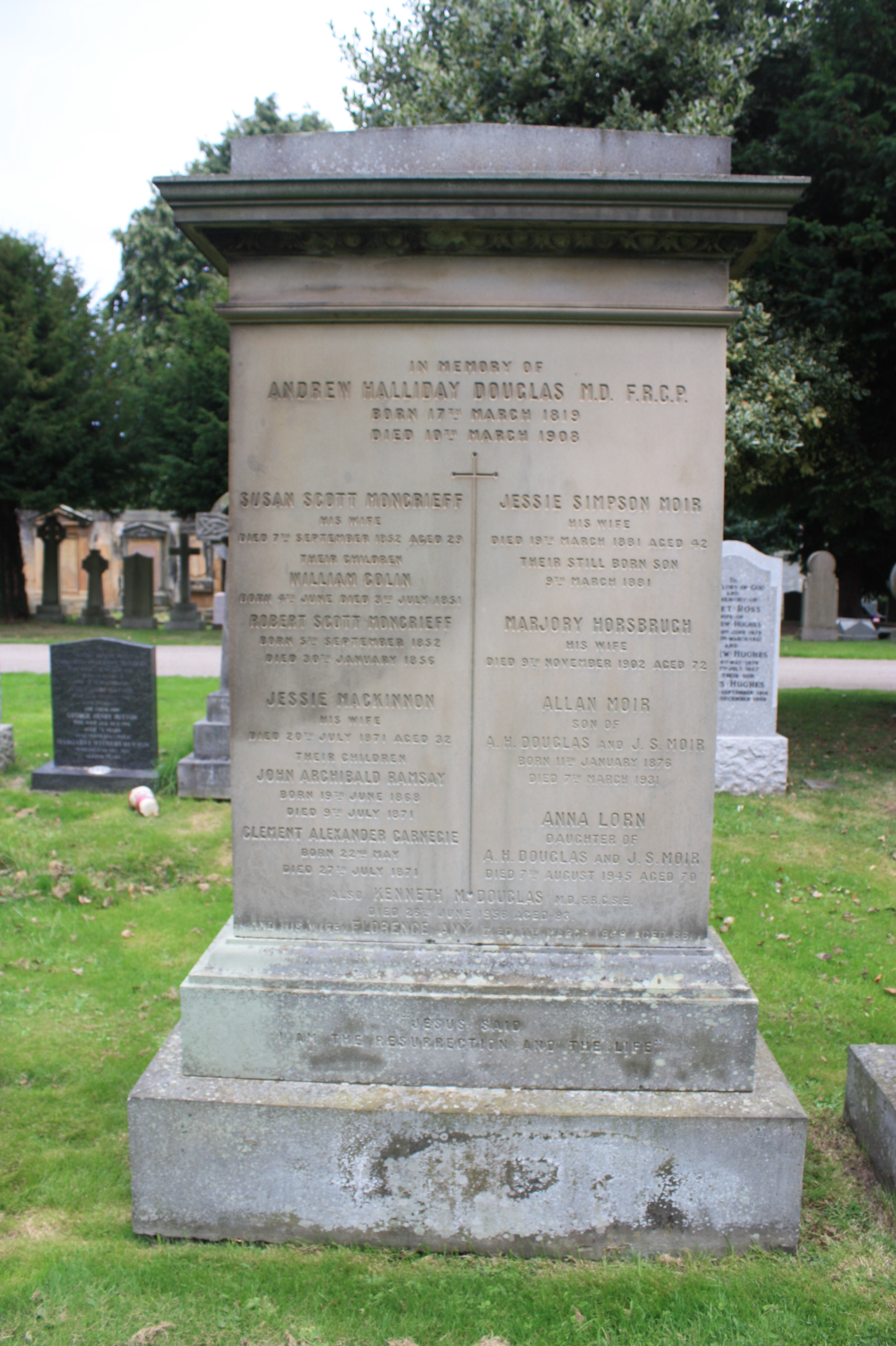
The grave of Andrew Halliday Douglas, Dean Cemetery

He was born at 5 Charlotte Street (off Charlotte Square) in Edinburgh on 17 March 1819 the son of William Douglas WS and Anna Brown. He studied medicine at Edinburgh University graduating in 1840.

In 1844 he was elected a member of the Harveian Society of Edinburgh and served as President in 1866.

In 1848 he became a Senior Physician at the Edinburgh Royal Infirmary. In 1858 he became medical officer to the Post Office. In 1869 he was elected president of the Royal College of Physicians of Edinburgh in succession to Dr John Moir, his father-in-law. At this time he lived at 26 India Street in Edinburgh's Second New Town.

He retired in 1893 due to health problems but some winters spent in the south of France improved him.

He had a stroke in December 1907 and was again in poor health thereafter. He died of a cerebral thrombosis at home in Edinburgh on 10 March 1908. He is buried in Dean Cemetery with his family. The grave is marked by a large but simple monument and stands in the south-east section.

== Family ==
His tombstone relates a sad family history.

He was married four times: firstly to the wealthy Susan Scott Moncrieff, who died childbirth in 1852 (the child died two days later). He secondly married Jessie MacKinnon (b. 1839) who died in 1871, shortly after childbirth. He then married Jessie Simpson Moir (1839-1881), daughter of Dr John Moir. They had a daughter, Anna Lorn Douglas (1875-1945) and a son, Allan Moir Douglas (1876-1931) but his wife died in 1881, ten days after the birth of their stillborn son. Finally he married Marjory Horsburgh (1830-1902).

His son Rev Prof Andrew Halliday Douglas (1864-1902) moved to Canada to teach Apologetics at Knox College, Toronto, but died young following the removal of his appendix. He is also buried in Dean Cemetery in front of his father's grave.

== Publications ==
- Douglas, Andrew Halliday (1910). Douglas, Charles; Hardie, Robert Purves (eds.). The Philosophy and Psychology of Pietro Pomponazzi . Cambridge, UK: University Press. OCLC 752621473 – via Wikisource.
