= George Morrison (cricketer) =

Irish cricketer and artist (1915–1993)

Personal information
- Full name: George Charles Morrison
- Born: 27 June 1915; Downpatrick, Ireland
- Died: 11 October 1993 (aged 78); Stranmillis, Northern Ireland
- Batting: Right-handed
- Bowling: Right-arm medium

Domestic team information
- Years: Team
- 1947: Ireland

Career statistics
Competition	First-class
Matches	2
Runs scored	48
Batting average	12.00
100s/50s	0/0
Top score	16
Balls bowled	84
Wickets	0
Bowling average	–
5 wickets in innings	–
10 wickets in match	–
Best bowling	–
Catches/stumpings	0/–
- Source: Cricinfo, 1 November 2018

George Charles Morrison HRUA (27 June 1915 – 11 October 1993) was an Irish first-class cricketer, teacher, and landscape artist. He was a founding member of the Ulster Watercolour Society in 1976, and was tutor to the Civil Service Art Club, with whom he also exhibited.

== Early life ==
Morrison was born at Downpatrick in June 1915, the eldest son of Mr & Mrs Thomas H Morrison. He was educated in Belfast at Methodist College, before going to Queen's University where he was to attain a Diploma in Education in 1937 and a Higher Diploma in Education in the following year. In 1950 Morrison married Persis Ross of Belfast.

== The cricketer ==
Morrison played his club cricket for Queen's University Cricket Club and later the North of Ireland, Morrison made his debut in first-class cricket for Ireland against Yorkshire at Harrogate on Ireland's 1947 tour of England. He made a further first-class appearance on the tour, against Derbyshire at Buxton. Morrison scored a total of 48 runs in these two matches, as well as bowling fourteen wicket-less overs of medium pace. Later that summer, he played two minor matches against the touring South Africans at Belfast. Morrison continued to play club cricket for North of Ireland until 1956, bringing to an end a seventeen-year association with the team. Morrison the talented cricketer, was also a noted landscape painter.

== The artist ==
Morrison was a self-taught artist who was a Principal Lecturer in Education at Stranmillis College.

Morrison first exhibited his paintings at the Ulster Academy of Arts Spring Exhibition in 1945. On reviewing the 1945 show art critic in the Belfast Newsletter complimented the "delicacy of line in the trees which George C Morrison uses in a couple of his compositions". He returned to the same venue in 1946, 1948 and 1949 showing 3 paintings each year, with all but one being landscapes.

In 1950 Morrison exhibited at the Belfast Museum and Art Gallery with the Royal Ulster Academy of Arts for the first time. Morrison continued to show at their annual exhibitions every year until 1980, with the exception of 1971 and 1972 when due to civil unrest the annual event was cancelled. In the autumn show of 1955 one critic commented, "In his study of The Artist's Mother George C Morrison breaks new ground for himself and gives promise of further advance," whilst a second critic refers to it as "the most sensitive character study in the exhibition."

In the 30 years between 1950 and 1980, Morrison contributed a total of 63 paintings to the annual exhibitions of the RUA. Morrison was elected an Associate of the RUA in 1964 at the same time as Raymond Piper, Romeo Toogood, David Crone, and future President Richard Croft. He became an Academician in 1975 and he also filled the role of chairman of the RUA in the same year.

In 1964 Morrison showed with the Royal Ulster Academy Association at Anderson and McAuley's department store where he presented Trees described by one critic as "patterned convolutions." In 1966 Morrison had a solo show of watercolours at the Bell Gallery in Belfast. 1970 saw Morrison exhibit a collection of watercolours at the Chicester Galleries including Kilkeel, The Rosses, Co. Donegal, Timoleague Abbey, and the Cézanne-inspired Pathway.

Victor Chromes and Aldo Galea joined with Morrison in 1980 to display their works at the Royal Hotel in Bangor. In 1982 Morrison held an exhibition at the Cleft Gallery in Omagh. Morrow showed a number of works including Frozen Stream and Bare Trees, Strangford Lough, with Joy Clements, Mercy Hunter and three other Ulster artists at the Malone Gallery, Belfast in 1982.

== Death ==
Seventy-eight year old George Charles Morrison died suddenly after delivering a class at Stranmillis in Belfast on 11 October 1993.

His works can be found in several public and private collections, including the National Self-Portrait Collection of Ireland, and the Royal Ulster Academy of Arts Diploma Collection.
