= Arthur Hunter =

American executive

Arthur Hunter (1869–1964) was an American executive.

== Early life and education ==
Hunter was born in 1869 in Edinburgh, Scotland. He studied at George Watson's College.

== Career ==
Hunter relocated to the United States in 1892, initially working at Fidelity Mutual Life before his tenure at New York Life. He served as the vice president and chief actuary at New York Life Insurance Company.

During World War I, he served as the chief consulting actuary for the U.S. Government and chaired the advisory board on military and naval insurance for the War Risk Bureau, earning recognition from both France (Legion of Honor) and Britain (a service medal).

During his career, Hunter wrote more than fifty papers for the Actuarial Society of America, where he was a fellow and past president. He co-edited the textbook Alcohol and Man with Oscar H. Rogers, the former medical director of New York Life.

Hunter was also a founding member of the Casualty Actuarial Society. After his retirement in 1941, he served as a director of the Blue Shield Doctors' Plan.

== Numerical Rating System ==
Hunter is recognized for introducing the Numerical Rating System, a method that enhanced the accuracy of life insurance risk assessments, particularly for cases presenting higher mortality risks. His work also involved formulating mortality tables for tropical and sub-tropical regions, as well as disability rates tables. The compiled tables are now known as Hunters' Tables on Life and Mortality.
