= George Morrison (Australian footballer) =

Australian rules footballer (1873–1942)

Personal information
- Full name: George Henry Morrison
- Born: 1 February 1873; North Melbourne, Victoria
- Died: 8 August 1942 (aged 69); East Melbourne, Victoria
- Original team: Cheltenham

Playing career^{1}
Years	Club	Games (Goals)
1897, 1899	St Kilda	6 (0)
- ^{1} Playing statistics correct to the end of 1899.

George Henry Morrison (1 February 1873 – 8 August 1942) was an Australian rules footballer who played with St Kilda in the Victorian Football League (VFL).

== Family ==
The son of the tailor, Robert William Morrison, and Margaret Jane Morrison (1835–1885), née McBain, George Henry Morrison (later known as Henry George Morrison) was born at North Melbourne, Victoria on 1 February 1873.

He married Honorah Veronica Bailey (1880–1918) in 1904. They had two children: Irene, and Henry George.

== Football ==
=== Richmond (VFA) ===
Recruited from Cheltenham, he played in 10 matches (2 goals) for Richmond in the VFA in 1895 and 1896, before transferring, during 1896 to Fremantle, West Australia.

=== St Kilda (VFL) ===
Cleared from Richmond in May 1899, Morrison played 5 games for St Kilda in the 1899 VFL season: the first, against Fitzroy, at the Brunswick Street Oval, on 27 May 1899, and the last, against Collingwood, at the Junction Oval on 15 July 1899.

== Death ==
Henry George Morrison died at East Melbourne, Victoria on 8 August 1942.
