= St. George Society of Philadelphia =

18th century American organization

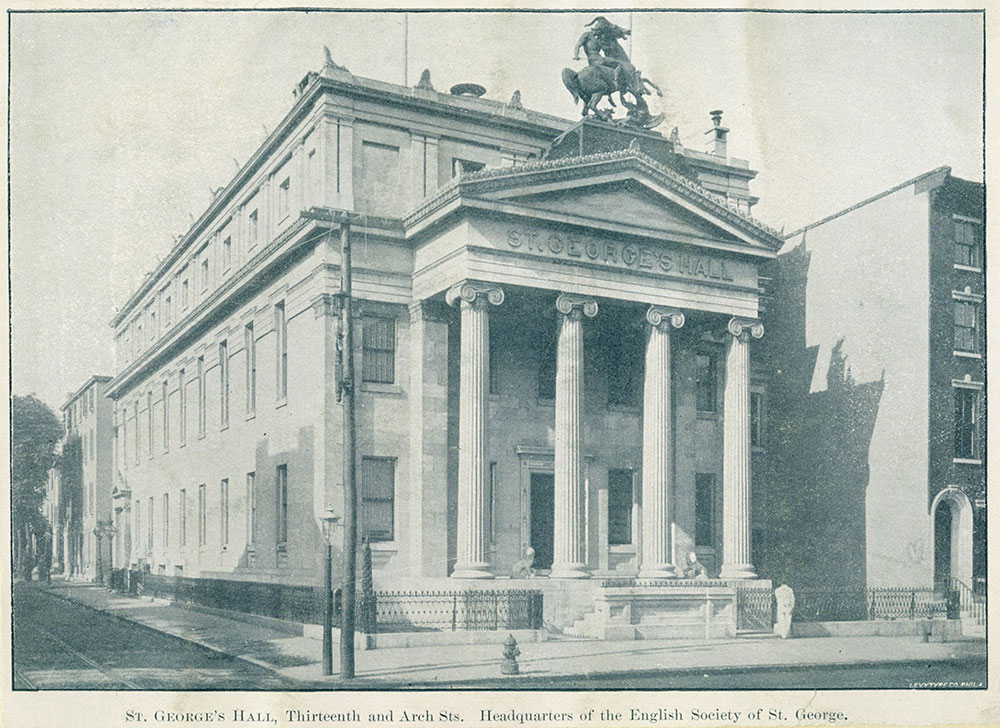
St. George's Hall, at the corner of Arch St. and 13th St.

The Society of the Sons of St. George, Established at Philadelphia for the Advice and Assistance of Englishmen in Distress was an organization founded in Philadelphia, Pennsylvania, on Saint George's Day, April 23, 1772. Earlier meetings were reportedly held at Tun Tavern.

The society's charter in its act of incorporation approved by the Pennsylvania assembly on April 6, 1791, states:

To all to whom these presents shall come, Greeting, know ye that we whose names are hereunto subscribed, being citizens of the Commonwealth of Pennsylvania, having associated for the purpose of establishing in Philadelphia, a society for the advice and assistance of Englishmen, in distress, and being desirous of acquiring and enjoying the powers, and immunities of a corporation or body politic in law, according to an act of assembly of the commonwealth of Pennsylvania, passed the sixth day of April, one thousand seven hundred and ninety-one, do hereby declare, that we have associated ourselves together for the purpose aforesaid, by the name, stile, and title, and under the articles and conditions following, that is to say: Article I. That the name style and title of this corporation, shall be "The Society of the Sons of St. George, established at Philadelphia, for the advice and assistance of Englishmen in distress.

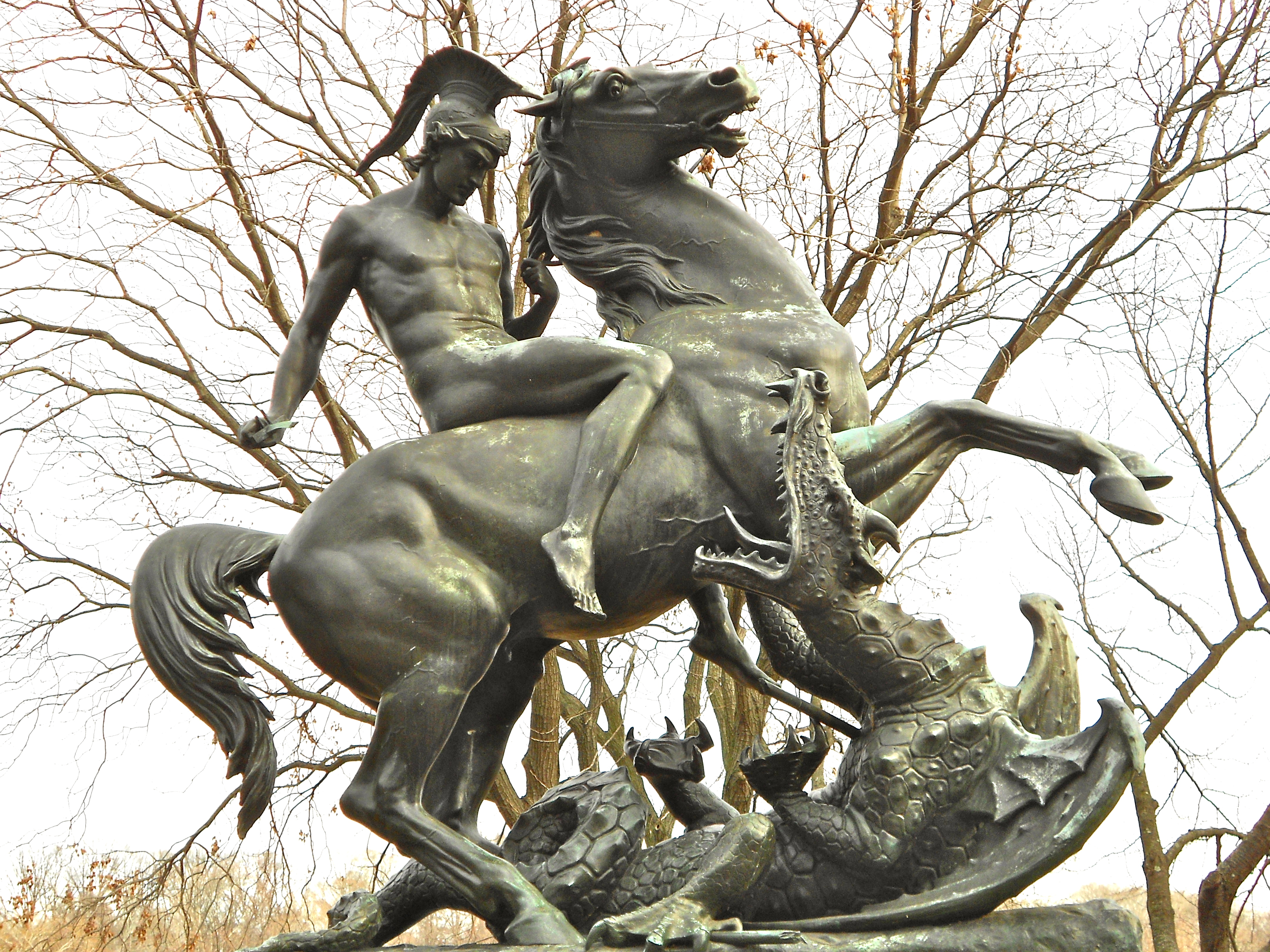
Sculpture of St. George and the Dragon from St. George's Hall, now in Fairmount Park

The seal of the society was described in the act of incorporation as a shield bordered with thirteen stars, on which is depicted Saint George slaying the dragon, with the eye of Providence beaming upon him, and on a wreath above, a young phoenix rising from the flames. The motto on the upper edge was "The Seal of St. George's Society, Philadelphia," around the bottom edge, "I was a stranger, and ye took me in," and over the crest "Add to brotherly love, charity."

The Society’s founding meeting was held at Byrne's Tavern, on Front Street, below Walnut Street. The first officers elected at the organizational meeting were: President, The Rev. Richard Peters, D.D., Rector of Christ Church; Vice-President, Mr. Robert Morris; Treasurer, Mr. Daniel Rundle; Secretary, Mr. Richard Peters, Jr.; Stewards, Mr. Richard Footman, Mr. Thomas Foxcroft, William Parr, Esq., Dr. John Kearsley; and Messenger, John Airey. The society carried out its charitable mission through the American Revolution and the War of 1812.

In 1838 the Society commissioned a Portrait of Queen Victoria from the English-born American artist Thomas Sully. In 1876, the club bought the Philadelphia mansion of tycoon Matthew Newkirk at 13th and Arch Streets, renamed it "St. George's Hall", and used it as their headquarters until the building was torn down in 1903.

In the 1900s, the society provided support to British war brides in World War I and World War II.

The Society was identical to the "Society of Englishmen, and Sons of Englishmen, Established at Philadelphia, for the Advice and Assistance of Englishmen in Distress" which met at Carpenters' Hall on St. George’s Day, April 23, 1773.

== See also ==
- St. George's Society of Baltimore
