= Independence Savings Bank =

Independence Community Bank Corp.
- Industry: Banking
- Founded: January 1, 1850; 176 years ago
- Defunct: September 9, 2006; 19 years ago
- Fate: Acquired by Santander Bank
- Headquarters: Brooklyn, New York
- Key people: Charles J. Hamm, Chairman; Alan H. Fishman, CEO & President; Frank W. Baier, CFO
- Total assets: ▲$19.083 billion (2005)
- Total equity: ▼$2.285 billion (2005)
- Number of employees: 1,974 (2005)

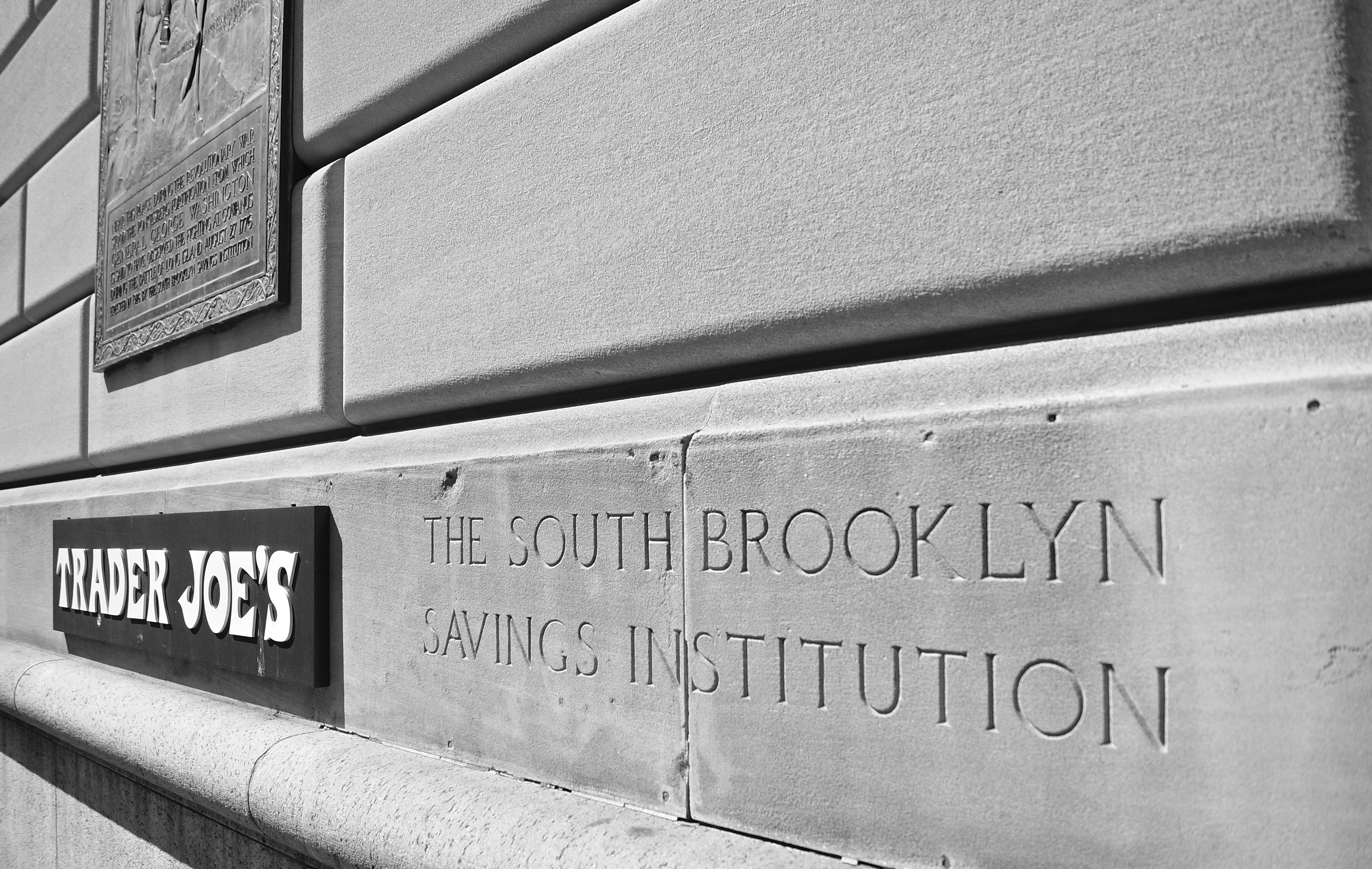
Former South Brooklyn Savings Institution building, now Trader Joe's

Independence Community Bank was a bank based in Brooklyn, New York. In 2006, the bank was acquired by Santander Bank.

== History ==
The bank was originally chartered in 1850 as South Brooklyn Savings Bank. George A. Jarvis was one of the 26 co-founders and was vice president for 33 years. James S. T. Stranahan was also a co-founder.

In 1975, the name of the bank was changed to Independence Savings Bank. The bank acquired Long Island City Savings and Loan Association in 1992. Four years later, Independence Savings Bank acquired Bay Ridge Federal Savings Bank for $144 million in cash. In 1998, the bank converted from a mutual organization to a joint-stock company and became a public company via an initial public offering. The same year, the bank changed its name to Independence Community Bank. Independence Community Bank acquired SI Bank & Trust in 2004 and was itself acquired by Santander Bank two years later.
