= Saint Andrew's Society of the State of New York =

Charitable institution

- Abbreviation: Saint Andrew's Society
- Nickname: The Scots of New York
- Formation: November 19, 1756
- Type: 501(c)3
- Purpose: Helping Scots in need
- Headquarters: 150 East 55th Street
- Location: New York City
- Members: By application
- President: John H. Blankley
- Website: standrewsny.org

The Saint Andrew's Society of the State of New York is the oldest charitable institution in the state of New York and is focused on helping Scots in the New York community with the motto Charity, Fellowship, Scholarship.

== History ==
Originally named the Saint Andrew's Society, the organization was founded in 1756 by Scottish founders in New York City who were looking to "relieve the distressed." It was named for the patron saint of Scotland, Saint Andrew. Past presidents of the society include US Declaration of Independence signer Philip Livingston (its first president), William Alexander (the "Earl of Stirling"), Andrew Carnegie and Ward Melville (Note: The history of the Society from 1774 to 1784, during the Revolutionary War, is unknown.). Past members include Alexander Hamilton, Lewis Morris, the Rev. John Witherspoon, the Rev. Dr. David H. C. Read and John Stewart Kennedy.

During the American Revolutionary War, member sentiment was split between Tory and Patriot. At a reorganizational meeting after 1784, the society was retitled under its current name.

In 1897, the organization revised its constitution to expand eligibility for membership to lineal descendants of a Scot, not just the son or grandson of a Scot.

In 1966, more than 800 members and guests honored Saint Andrew with its 210th anniversary dinner at the Waldorf Astoria hotel in Manhattan. The dinner continues today, with more than 200 people in attendance for the 2023 event, which honored Scottish actress and Downton Abbey star Phyllis Logan with the organization's Mark Twain Award. (Also known as the "Sammy," the award honors leaders in their fields who have had a significant and positive impact on the Scots community around the world.)

In 1993, the Society had 980 members.

In 2010, the constitution was again revised, allowing women Society membership, with Margaret "Peggy" Macmillan the first woman admitted.

=== Reason & Genesis for Creation ===
According to organization president Richard Porter, "By the middle of the 18th century, there were more than 100,000 Scots and people of Scottish descent in Colonial America. From farmers and laborers to the younger sons of the nobility, Scots came from all parts of their native country, as well as Ulster, seeking opportunities in the New World. In cities ranging from Savannah in the South, in 1750, to Boston in the North, as early as 1657, Scots organized philanthropic and social groups to aid fellow Scots in need, building on the tradition of the church poor box. A secondary but important purpose was to provide social opportunities and business connections among the Scots. The first such group in New York was established as the Scots Society of New-York in 1744, 'from a compassionate Concern and Affection to their indigent countrymen.' The Society folded around 1753, but the need for a philanthropy to assist Scots in need, particularly widows and orphans, continued unabated. On November 19, 1756, a group of 45 men established The Saint Andrew’s Society of New York in the Province of New York, 'for the relief of Natives of Scotland and their Descendants who might be in Want or Distress, and to promote Social Intercourse among its members.' Alms were not to be given to those whose indigence was the result of drunkenness."

== Present day ==
The society provides for needy Scots in New York City via its almoners program and has a scholarship program that allows two Scots to attend graduate school in the USA and three American students of Scottish lineage to attend graduate school at a Scottish institution of higher learning.

Social events for the Society include the Tartan Day parade in April and an annual banquet in November. The Society sponsors a Kirkin' o' the Tartan service during Tartan Week in April of each year. The Society offices are located on East 55th Street in Manhattan, which houses a collection of books about Scotland.

== See also ==
- Saint Andrew's Society
- St. Andrew's Society of Montreal
- St. George Society of Philadelphia
- St. George's Society of Baltimore
