= Among the Sierra Nevada, California =

1868 painting by Albert Bierstadt

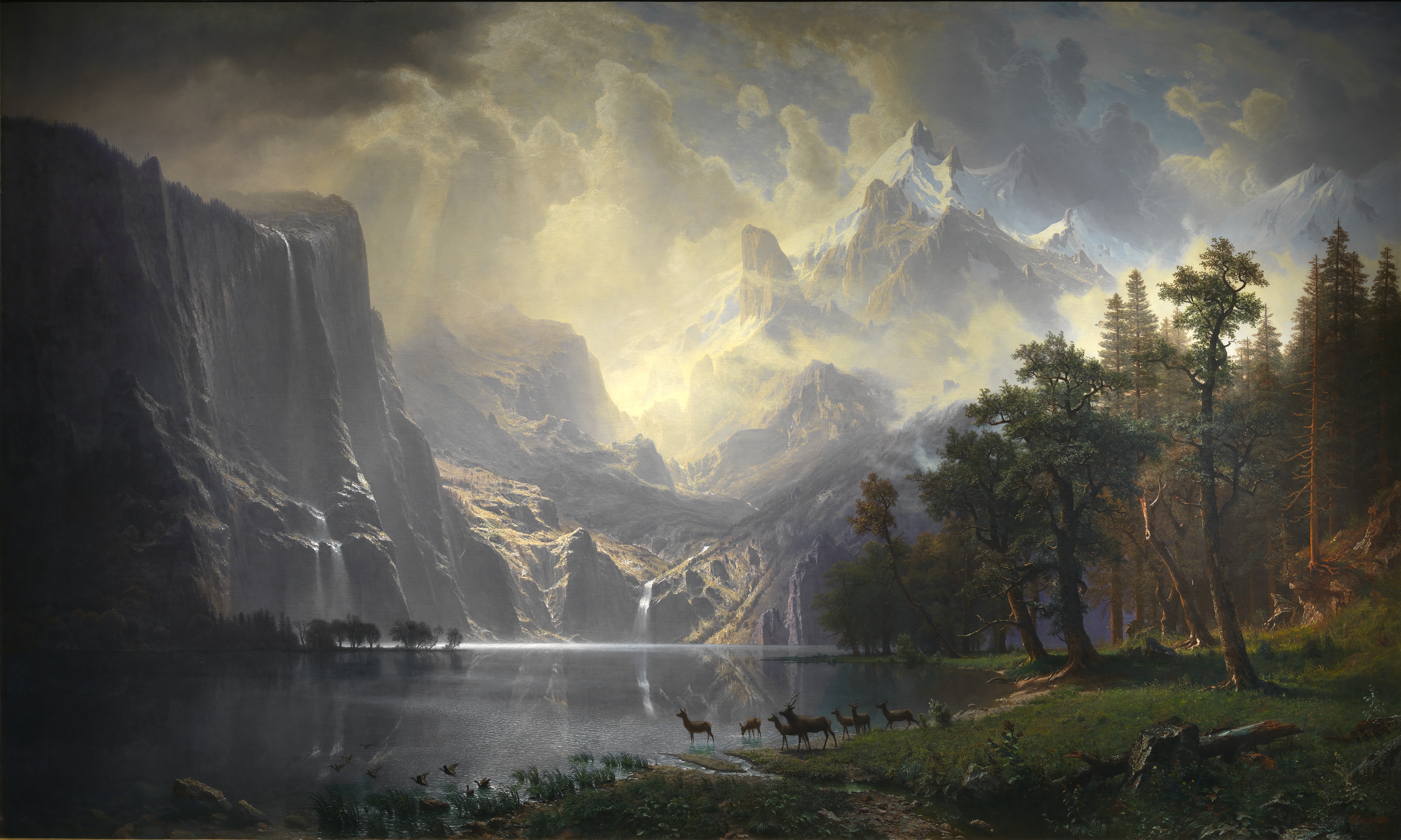
- Artist: Albert Bierstadt
- Year: 1868
- Medium: Oil on canvas
- Dimensions: 180 cm × 305.12 cm (72 in × 120.125 in)
- Location: Smithsonian American Art Museum, Washington, D.C.

Among the Sierra Nevada, California (also known as Among the Sierra Nevada Mountains) is an 1868 oil-on-canvas painting by German-American artist Albert Bierstadt which depicts a landscape scene of the Sierra Nevada mountain range in California. Created at his studio in Rome, the painting was exhibited throughout Europe, creating interest in immigration to the United States. Measuring 72 by 120 1/8 inches (183 by 305 cm), the painting is a centerpiece of the 19th-century landscape collection at the Smithsonian American Art Museum in Washington, D.C.

== Background ==
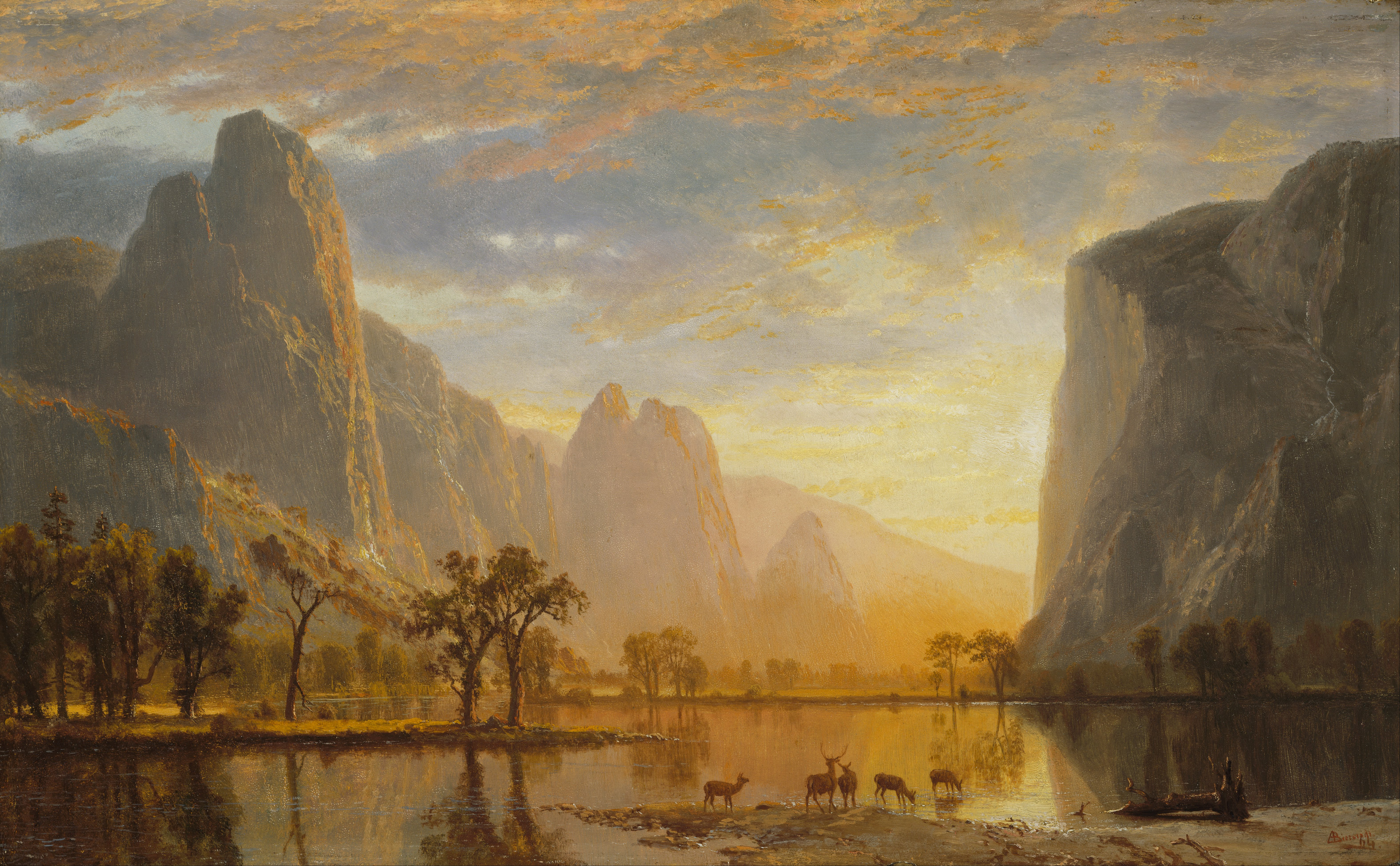
Bierstadt's Valley of the Yosemite (1864)

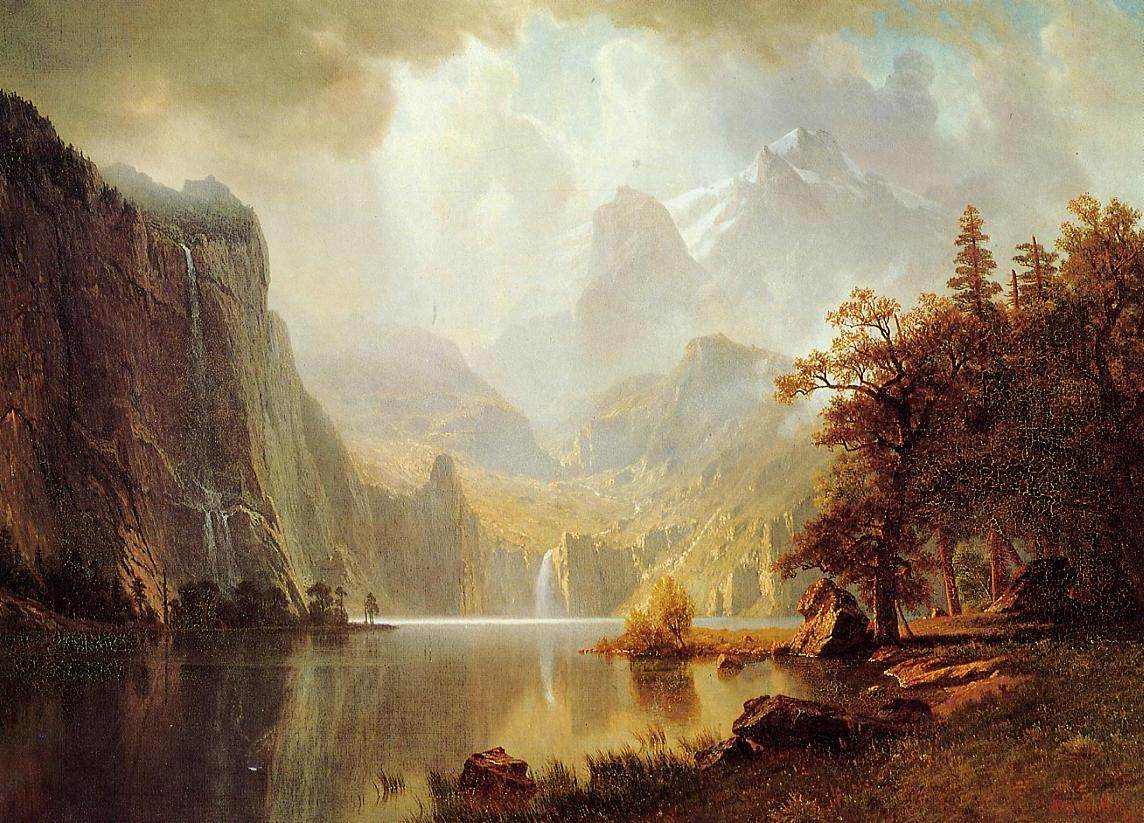
Bierstadt's In the Mountains (1867)

Albert Bierstadt (1830–1902) immigrated from Germany to New Bedford, Massachusetts, as an infant. He later went back to Germany to study art at the Düsseldorf Academy before returning to the United States and becoming part of the Hudson River School. After the gold rush to California, Bierstadt was part of an 1859 survey expedition, led by Frederick W. Lander, to scout a route for a railroad across the Rockies. Sponsored by the Union Pacific Railroad, over the next decade, he made several more such trips during which he painted scenes of California with the goal of attracting visitors and investors to the region. It was on such a journey to the Sierra Nevada in 1863 that Bierstadt may have seen what he later depicted in Among the Sierra Nevada.

== Description ==
Among the Sierra Nevada was created in Rome in winter 1867–68, four years after Bierstadt's trip to the Sierra Nevada. The painting measures 72 by 120 1/8 inches (183 by 305 cm) and has an elaborate frame measuring 96 1/4 by 144 3/8 by 7 1/4 inches (244 by 367 by 18 cm).

The painting depicts rugged mountains on the left and background that reach out to a bright sky with the Sun's rays peeking through the clouds. The mountains look over a calm lake with a group of elk and waterfowl on its edge and is bordered by trees on the right side of the painting. On the viewer's left in the water under the shadow of the rocks, there is a single trout, only visible when viewed very closely.

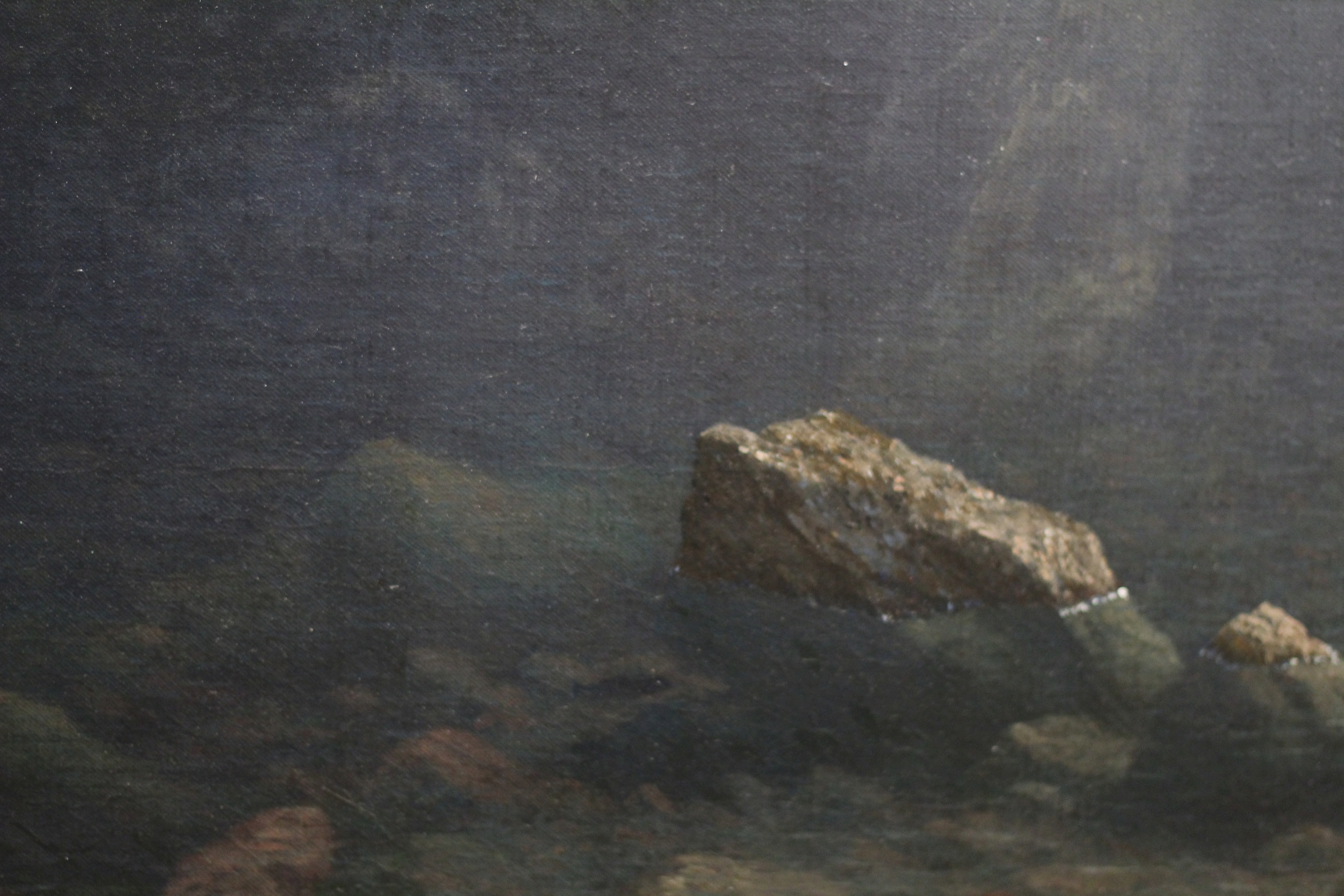

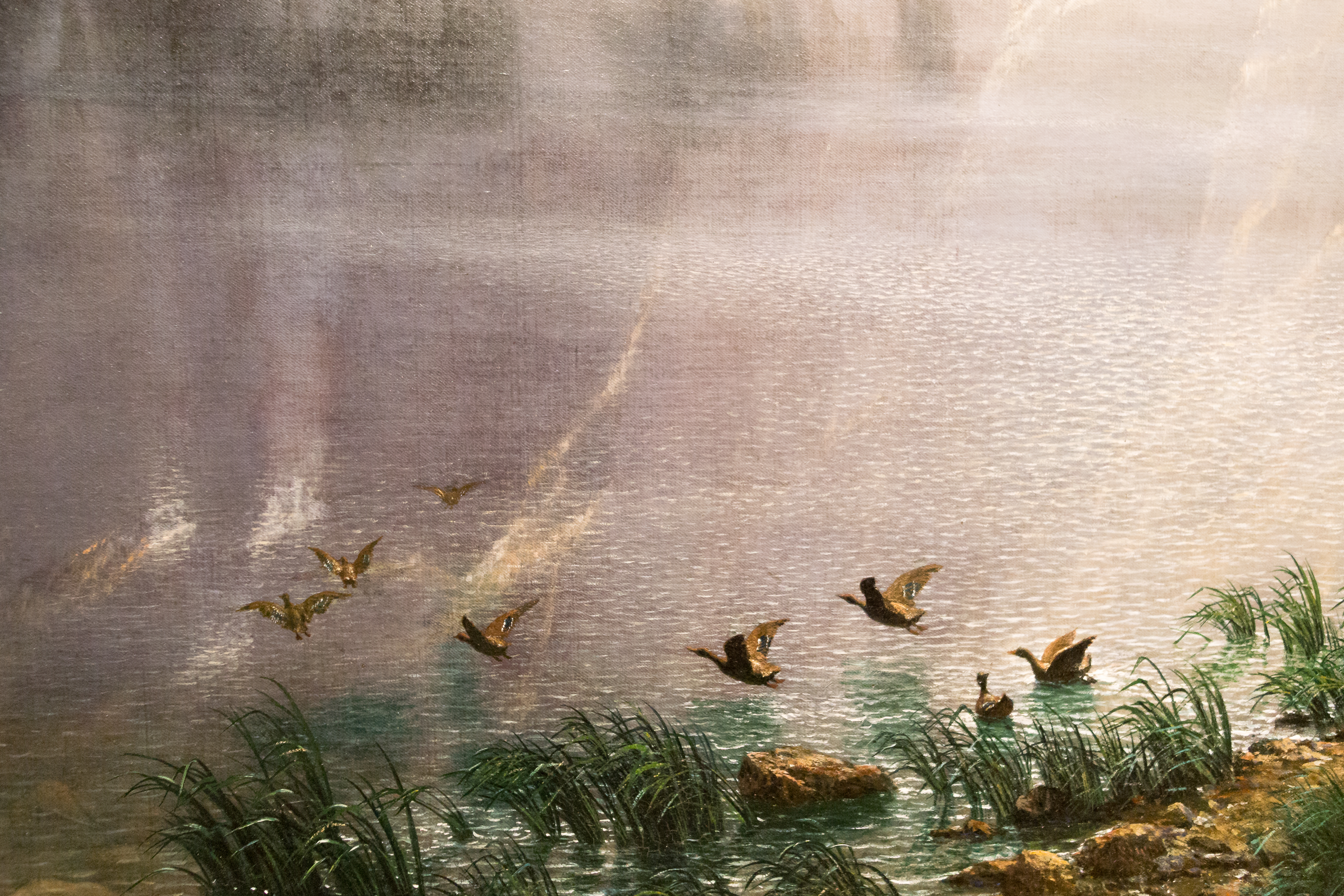

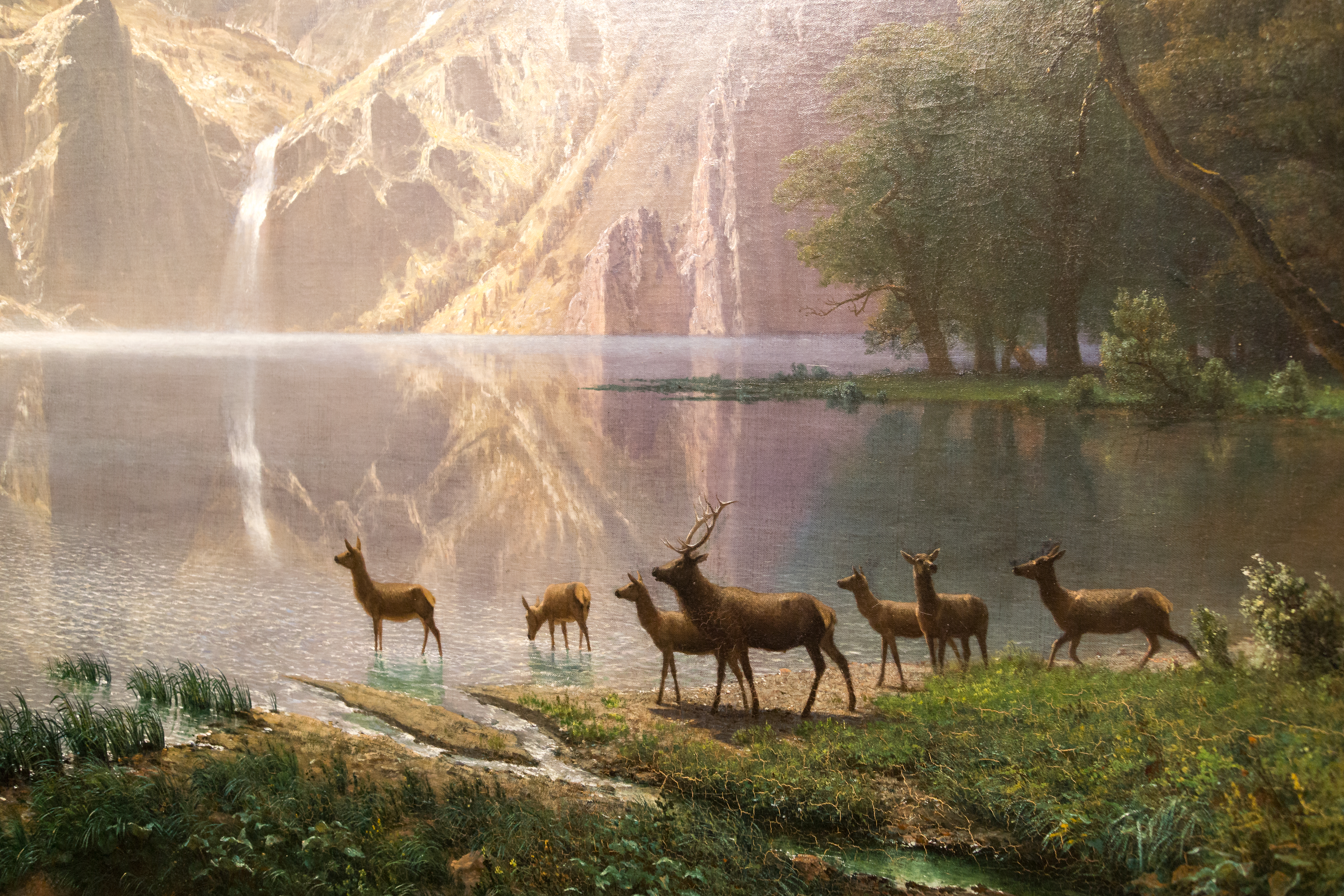

== Exhibition and provenance ==
The painting was first shown in London the summer after its creation – along with two other works by the artist. It was then shown at the Royal Academy in Berlin, where it earned a gold medal. It was later exhibited in Paris, Moscow and Saint Petersburg. A consummate promoter of his own work, Bierstadt presumably hoped to raise the price of the piece by exhibiting it around Europe. He would plant stories in newspapers and sell tickets to his exhibitions, turning the unveiling of his work into a theatrical event.

Bierstadt took the painting to the United States in 1869 and sold it to Alvin Adams, an art collector in Boston. Adams had also owned another Bierstadt piece, Lake Lucerne (1858). In 1873, Among the Sierra Nevada was acquired by William Brown Dinsmore (1810–1888), a businessman who wanted it for his country villa Locusts on Hudson in Dutchess County, New York. It passed down to his great-granddaughter, Helen Huntington Hull. Locusts on Hudson was demolished, and Hull had a new home built on the property in 1941. As part of the interior decoration, she had Among the Sierra Nevada removed from its frame and glued to an interior wall in the new house.

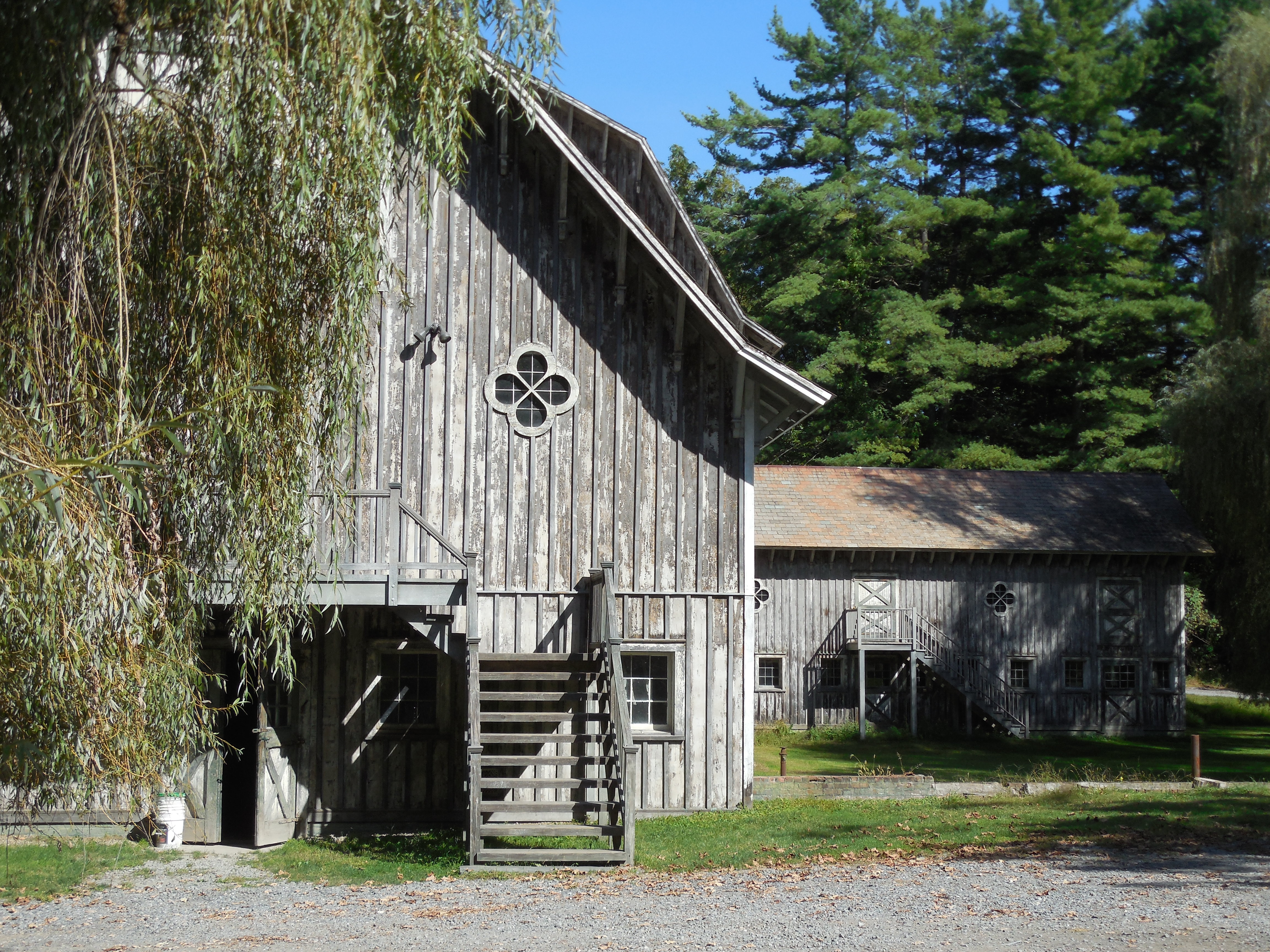
One of the barns of the Locusts on Hudson estate

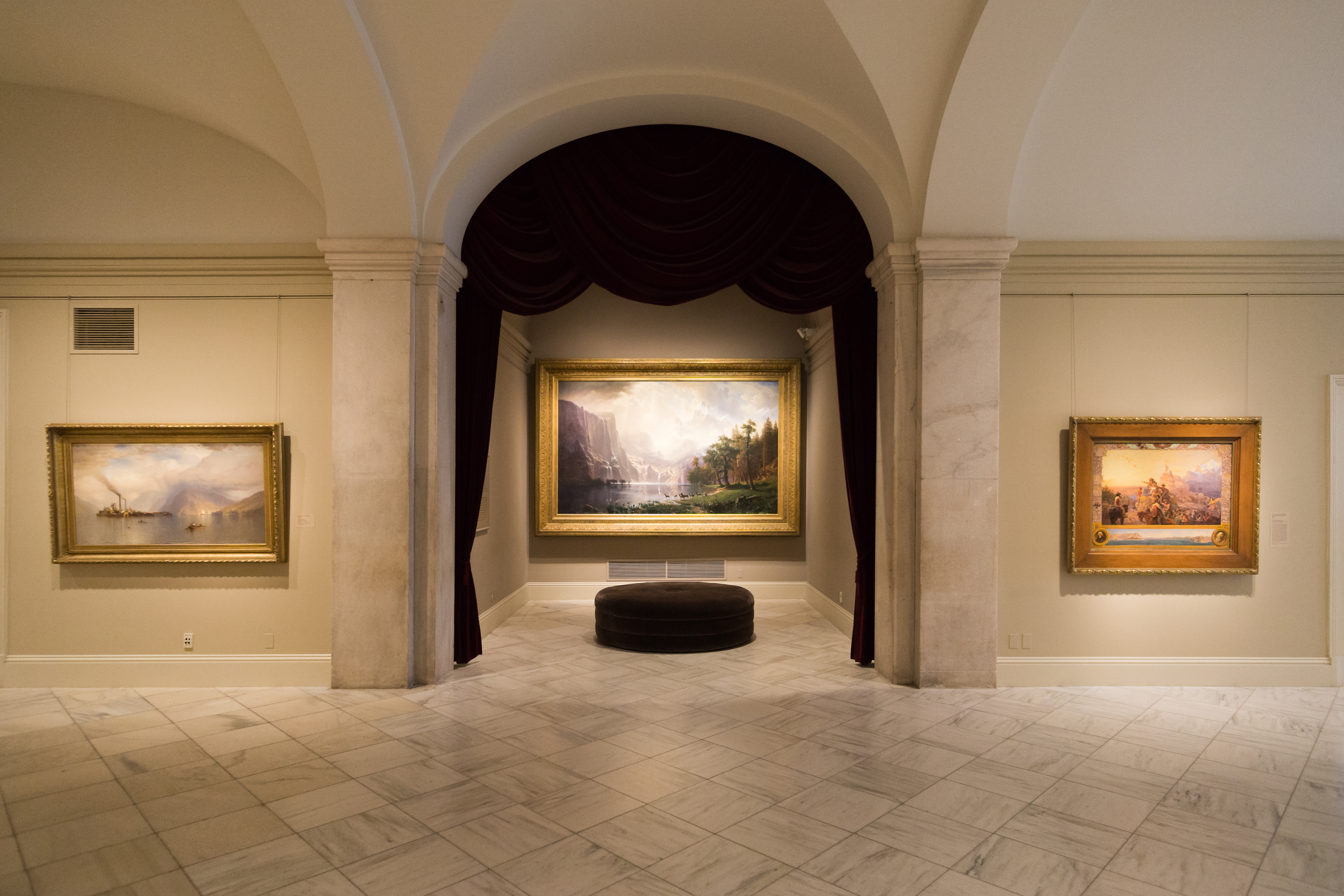
The painting on exhibit at the Smithsonian American Art Museum

Hull died in 1976 leaving the painting as a bequest to the Smithsonian Institution. William Truettner, a curator for the Smithsonian, was sent to Hull's house to retrieve the painting and also found the original ornate gilded frame—in four pieces but in good condition—in a barn on the property. Conservators spent about 600 hours to clean the painting, including the glue from the back of the canvas, before it was remounted on the original frame. In 1985, the painting became a centerpiece of the 19th-century landscape collection at Smithsonian American Art Museum.

== See also ==
- List of works by Albert Bierstadt
