= George Grantham Bain =

American photographer and journalist (1865–1944)

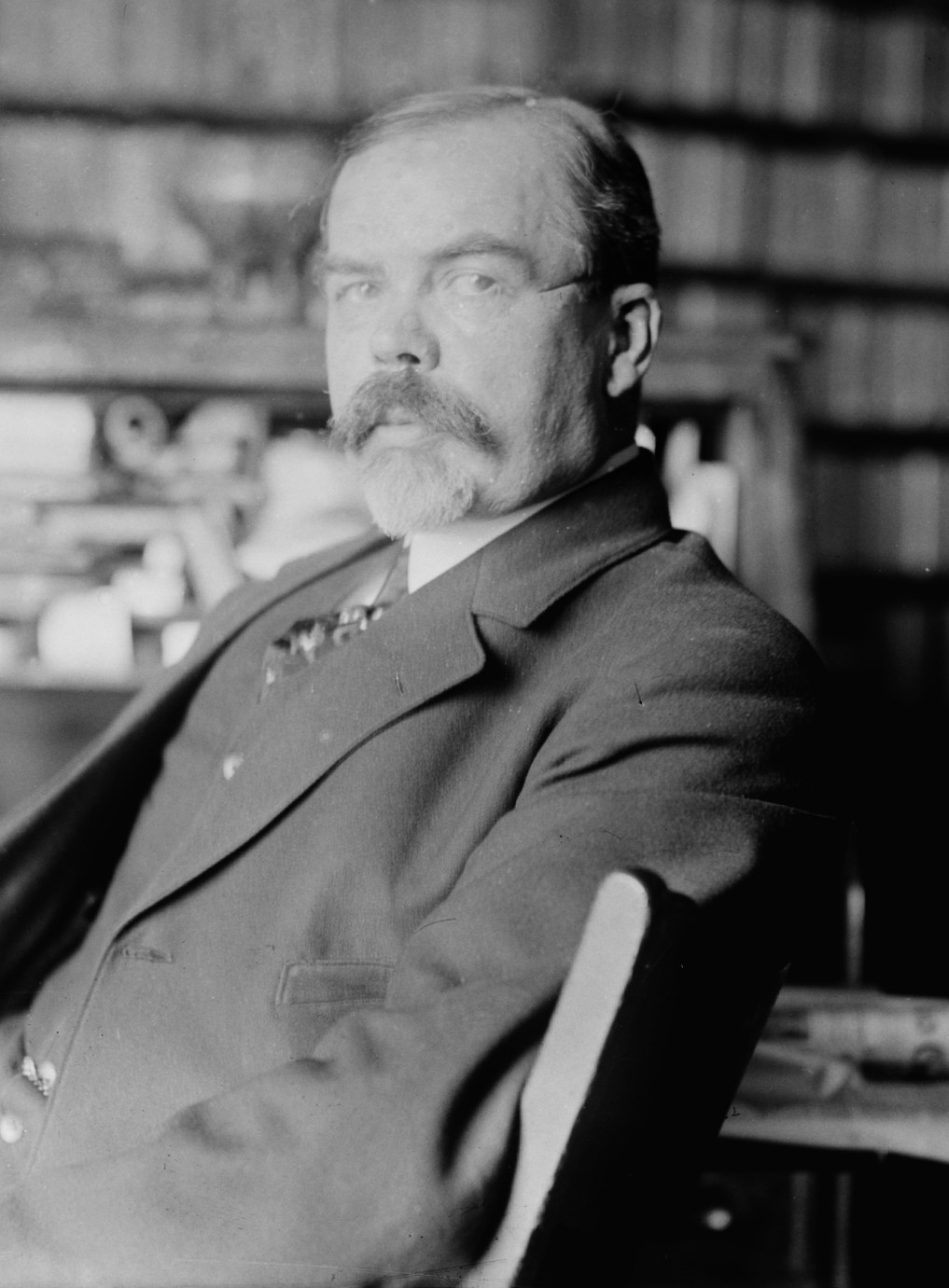
- Bain ca. 1910–1915
- Born: January 7, 1865; Chicago, Illinois, U.S.
- Died: April 20, 1944 (aged 79); Bellevue Hospital, New York City, U.S.
- Known for: "Father of foreign photographic news"
- Parent(s): George Bain; Clara Mather

George Grantham Bain (January 7, 1865 – April 20, 1944) was an American photographer. He was known as "the father of foreign photographic news".

== Biography ==
He was born in Chicago, Illinois, on January 7, 1865, to George Bain and Clara Mather. His family moved from Chicago to St. Louis, Missouri. He attended Saint Louis University as an undergraduate to study chemistry, and later attained a law degree from the same institution.

After graduation, Bain became a reporter at the St. Louis Globe-Democrat. The following year he moved to the St. Louis Post-Dispatch, where he became the Washington, D.C. correspondent. He worked for United Press before he started the Bain News Service in 1898.

He died at age 79, on April 20, 1944, at Bellevue Hospital in Manhattan.

== George Grantham Bain Collection ==
The George Grantham Bain Collection at the Library of Congress Prints and Photographs Division comprises approximately 40,000 glass plate negatives and 50,000 photographic prints. Most are scanned and have been made available online. Most date from the 1900s to the mid-1920s, but some are as early as the 1860s, and some as late as the 1930s.

The majority of Bain's images depict events in New York City, but he also copied extant images of worldwide events for news distribution purposes. "The Bain picture files richly document local sports events, theater, celebrities, crime, strikes, disasters, political activities including the woman suffrage campaign, conventions and public celebrations", the library notes.

There are no known copyright restrictions on the photographs in the Collection, although some of Bain's most important images had historically been marked with a copyright notice to prevent unauthorized distribution.

== Gallery ==
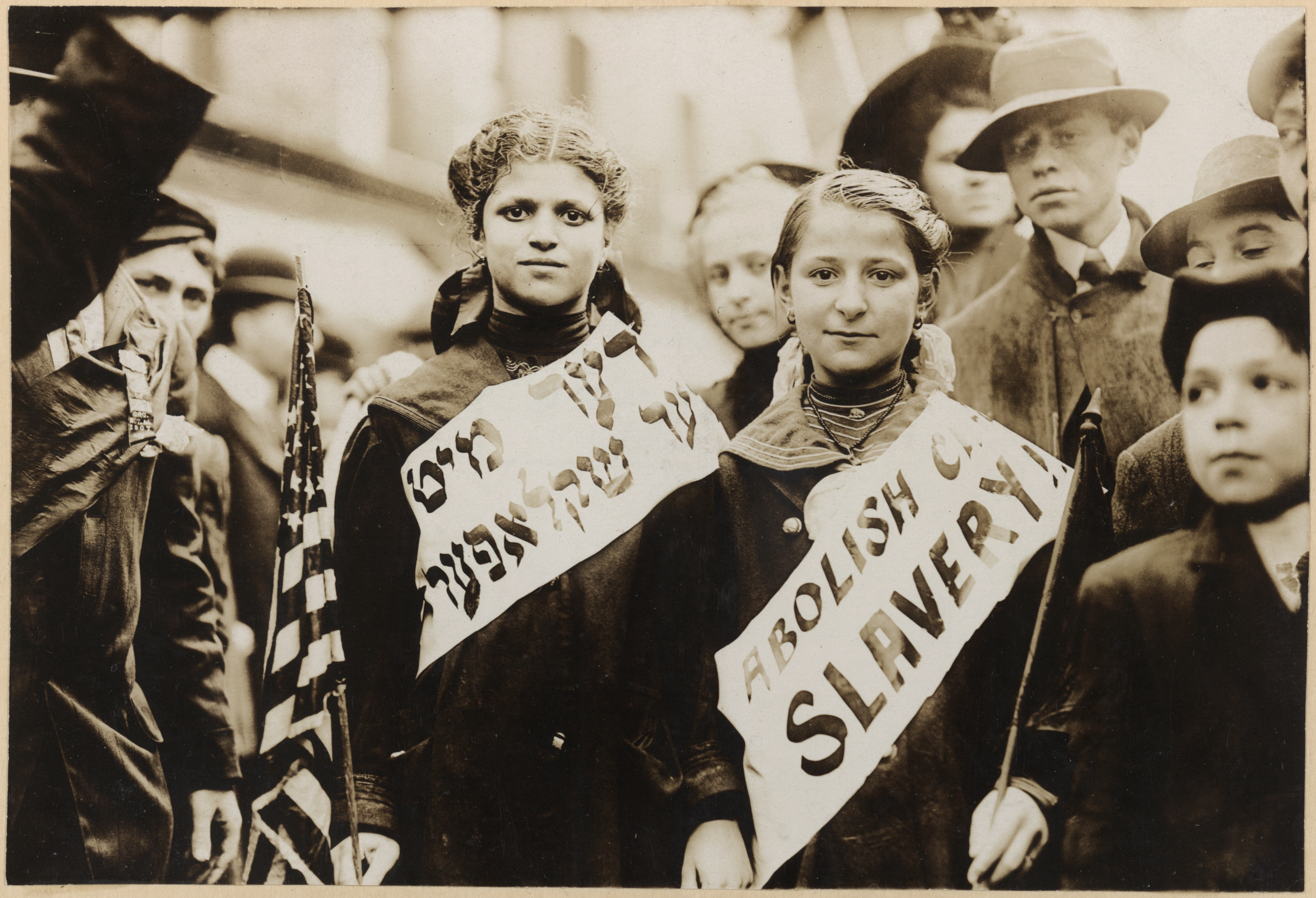
Two girls wearing banners bearing the slogan "ABOLISH CH[ILD] SLAVERY!!" in English and Yiddish, 1909

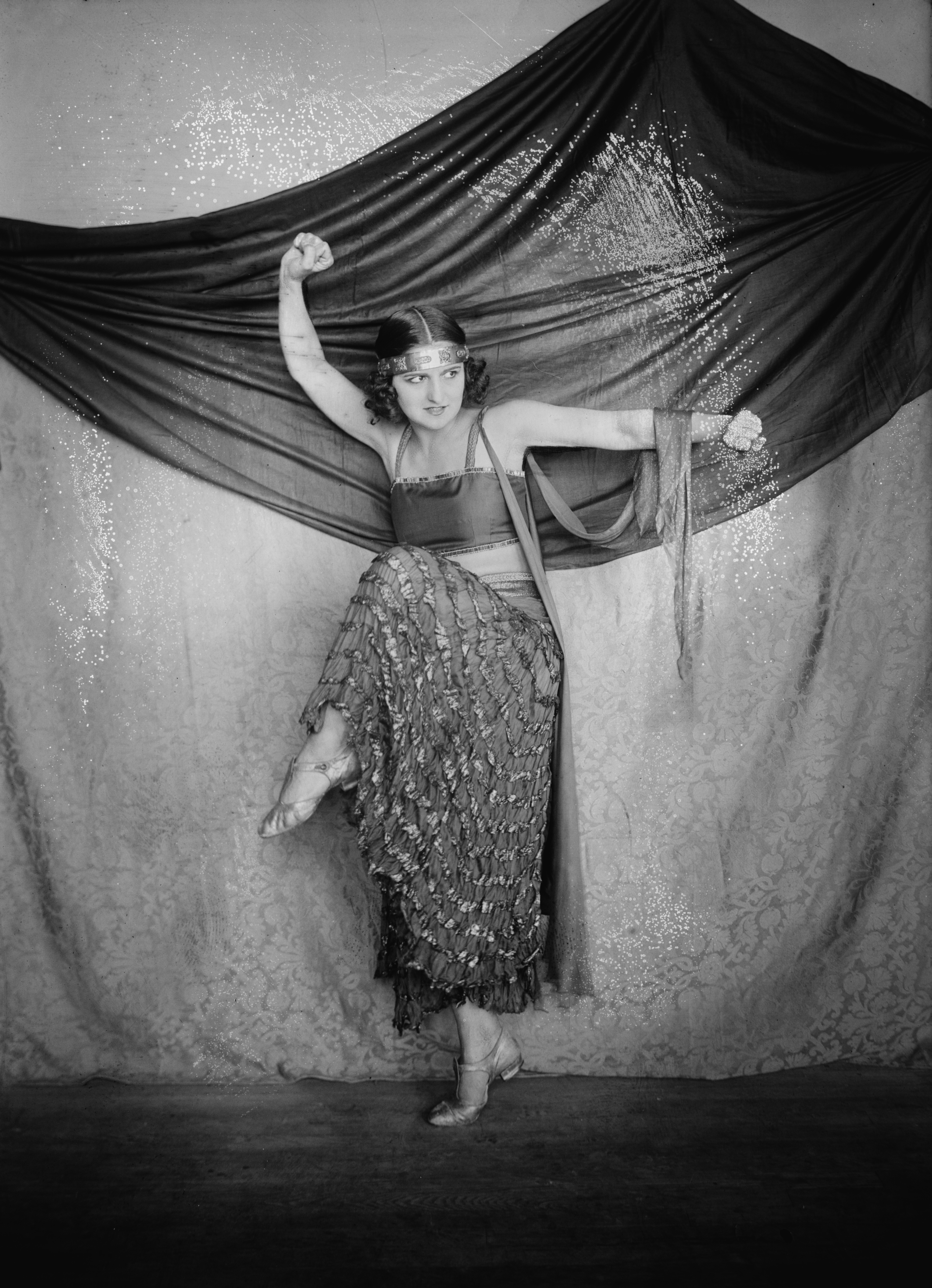
Albertina Rasch, gypsy dance, 1915

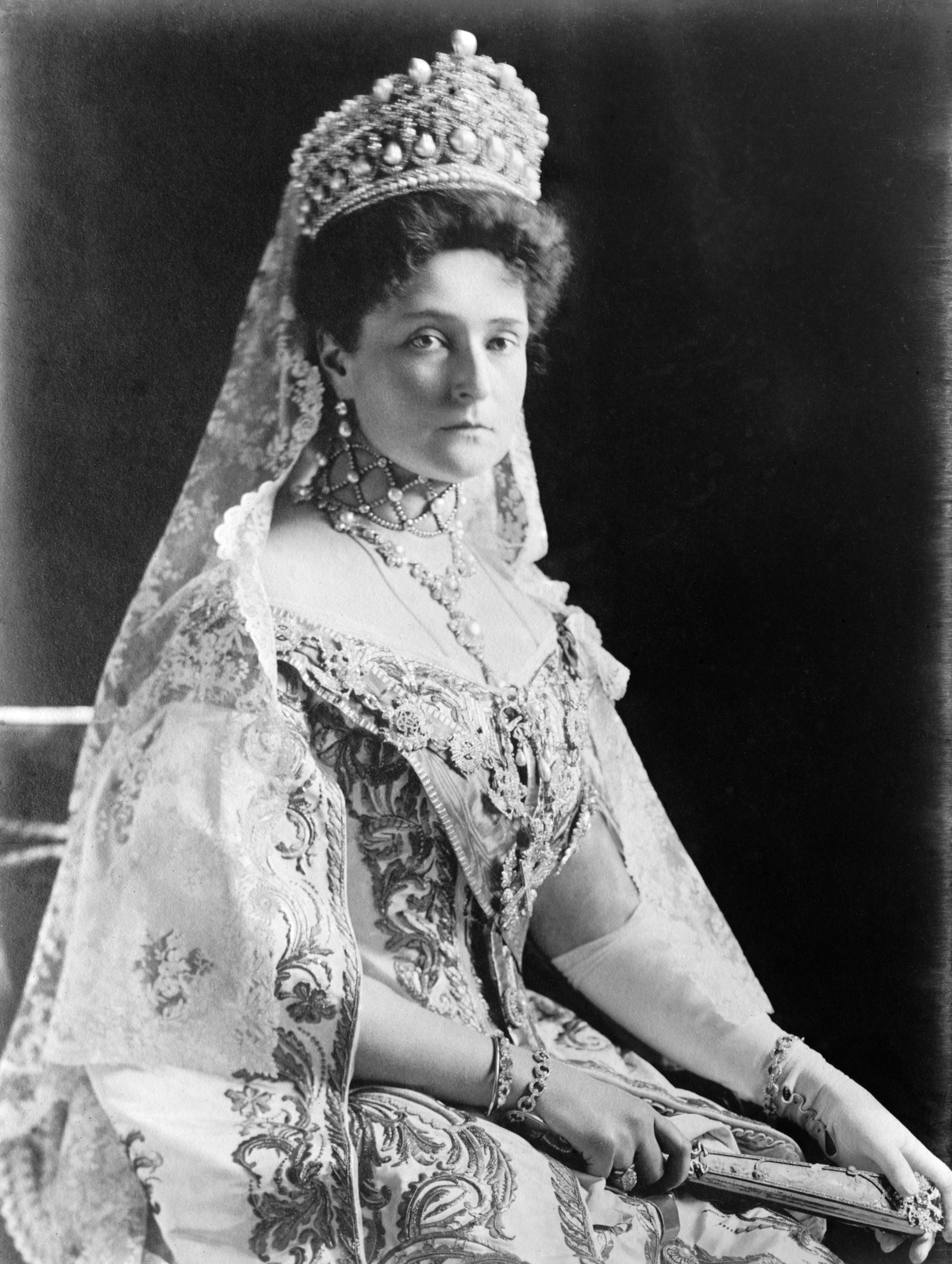
Alexandra Fyodorovna

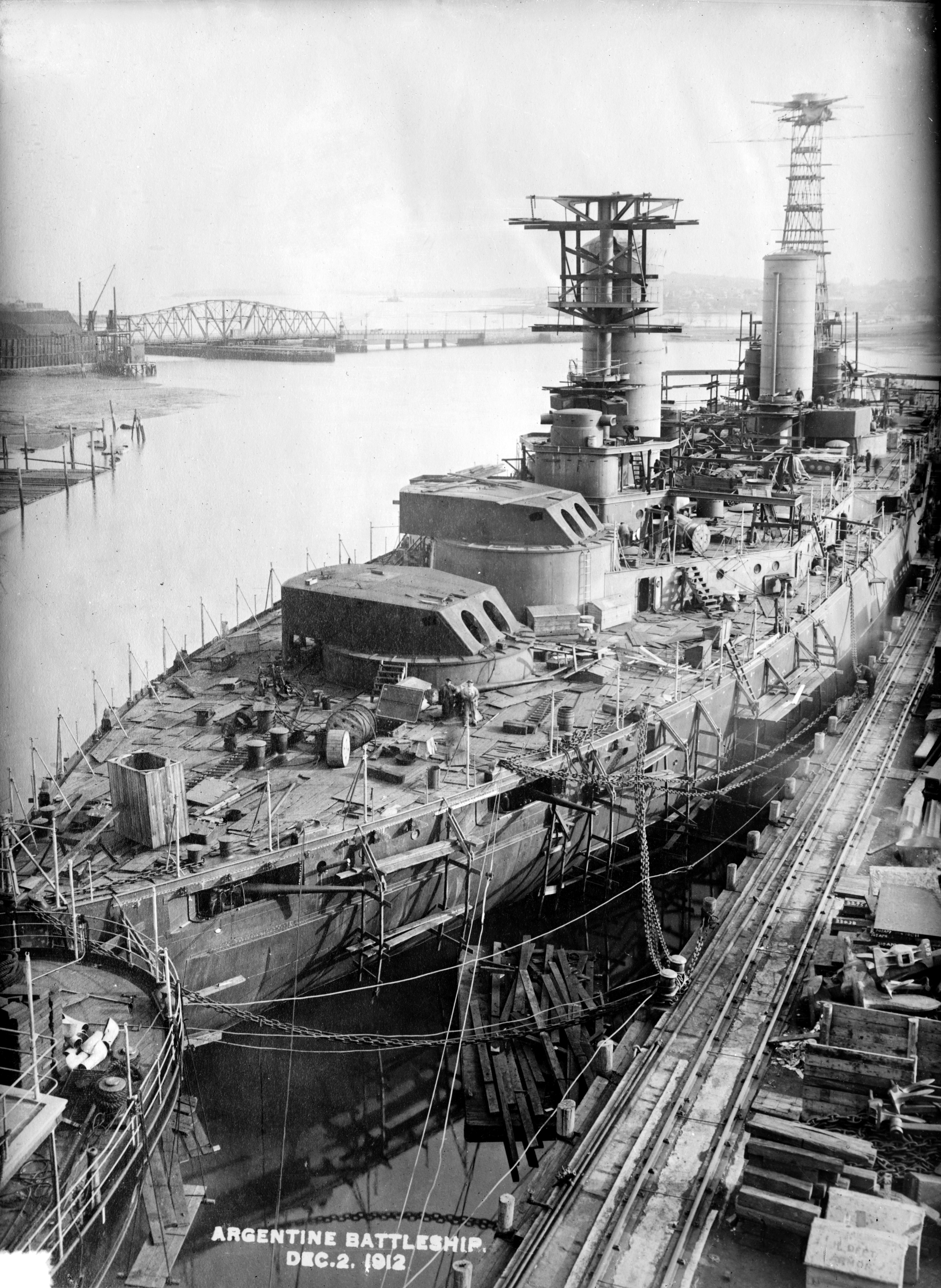
Argentine Rivadavia-class battleship, 1912

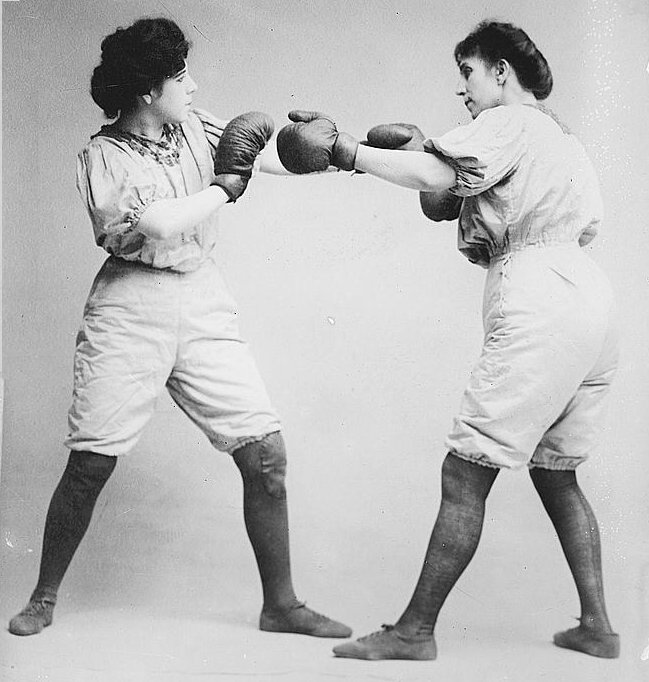
The "Bennett Sisters" boxing

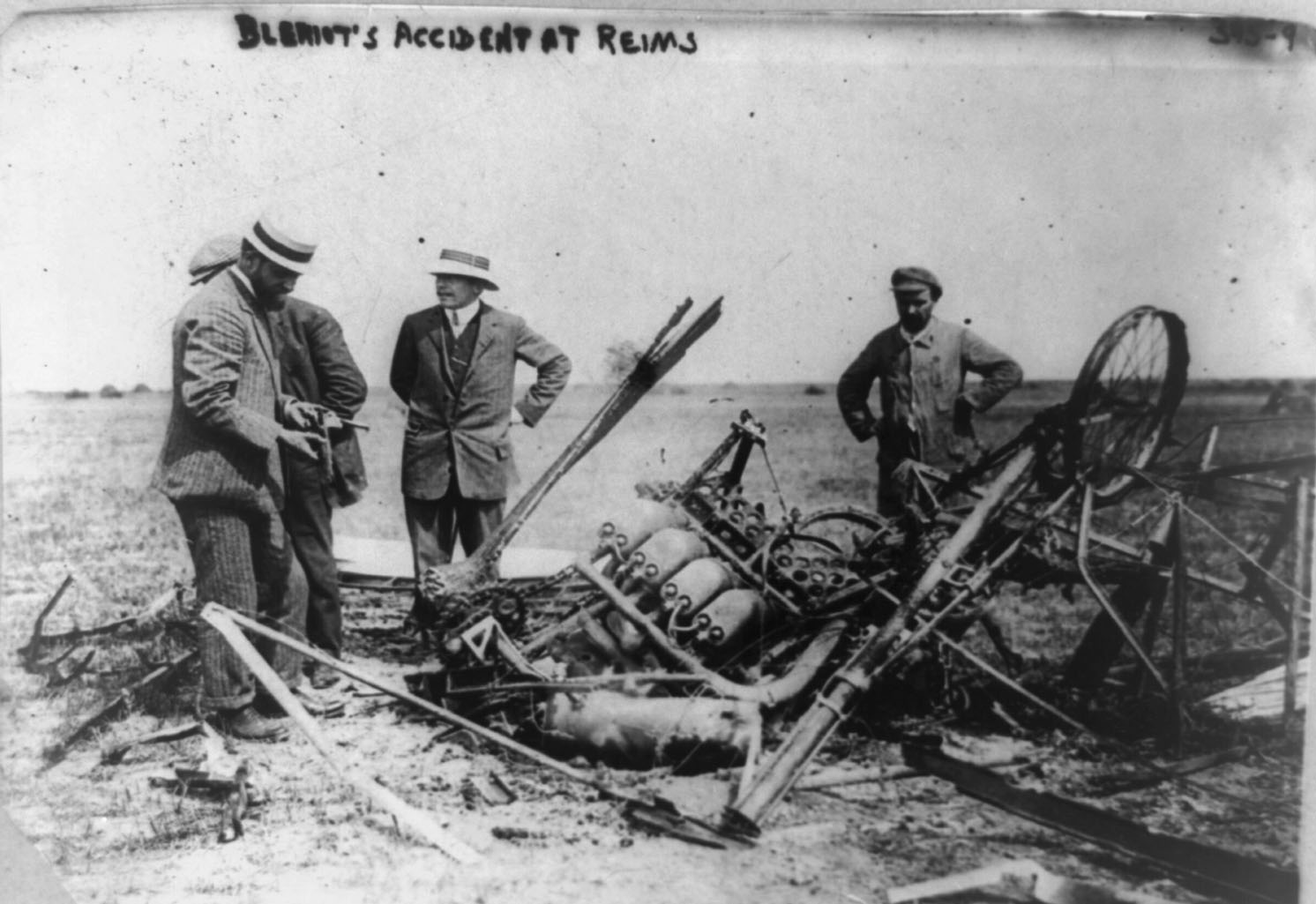
Four men with wreckage of Blériot's plane at Reims, 1909

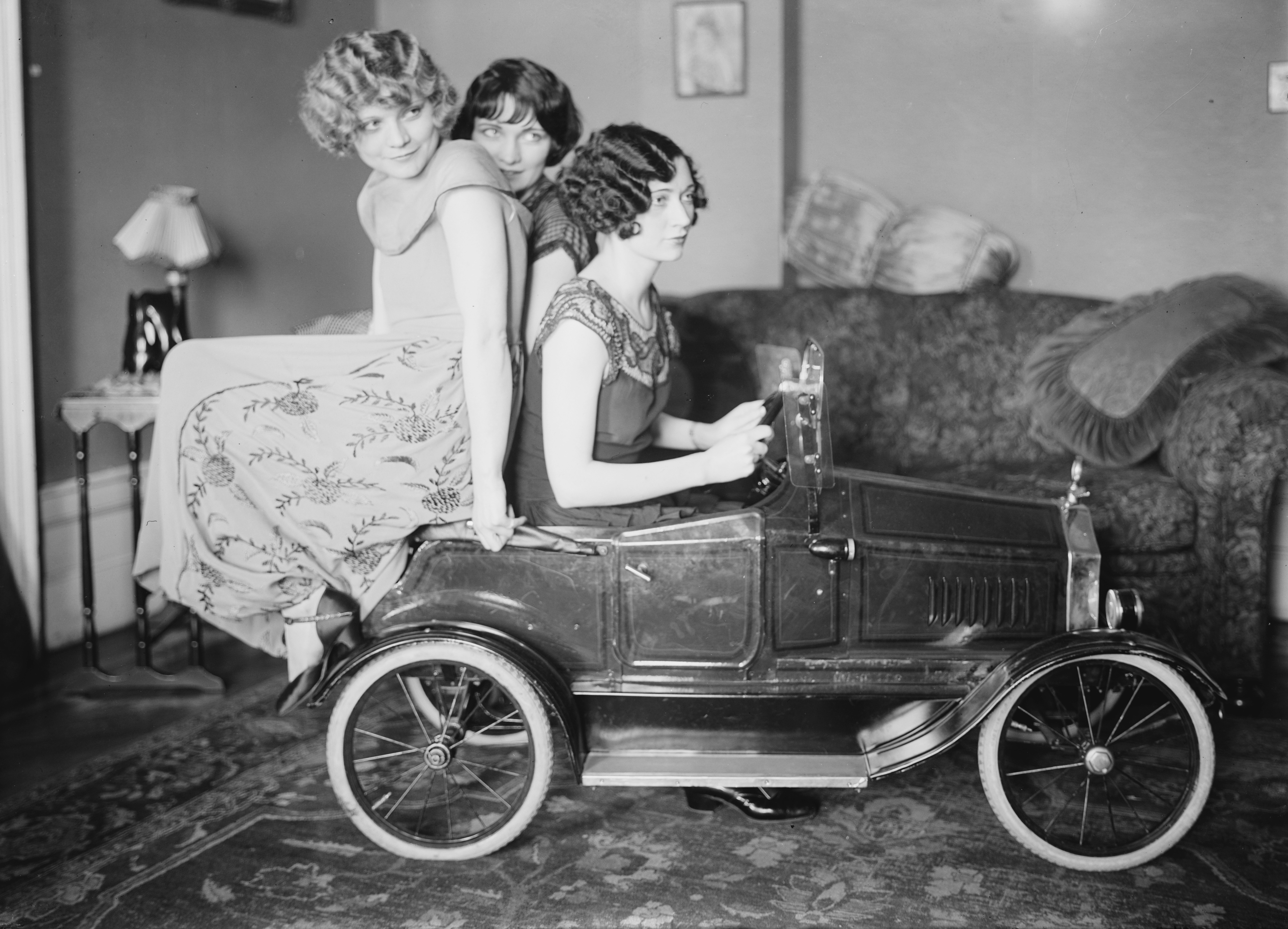
The Brox Sisters, posed with toy car. Left to right: Loryane, Bobbe, Patricia

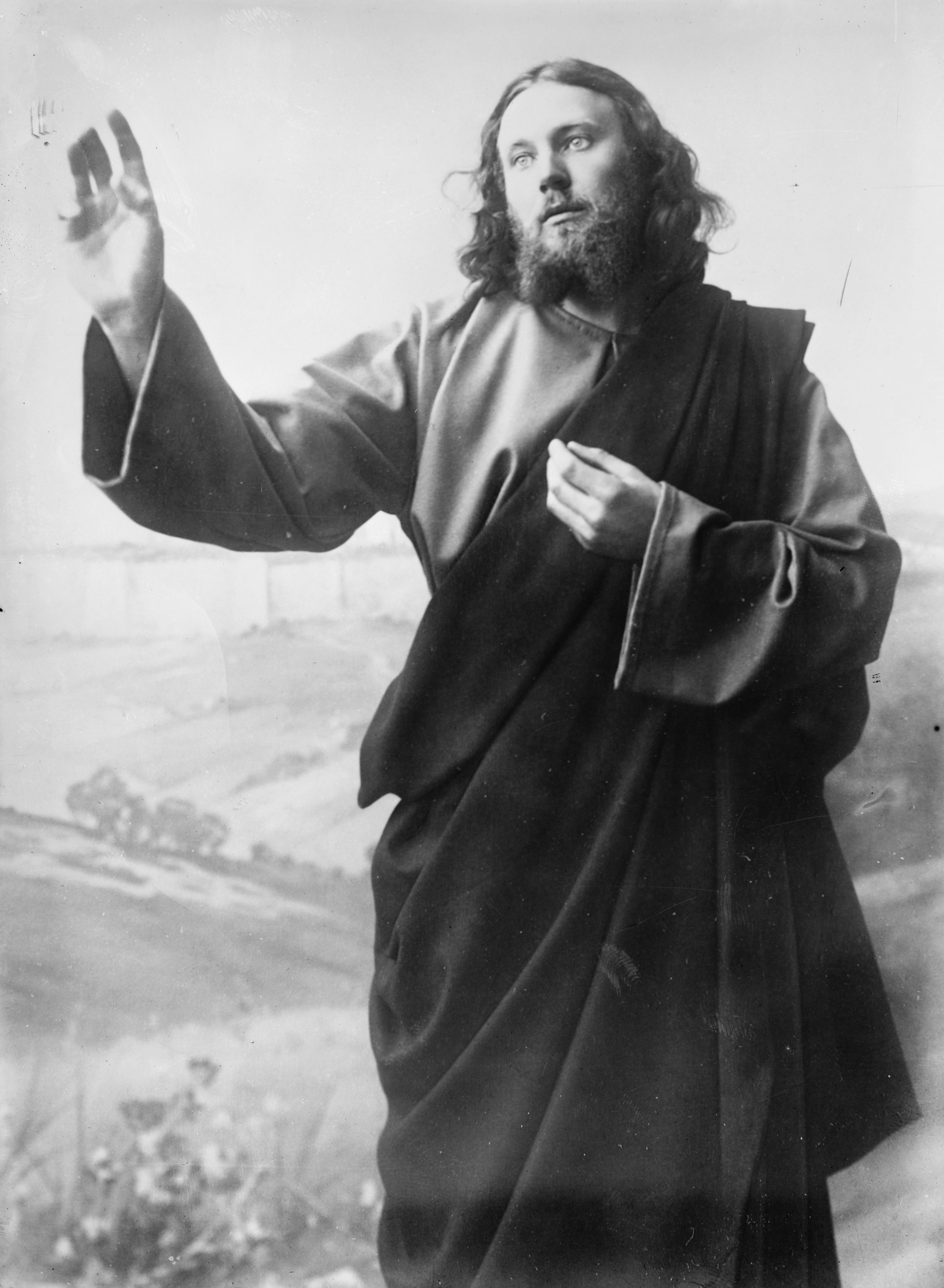
Anton Lang as Christ, at the Oberammergau Passion Play, 1900

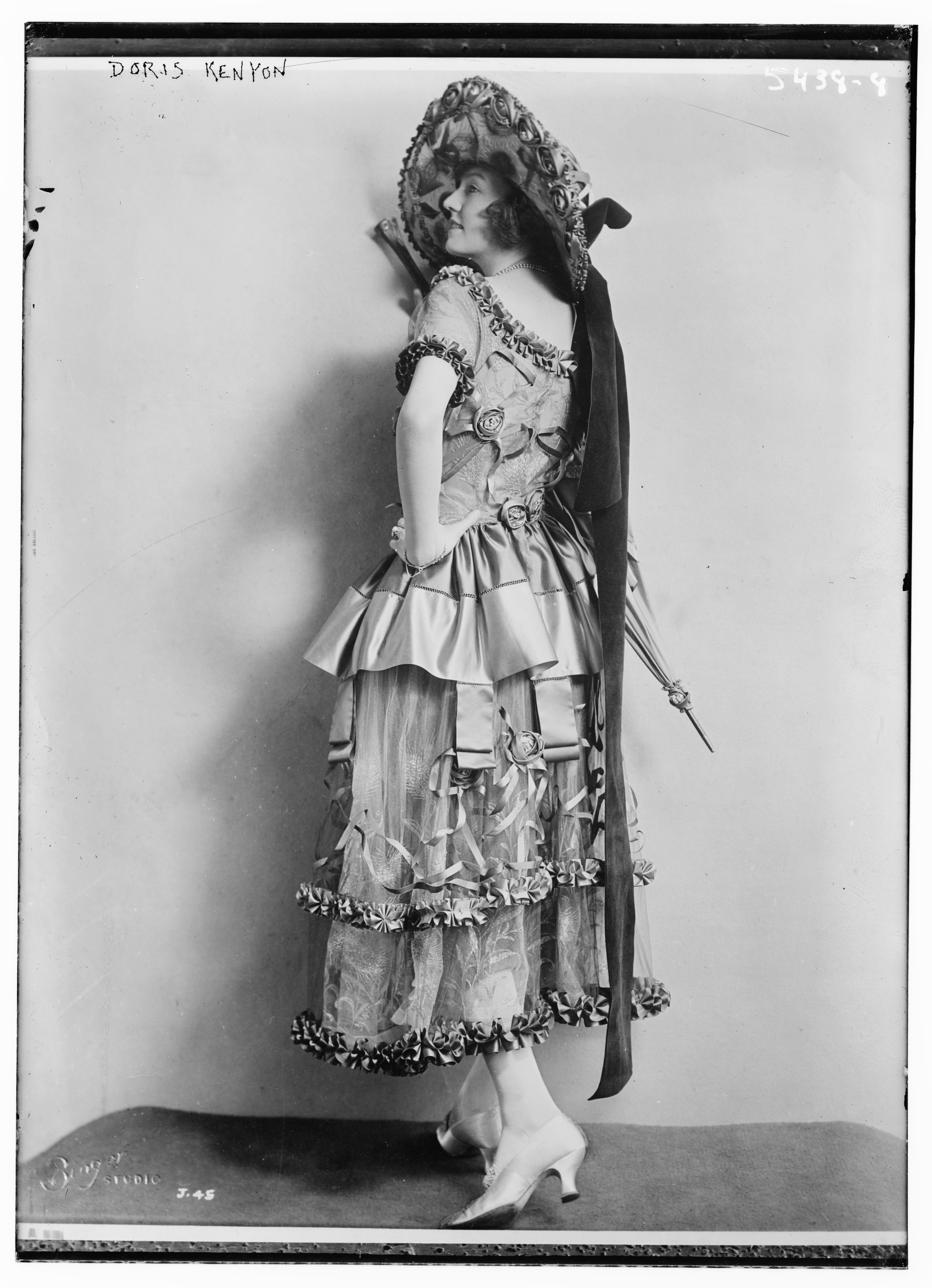
Doris Kenyon

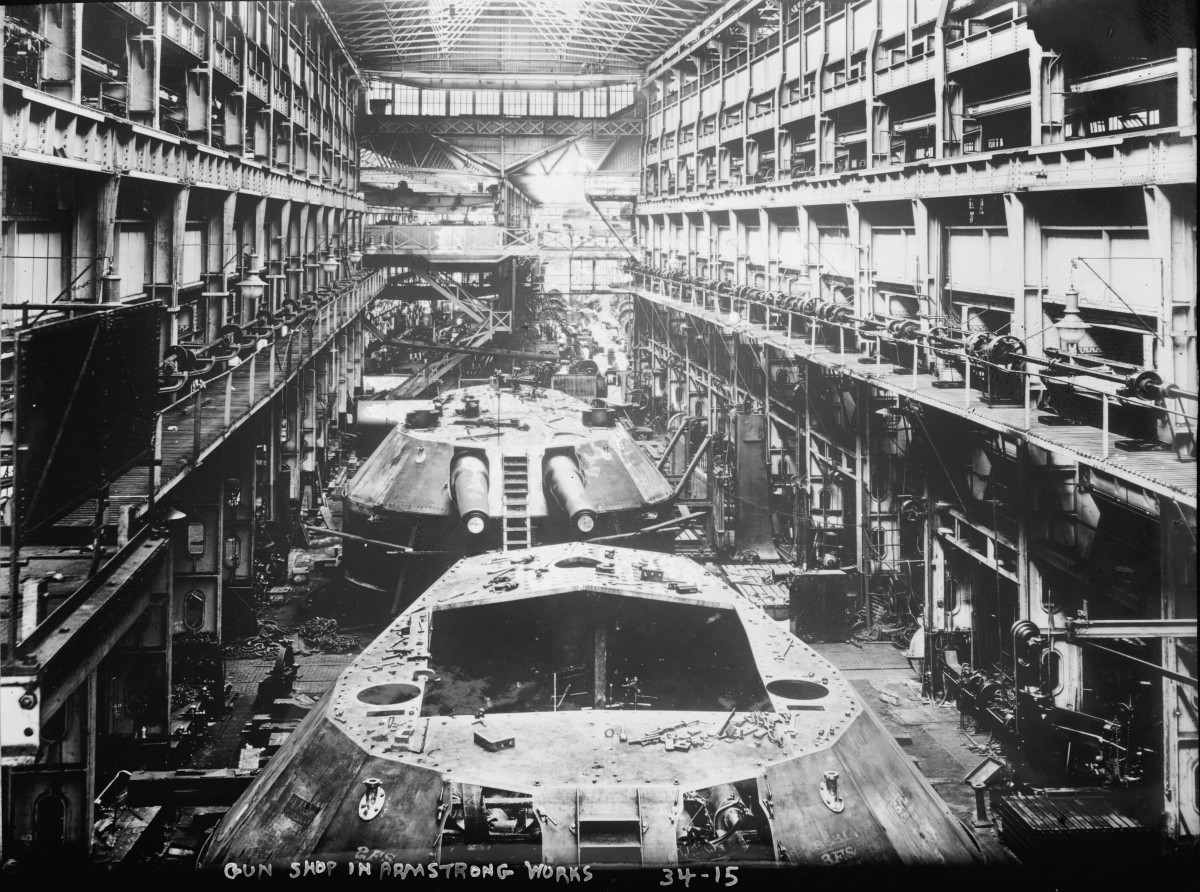
The gun shop at Armstrong Works, 1902–1903

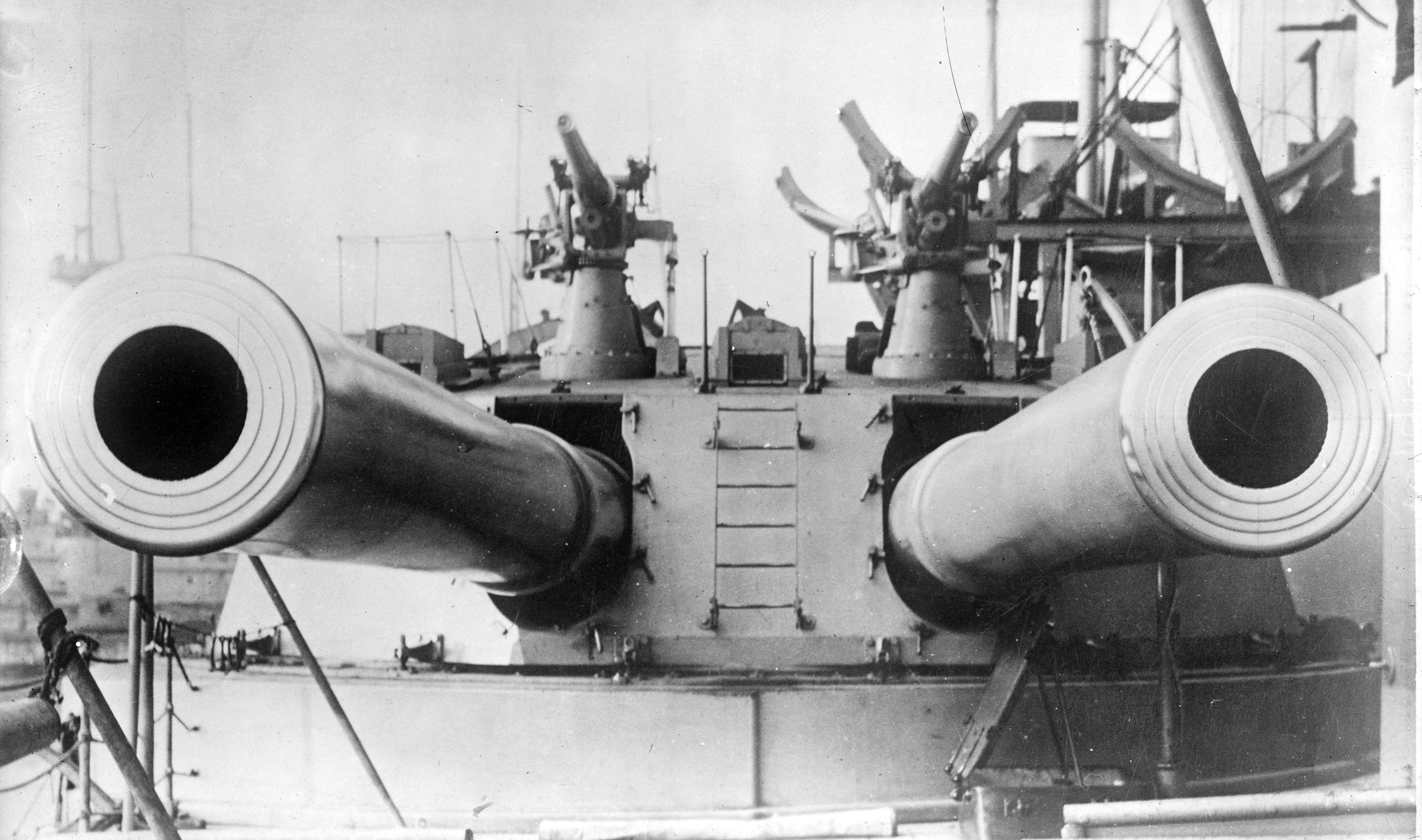
Pair of 12-inch guns on HMS Dreadnought, between 1907-1922

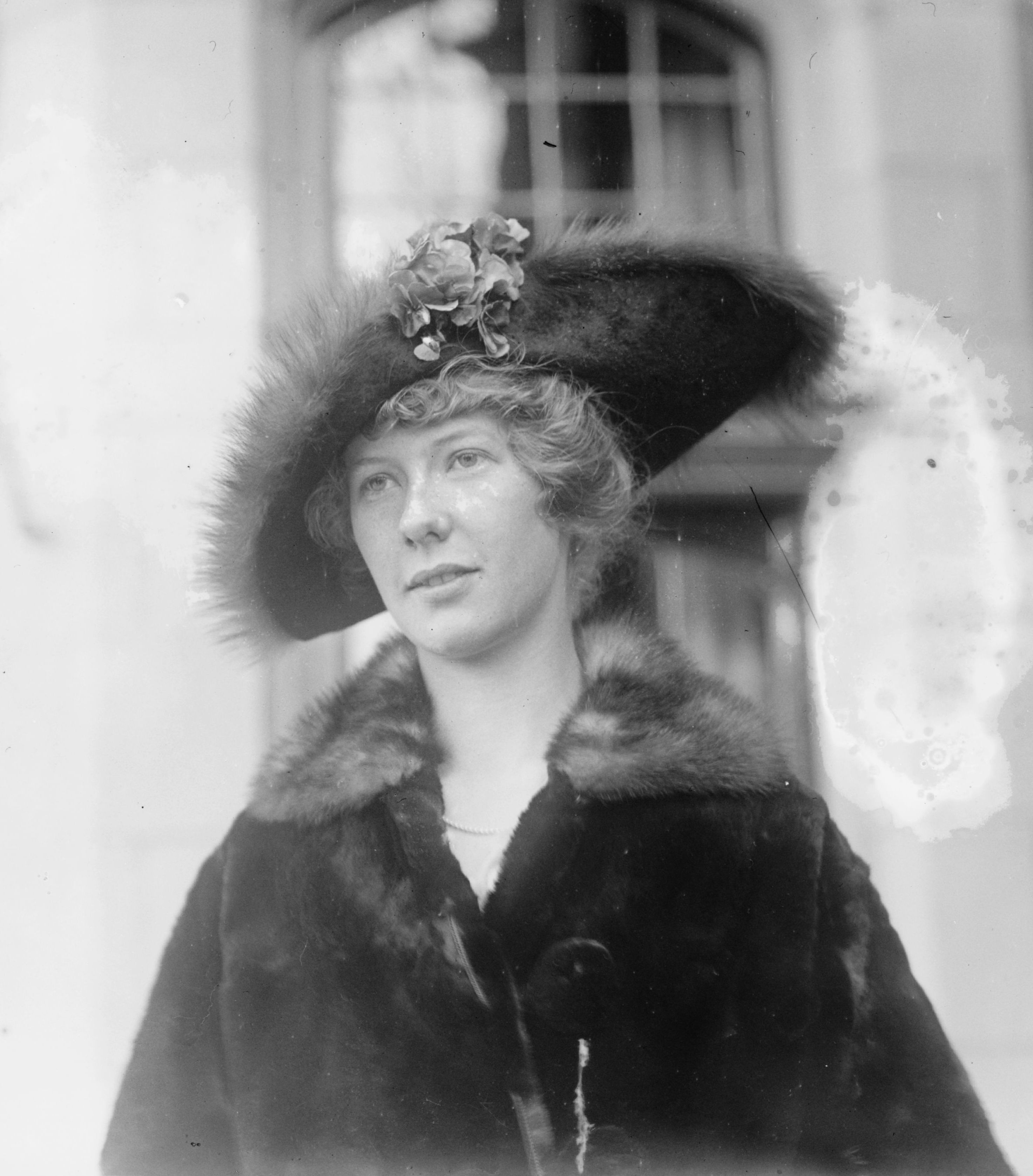
Helen Dinsmore Huntington

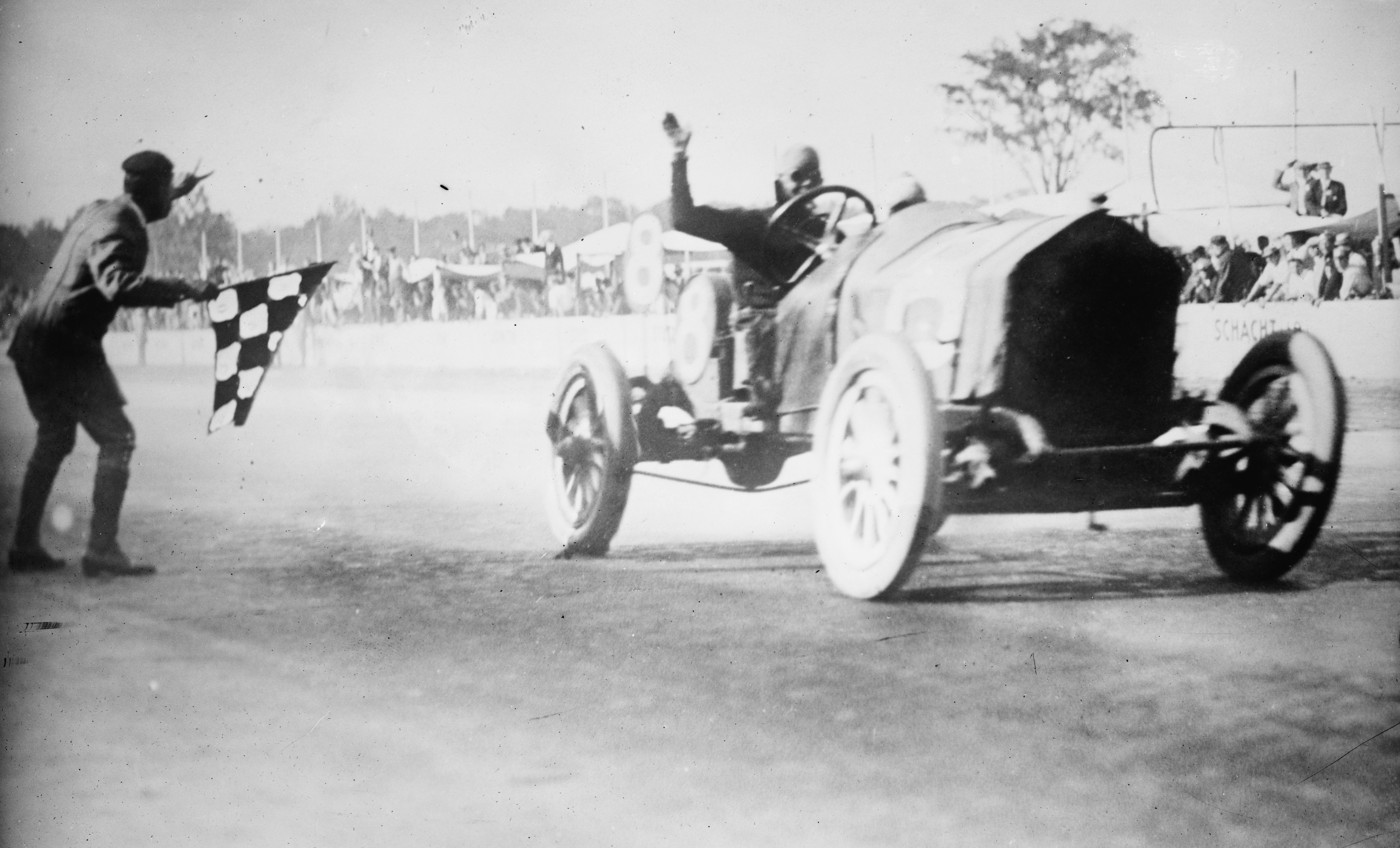
Joe Dawson, winning the 1912 Indianapolis 500

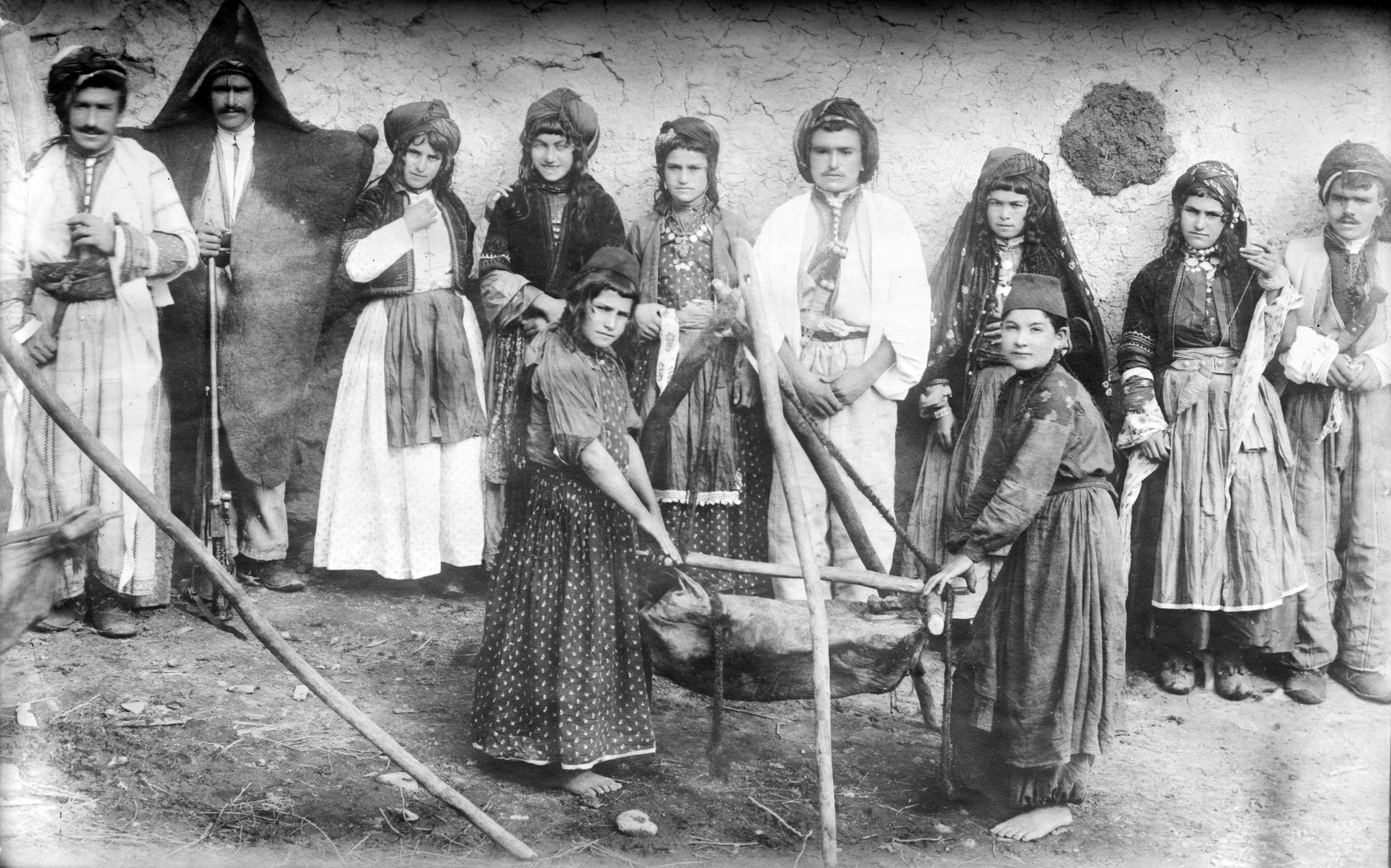
Nestorian (Assyrian) Christian family making butter in Mawana, Persia, date unknown

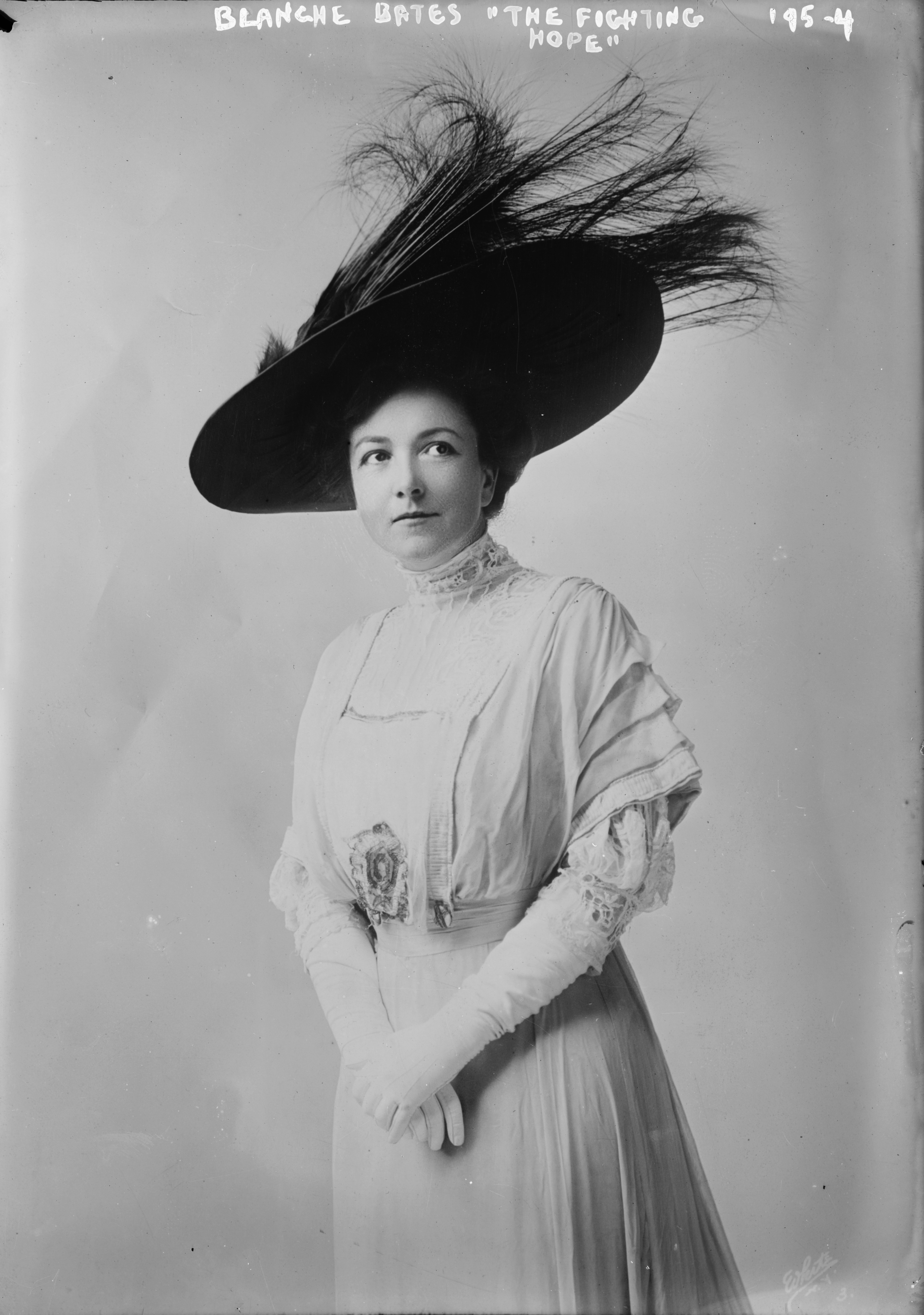
American actress Blanche Bates, dressed for a role in "The Fighting Hope"

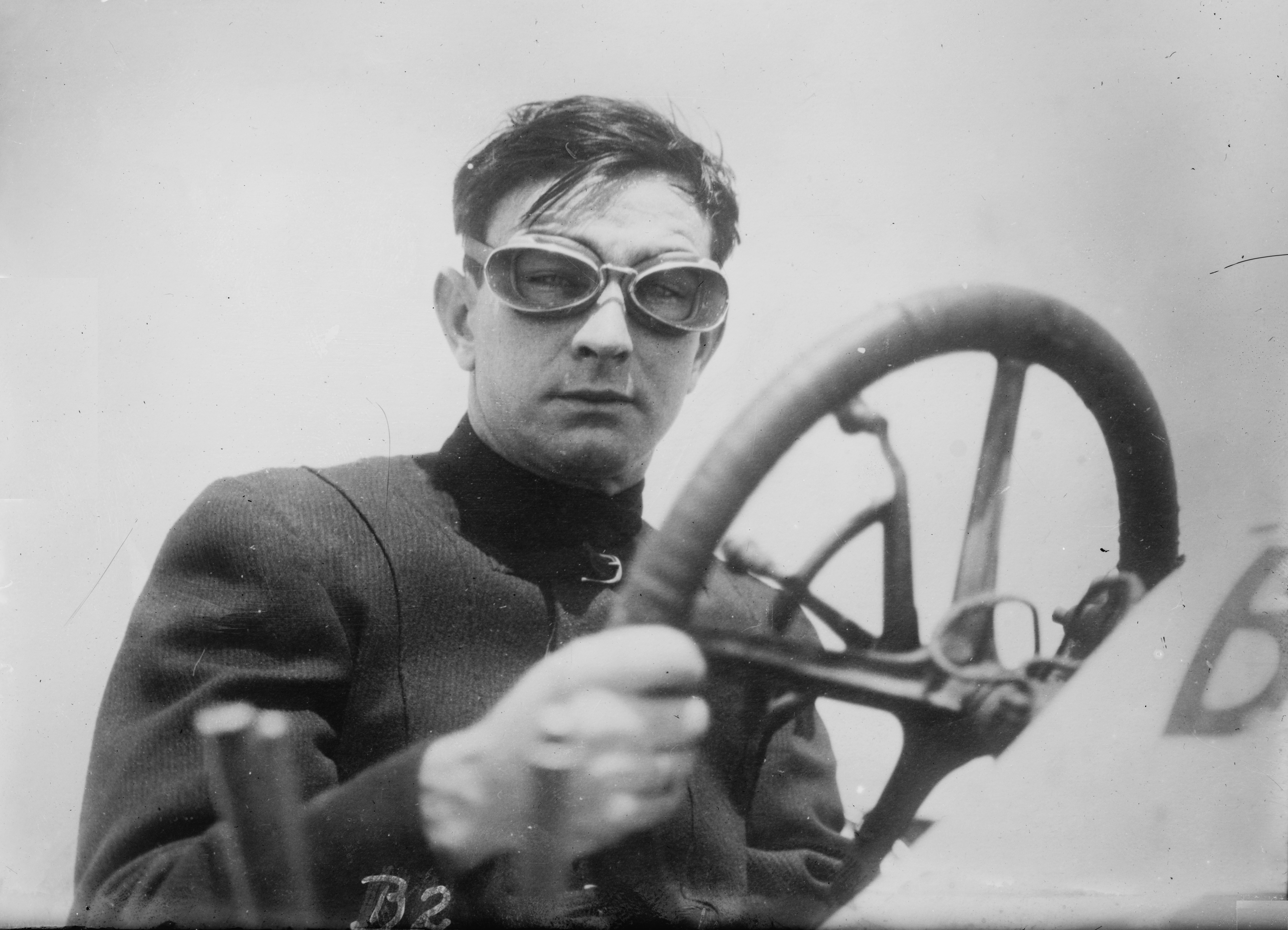
Race car driver Bob Burman, 1911

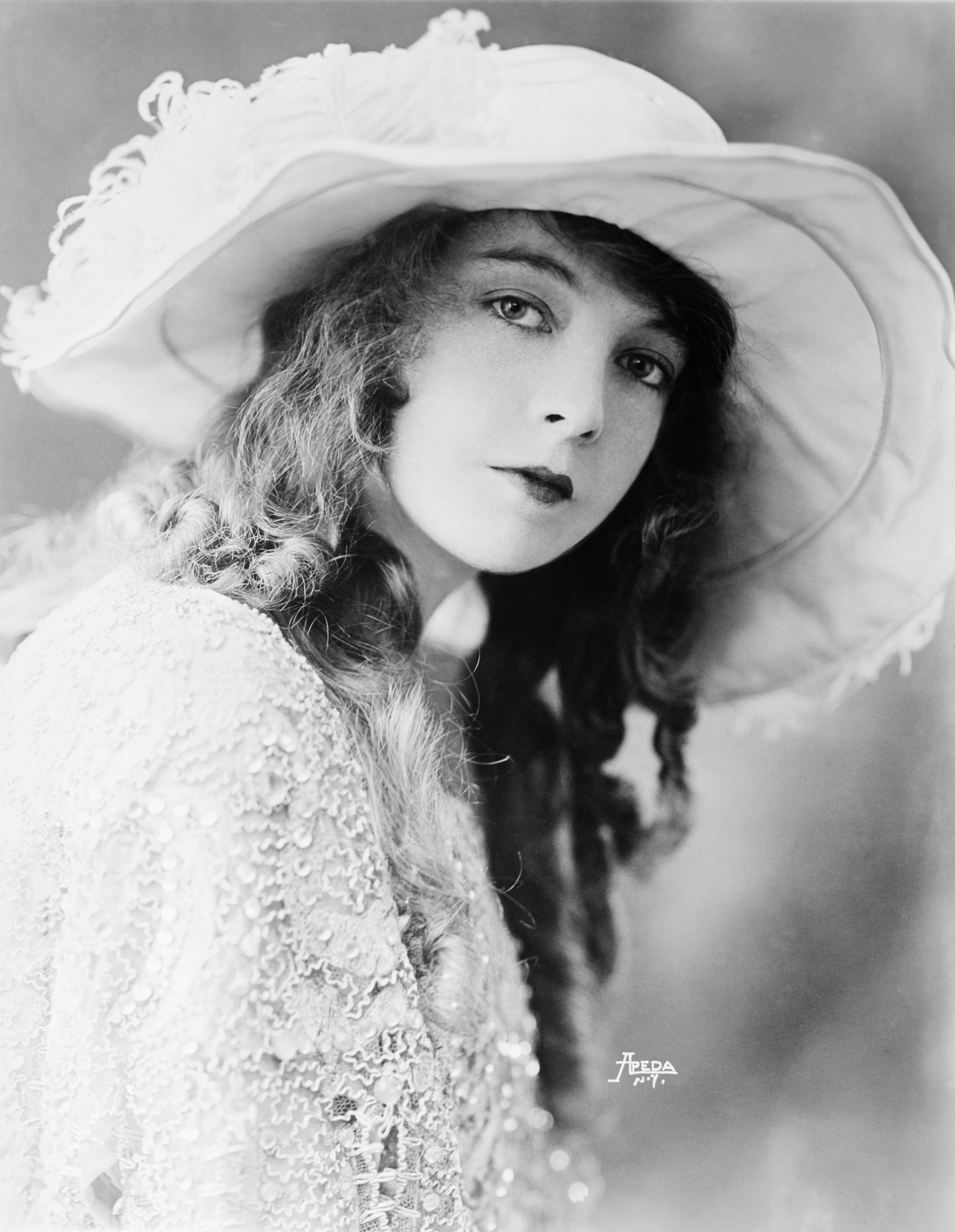
Actress Lillian Gish, 1911

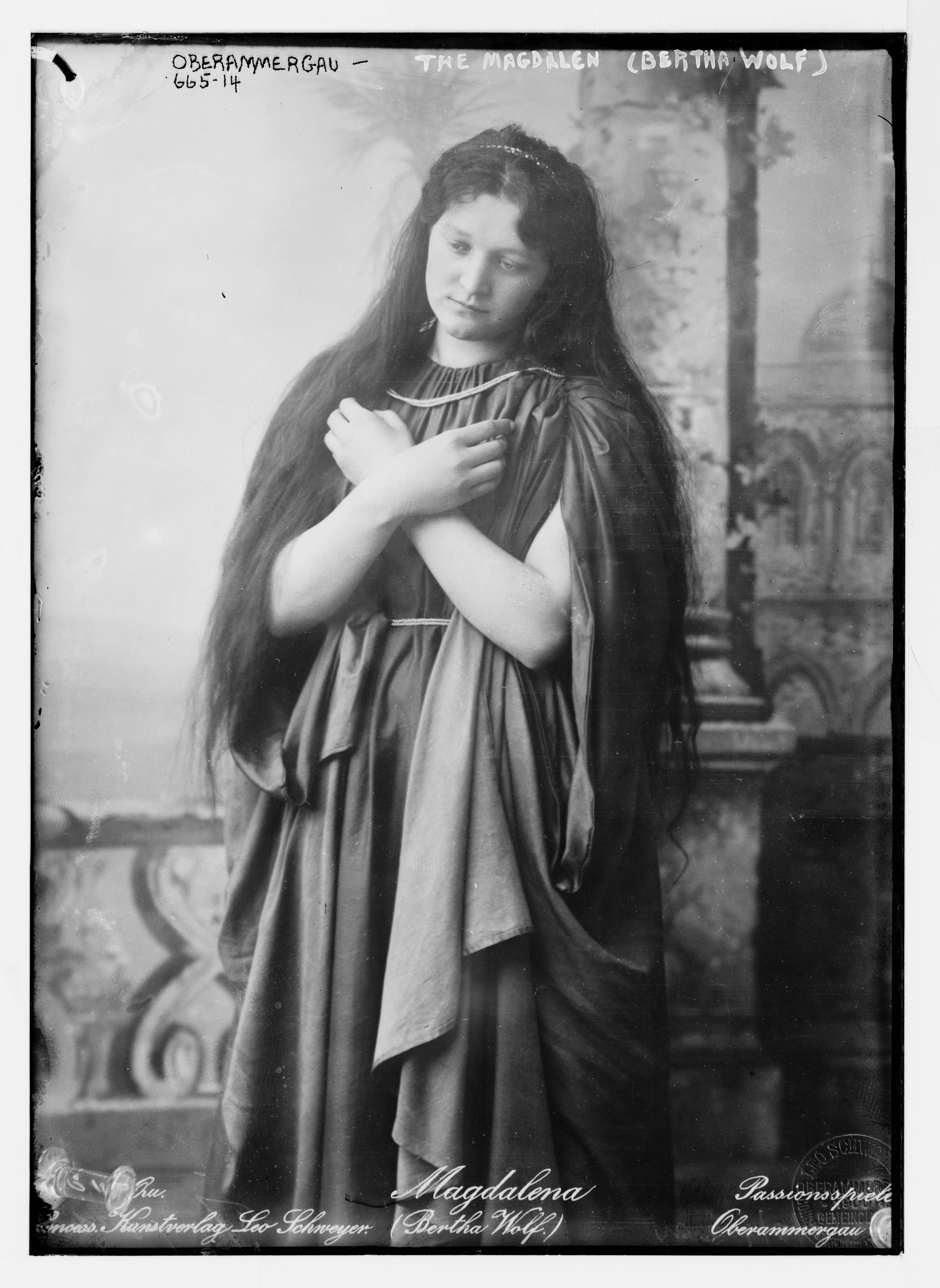
Bertha Wolf as Mary Magdalen, at the Oberammergau Passion Play, 1900

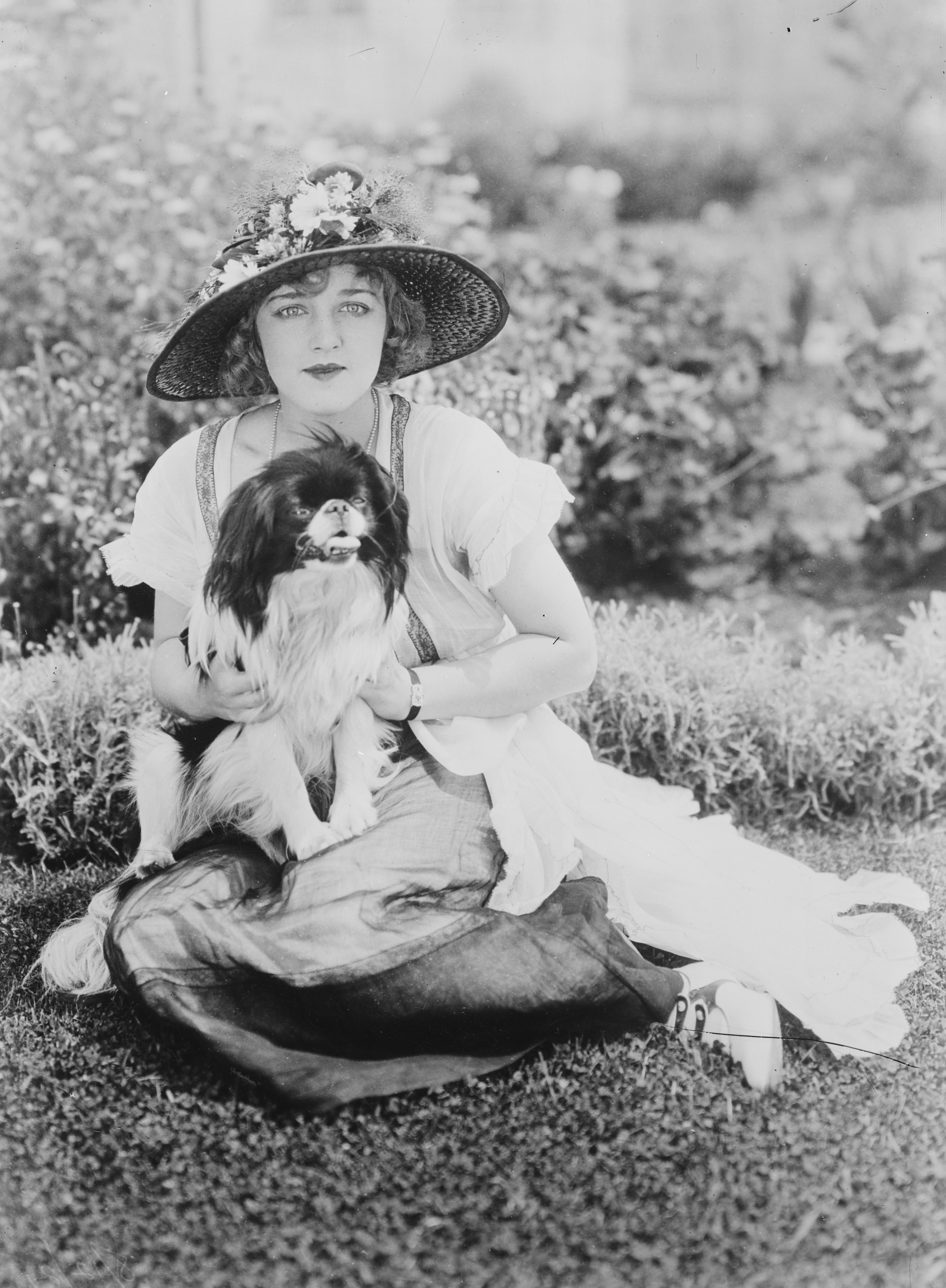
Actress Mildred Davis, 1921

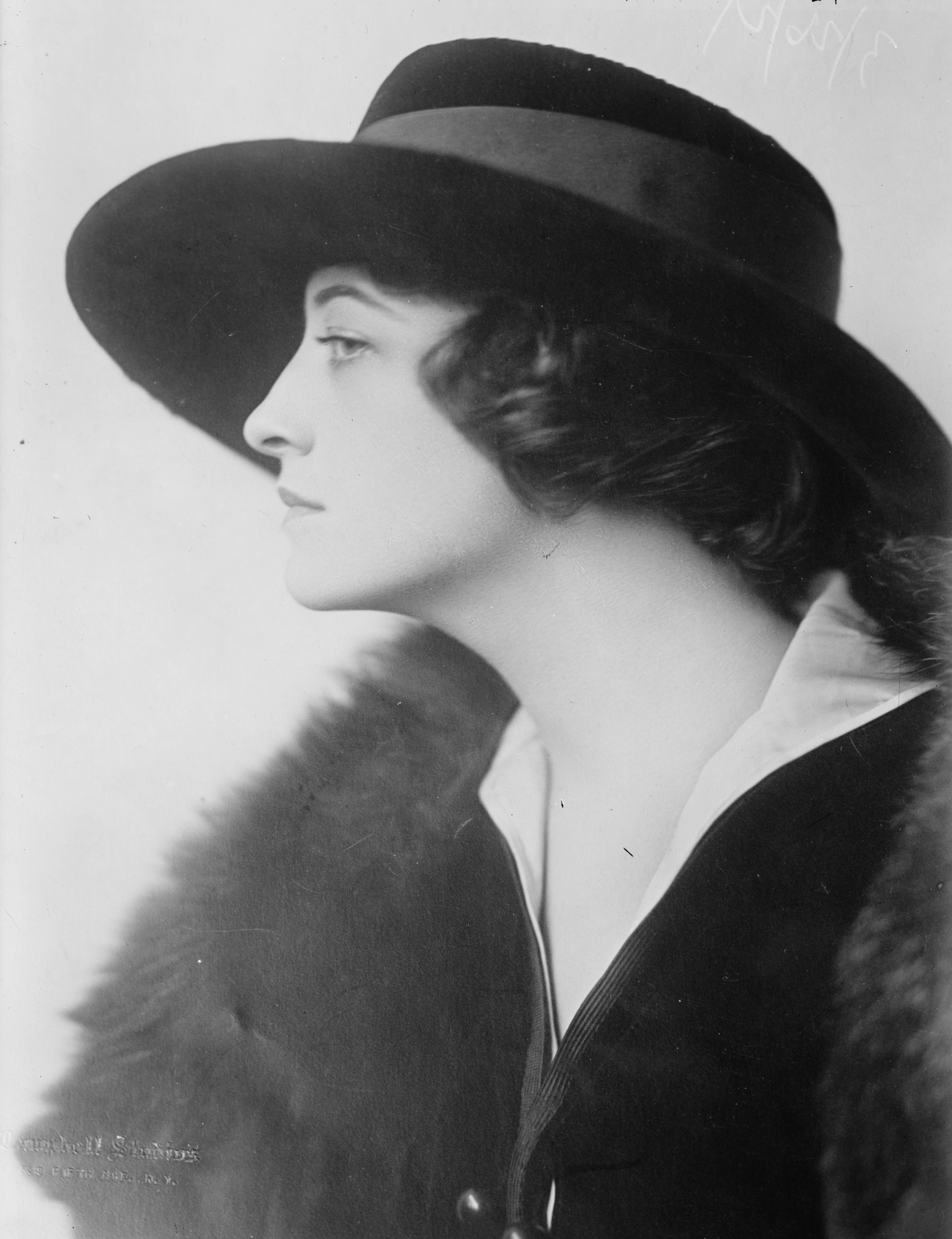
Actress Pauline Frederick

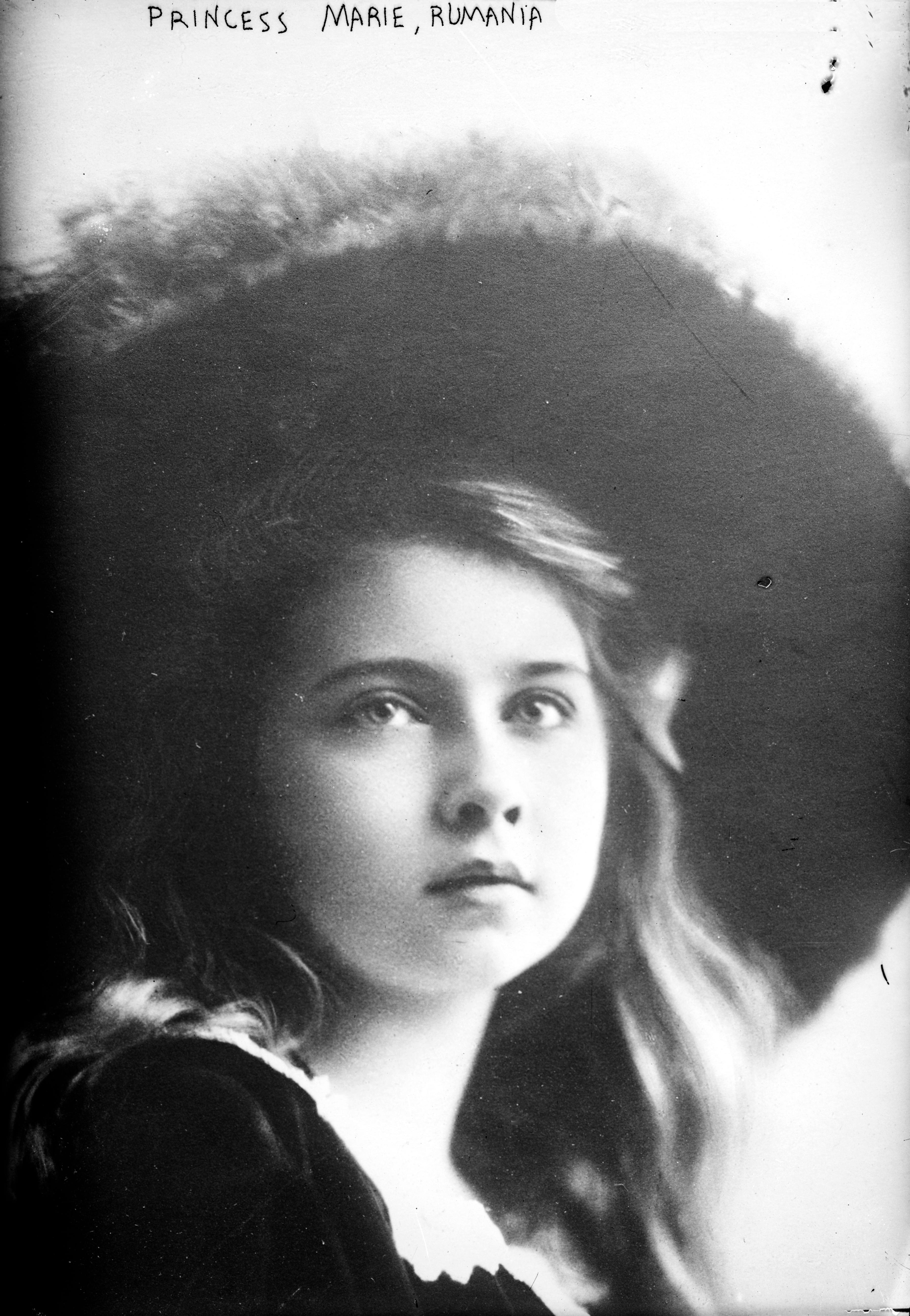
Maria of Yugoslavia as a child, when she was Princess Marie of Romania

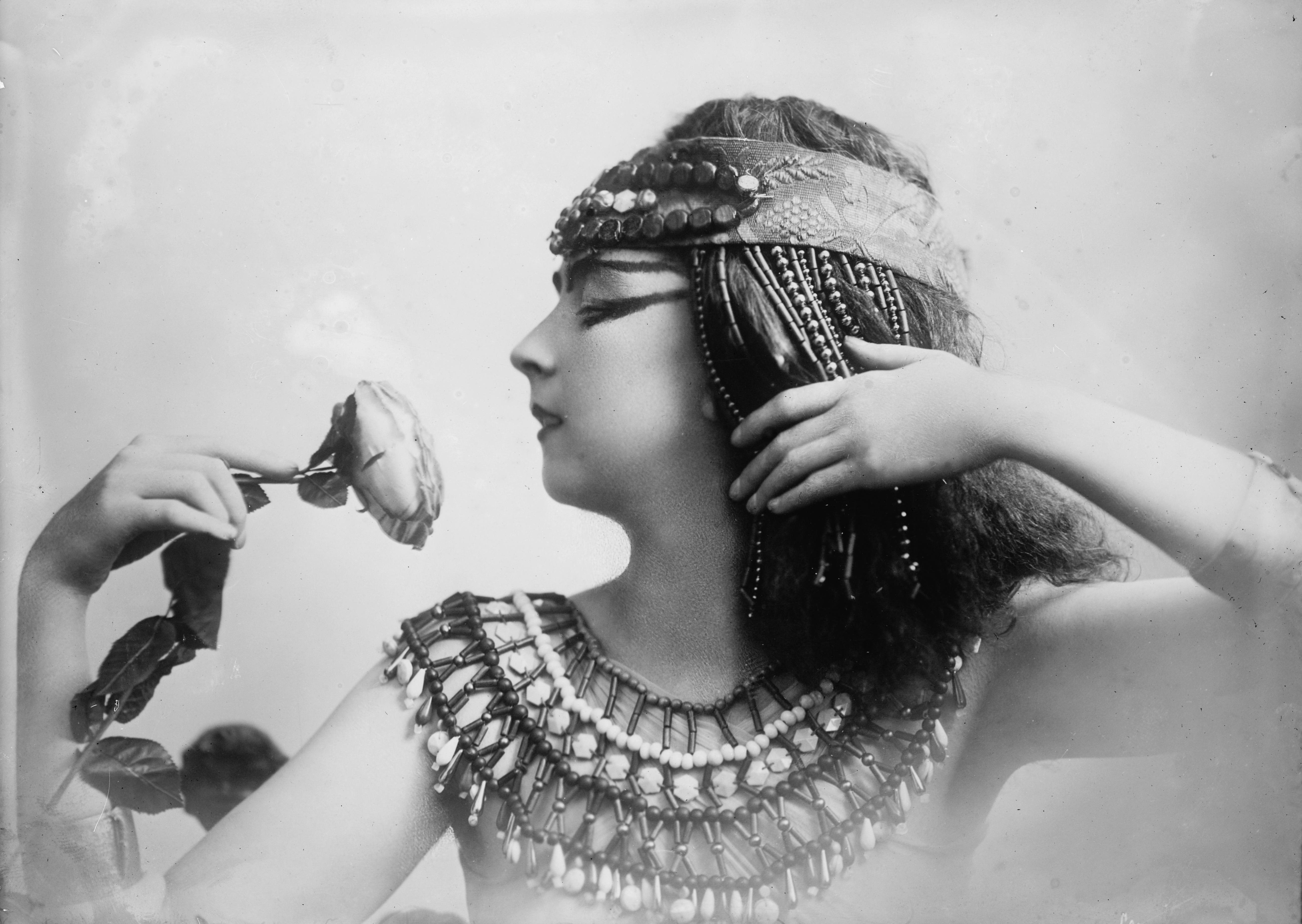
Dancer Ruth St. Denis

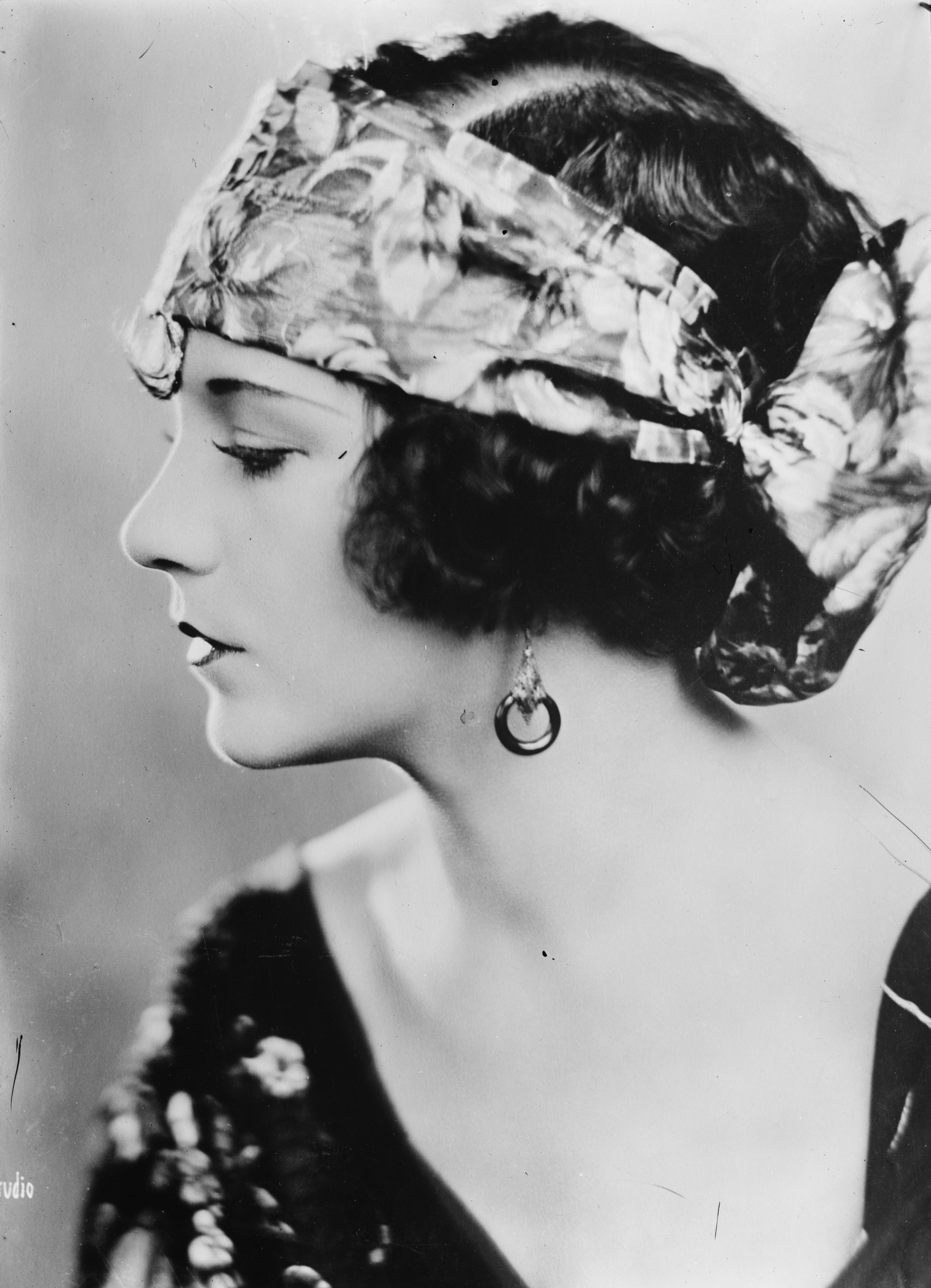
Actress Viola Dana

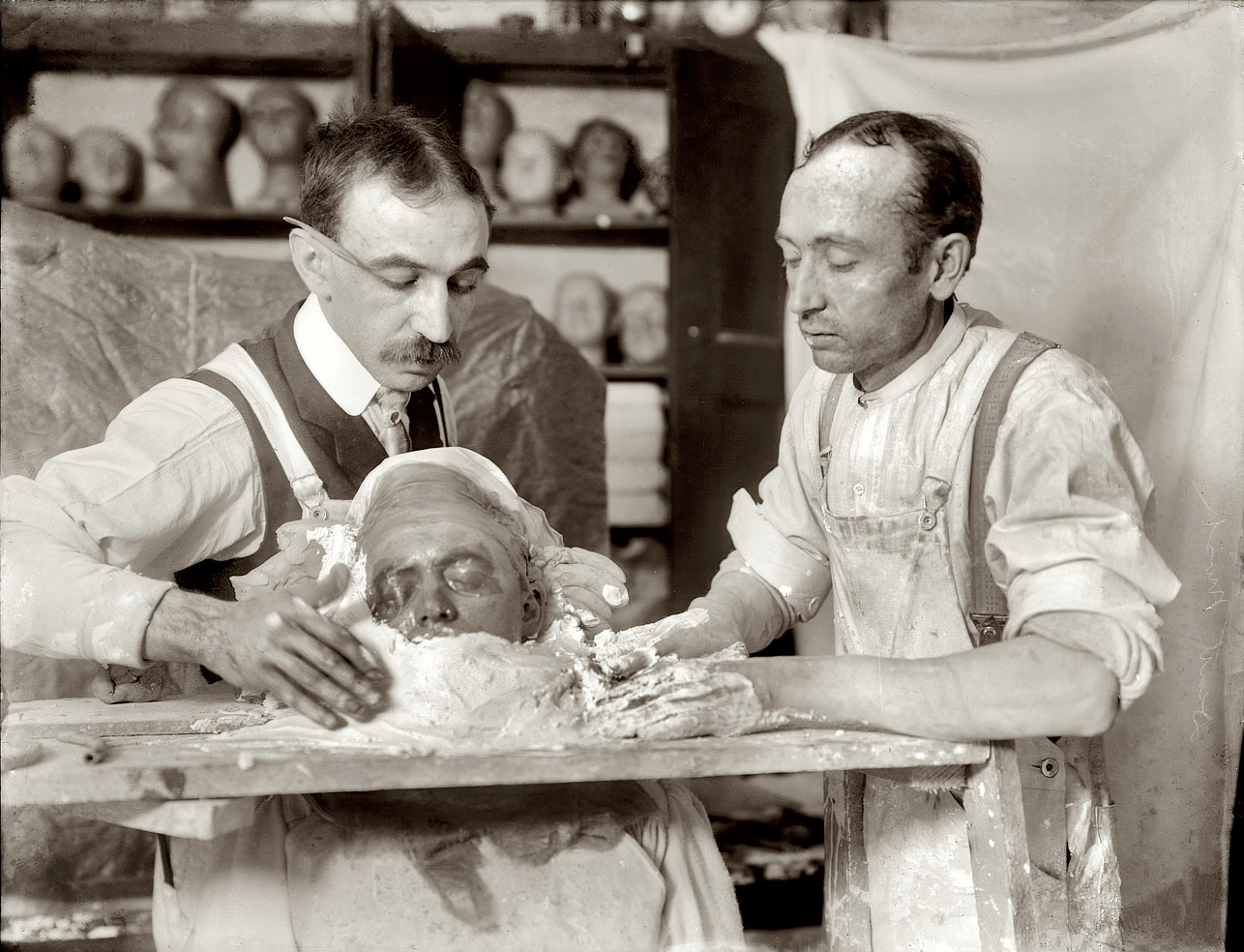
Making of a death mask, 1908

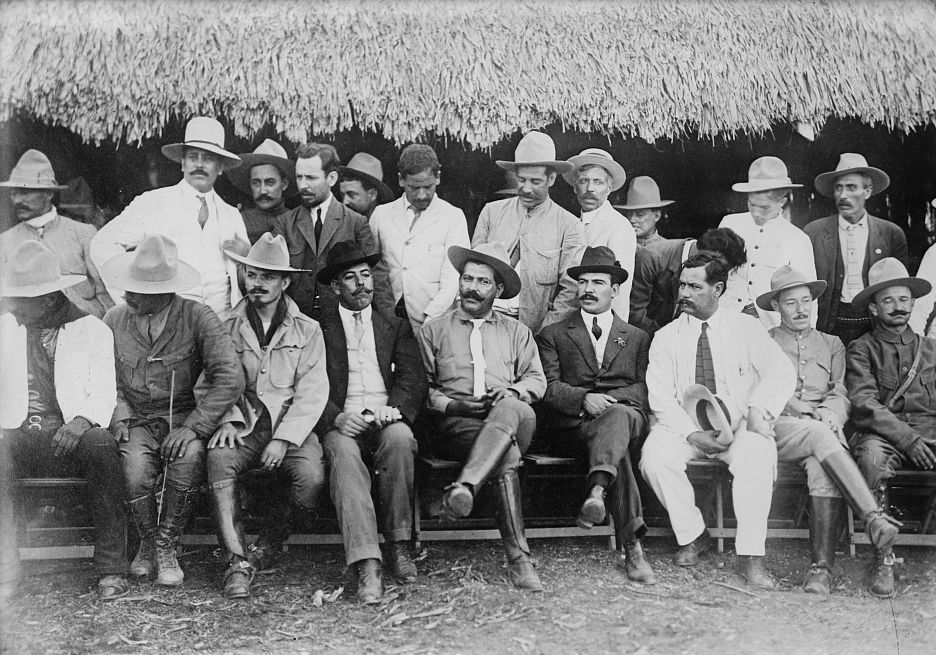
Lucio Blanco and staff, c. 1913

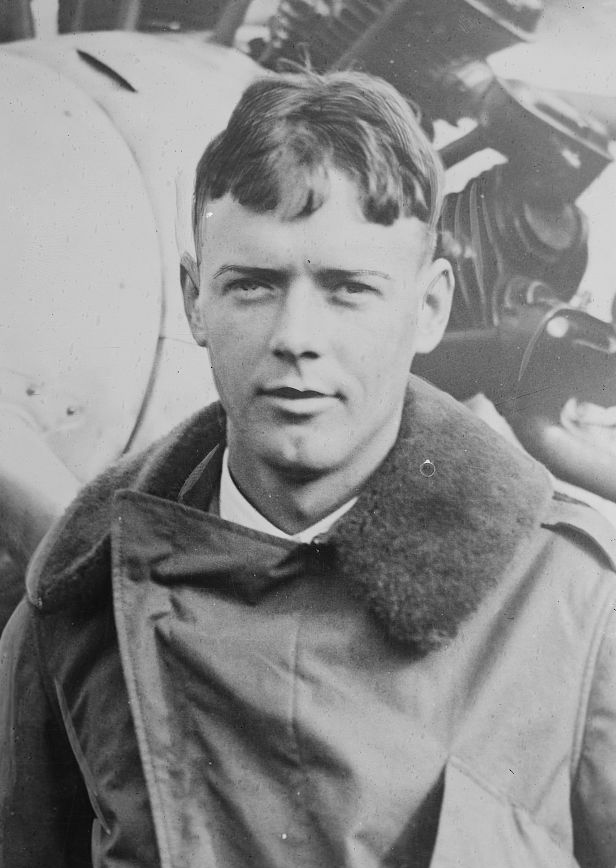
Charles Lindbergh, c. 1927
