= Locusts on Hudson =

Estate in Staatsburg, New York

Coordinates: 41.863790°N 73.927395°W

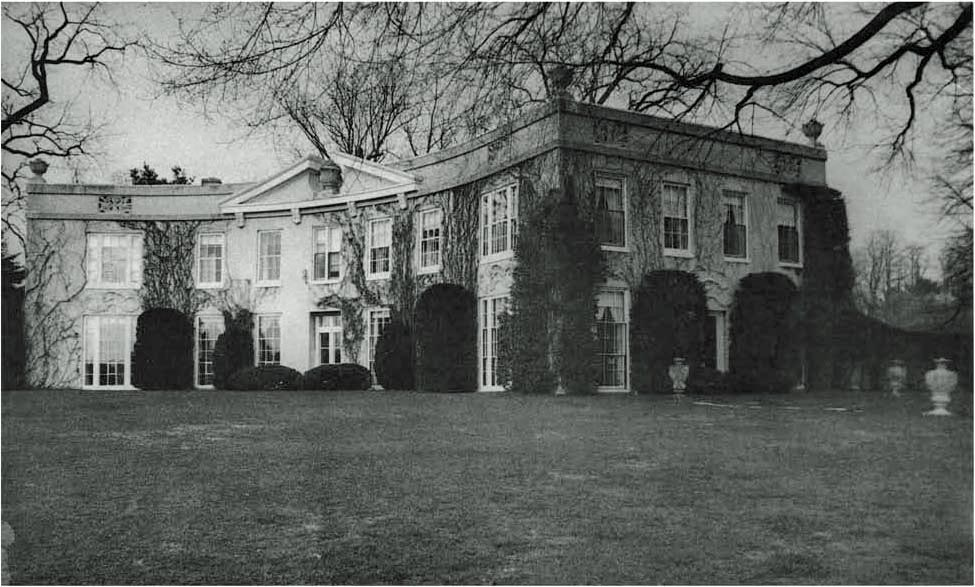
Locust on Hudson, designed by architect John Churchill

Locusts on Hudson is a 76-acre (31 ha) estate in Staatsburg, New York, owned by hotelier André Balazs. The property has both an operating farm and manor. The historic estate now acts as an events venue due in part to its naturalistic landscape. A portion of the produce and animals of the farm are sent to The Standard Grill, The Standard, High Line Hotel, and Narcissa at The Standard, East Village Hotel, also owned by Balazs, in New York City, New York. Designed by architect John Churchill in the early 1940s, the estate's manor is of a neo-baroque style. Beside the manor, there are many grey and white antique remnants of dairy barns on the property.

== History ==
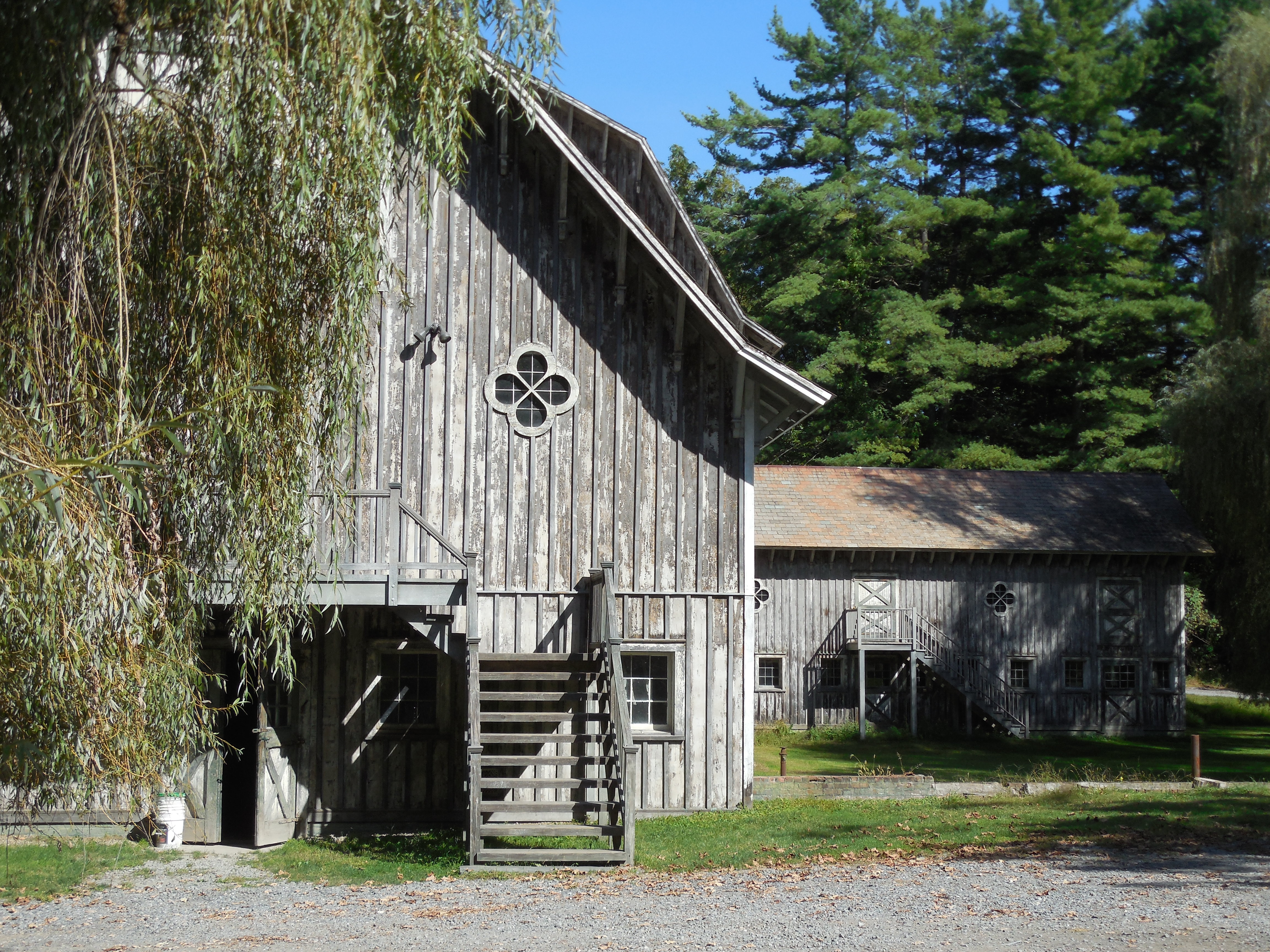
One of the antique farm buildings on the Locusts on Hudson estate

American Revolutionary War officer and Associate Justice Henry Brockholst Livingston bought the "Wittemount" estate from a man by the name of De Witt in 1782. Brockholst Livingston developed the land on the estate more than had been done before. In 1797, he gave the property the new title “The Locusts” (not to be confused with Locust Grove) for its black locust trees. Livingston removed a log cabin from, and added a red brick mansion to, the property. Livingston resided on the estate for some years before selling it to Major George William Augustus Provost.

George William Prevost inherited a large portion of this property and conveyed it in April 1811 to James Duane Livingston, son of Robert Cambridge Livingston. On October 19, 1835, James Livingston sold it to William C. Emmet of New York, who occupied it as a country seat until 1854, when it was purchased by William Brown Dinsmore (1810–1888), president of the Adams Express Company. The mansion was built by Dinsmore in 1873. The grounds surrounding the house formed a lawn of from fifty to sixty acres, beautified by extensive floral display and a profusion of bedding plants. Dinsmore had a particular interest in horticulture and especially floriculture.

Dinsmore added extensive gardens, farmland, and greenhouses to the estate. In the 19th century, the property was the subject of at least one American School painting. Helen Dinsmore Huntington, daughter William B. Dinsmore Jr. (1844–1906), inherited the property which was called "Staatsburg on Hudson". Huntington had the mansion demolished and replaced it with the current home in 1941. As part of the interior decoration, she had Albert Bierstadt's 1869 landscape painting Among the Sierra Nevada Mountains removed from its frame and glued to an interior wall in the new house. After divorcing her husband of 26 years, Vincent Astor, she married Lytle Hull. During that time, many famous musicians, such as Cole Porter, Leonard Bernstein, and Elsa Maxwell, visited the estate for galas held to support her philanthropic projects. Bob Guccione, founder and publisher of Penthouse magazine, owned the property, utilizing it as a weekend country house. At the time, the property was referred to as “The Willows”. In 2004, the estate was foreclosed before being bought by Uma Thurman and André Balazs.
