= Helen Huntington Hull =

American socialite, patron of arts and political hostess (1893–1976)

- Born: Helen Dinsmore Huntington; April 9, 1893; Manhattan, New York, U.S.
- Died: December 14, 1976 (aged 83); Staatsburg, New York, U.S.
- Occupations: Socialite, arts patron, political hostess
- Political party: Republican
- Spouses: William Vincent Astor (m. 1914; div. 1941) Lytle Hull (m. 1941; died 1958)
- Parent(s): Robert Palmer Huntington; Helen Gray Dinsmore

Helen Dinsmore Huntington Astor Hull (April 9, 1893 – December 11, 1976) was an American socialite, arts patron, and political hostess.

== Early life ==
Huntington was born in Manhattan, on April 9, 1893, to Helen Gray Dinsmore and Robert Palmer Huntington, an architect and tennis player.

She grew up in Rhinebeck, New York, at both her paternal mansion, Hopeland House, a 35-room Tudor Revival mansion designed by her father, and her maternal mansion, Staatsburg on Hudson.

Huntington attended schools in Dobbs Ferry, New York.

== Career ==
During World War I, Huntington participated in the war effort by waiting tables for American soldiers in Brest and Bordeaux.

In 1927, Astor built a townhouse for the two of them in a row that is now listed in the United States National Register of Historic Places. Designed by Mott B. Schmidt, the Vincent Astor House at 130 East 80th Street is now part of a block of four houses known as the East 80th Street Houses.

=== Arts patronage ===
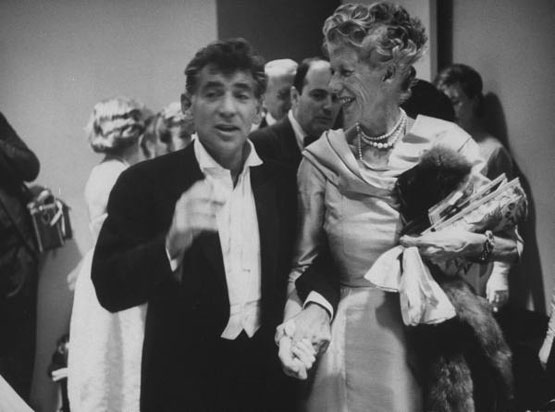
Helen Huntington Hull with Leonard Bernstein in 1962

Huntington was a lover of music and opera (she attended her first opera when she was two) and, therefore, helped to found the New York City Center and the New York City Opera.

She was a patron of the Metropolitan Opera on Broadway. She owned two boxes at the opera house, one she used herself and one she kept for her guests. In 1966, she was among those who attended the closing gala at the Met on Broadway and helped found its re-opening at Lincoln Center. She attended the inauguration gala night at Philharmonic Hall, directed by her friend Leonard Bernstein.

Huntington was on the board of directors of the New York City Ballet, The Metropolitan Opera, the New York Philharmonic, and the Lincoln Center for the Performing Arts. She was a trustee of the Metropolitan Museum of Art. She created the Musicians' Emergency Fund to support musicians, creating teaching and performing jobs.

Also an accomplished piano-player, in 1942 Huntington performed at the Poughkeepsie High School in the presence of Eleanor Roosevelt. This was her only public performance. After that, she continued to play into her 70s, often with her Locust-on-Hudson's neighbor, pianist Rudolf Firkušný.

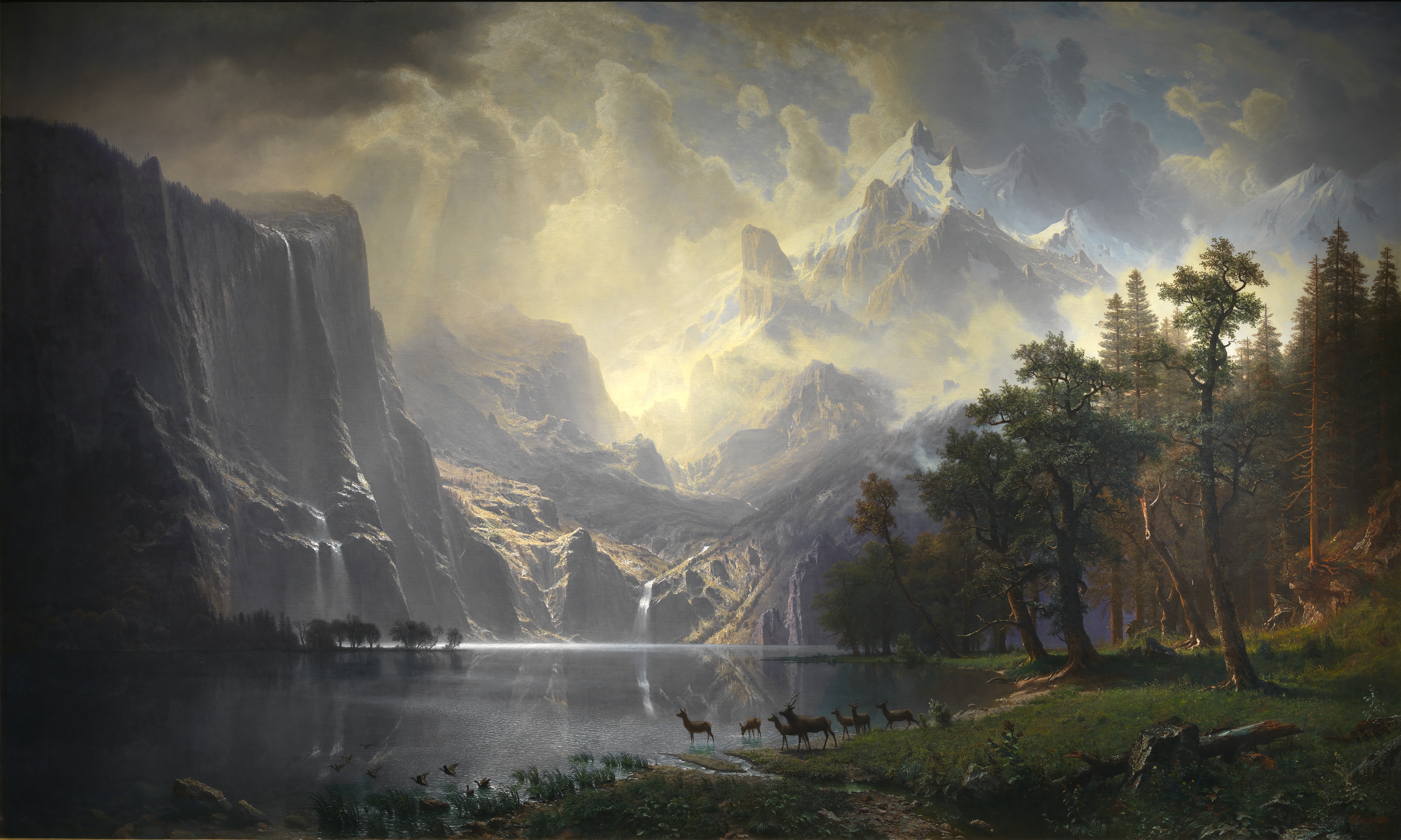
Albert Bierstadt, Among the Sierra Nevada, California (1868)

Among the Sierra Nevada, California is an 1868 oil painting by Albert Bierstadt. It was acquired in 1873 by William Brown Dinsmore, Huntington's grandfather; when Huntington inherited the painting, she had the canvas glued directly to a curved wall on the second floor of her new mansion, Locusts on Hudson. When she died in 1976, she bequeathed the painting to the Smithsonian American Art Museum.

Huntington was a good friend of Elsa Maxwell, Cole Porter, and Maury Henry Biddle Paul (aka Cholly Knickerbocker).

=== Political hostess ===
When, in 1913, Astor was asked if his future wife, Helen Huntington, believed in suffrage for women, he replied that she was far too sensible for that.

In 1924, Huntington was an alternate delegate for New York to the Republican National Convention and in 1926 and 1927 she co-chaired the Women's Republican National Committee for New York. She was a guest at the United States presidential inaugural balls of four different U.S. presidents: Calvin Coolidge, Herbert Hoover, Dwight D. Eisenhower, and Richard Nixon. She was a good friend of Nelson Rockefeller and his wife, Happy Rockefeller.

In 1941, Helen inherited Staatsburg on Hudson from her maternal grandfather, William Brown Dinsmore II, head of Adams Express Company, a railroad and shipping concern. She demolished the previous mansion to build a much lighter house, known as Locusts on Hudson, that was designed by architect John Churchill in the Neobaroque style. Her family had deep roots in politics. (Note: Huntington's relatives including: Elisha Mills Huntington; Nathaniel Huntington, an Indiana State Representative; James Huntington, member of New York State Senate; Samuel Huntington, delegate to the Continental Congress and Governor of Connecticut; Samuel Huntington, delegate to the Ohio Constitutional Convention (1802), Governor of Ohio; Benjamin Huntington, delegate to the Second Continental Congress and member of the U.S. House of Representatives during the First United States Congress; Henry Huntington, member of New York State; and Gurdon Huntington, member of New York State Assembly.) At Locusts on Hudson, she held her gala fundraising events and raised her six dogs, and at Hopeland House, she hosted her Republican political fundraising events, attended by the likes of former U.S. presidents Herbert Hoover and Calvin Coolidge.

== Personal life ==
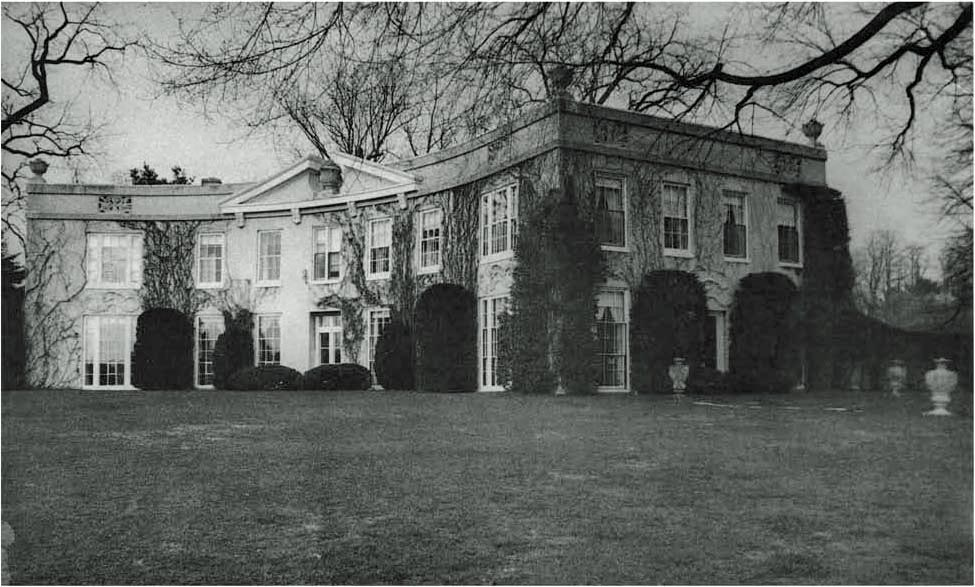
Locusts on Hudson, designed by architect John Churchill

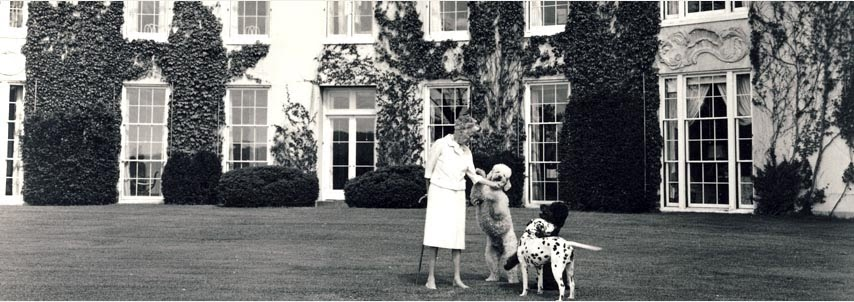
Helen Huntington Hull and her dogs in front of Locusts on Hudson

On April 30, 1914, Huntington, age 21, married William Vincent Astor (1891–1959), son of Lt.-Col. John Jacob Astor IV and Ava Lowle Willing. (Note: Her family was among the founders of Huntington, Indiana, and for this reason, the town paid tribute to the memory of its founder by sending a handsome cedar chest to Helen Dinsmore Huntington on the occasion of her wedding to Vincent Astor.) The couple had known each other since they were children; the Astor family mansion, Ferncliff, was located just a few miles from Hopeland House. The press described her as "a charming American girl". Helen asked Astor to choose as their main residence the Hudson Valley mansion, Ferncliff, because she did not care for society life. The wedding took place at Hopeland House and the nearby little country church. After the marriage, they went on a cruise on the Noma, Vincent Astor's yacht that was later loaned to the U.S. Army during World War I.

The couple eventually divorced at the beginning of 1941 after which she moved south to 60th Street, New York City.

Huntington remarried to Lytle Hull (1882–1958), a real estate broker and an old friend of Vincent Astor, on April 15, 1941.

She died on December 14, 1976, after a fall at her Locusts on Hudson mansion. The day of her death, the president of the New York Philharmonic, Carlos Moseley, opening the night at the Avery Fisher Hall, said that Helen Huntington Hull was "one of the great music lovers and benefactors of our time".

=== Sexuality ===
Huntington was bisexual. Even while married to Astor in 1914, they mostly led separate lives until their divorce, with Huntington preferring the company of her female friends. Glenway Wescott once called her "a grand old lesbian".

== Ancestry ==
Nathaniel Huntington
Elisha Mills Huntington
Mary Corning
Robert Palmer Huntington
Christopher Rudd
Susan Mary Rudd
Ann Benoist Palmer
Bob Huntington
James Coleman Ford
Alice Ford
Mary Jane Trimble
Helen Dinsmore Huntington
William B. Dinsmoor
William Brown Dinsmoor II
Katherine H. Brown
William Brown Dinsmoor III
Isaac Snow
Augusta Manners Snow
Nancy Gray
Helen Gray Dinsmore
Jonas Adams
Alvin Adams
Phebe Hoar
Helen Frances Adams
John Bridge
Anna Rebecca Bridge
Rebecca Beal
