= Valley of the Yosemite =

1864 oil painting by Albert Bierstadt

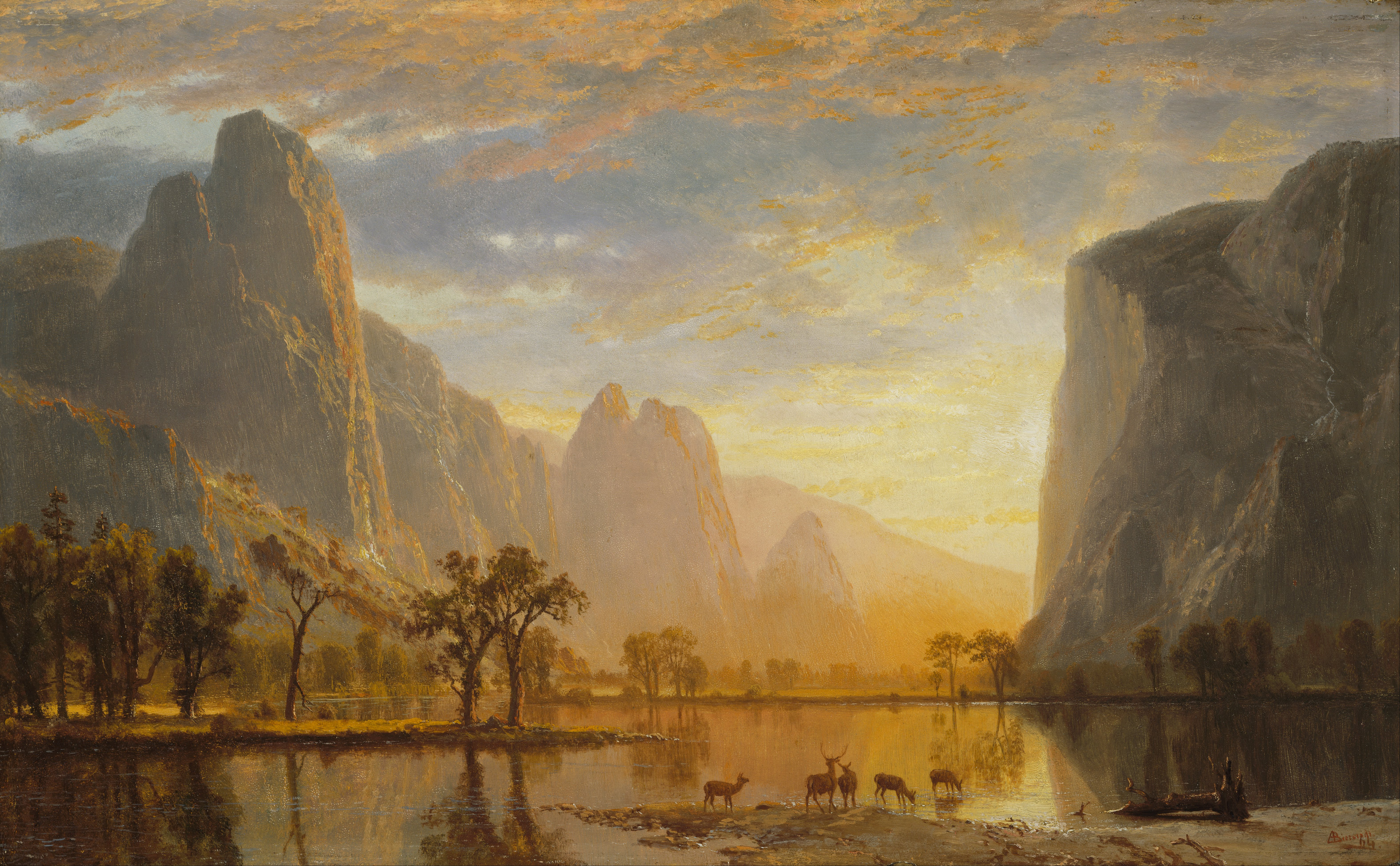
- Artist: Albert Bierstadt
- Year: 1864
- Medium: Oil on paperboard
- Dimensions: 30.16 cm × 48.89 cm (11.87 in × 19.25 in)
- Location: Museum of Fine Arts, Boston; Massachusetts

Valley of the Yosemite (or Valley of the Yo-Semite) is a painting by the German American painter Albert Bierstadt that was completed in 1864. Initially associated with the Hudson River School, Bierstadt rose to prominence for his paintings of the Rocky Mountains, which established him as one of the best painters of the western American landscape. His later paintings of Yosemite were also received with critical acclaim and public praise.

== Painting ==
For his second trip West, in the summer of 1863, Bierstadt went with writer Fitz Hugh Ludlow to the West Coast of the United States. During the trip, Bierstadt spent several weeks doing en plein air studies in Yosemite Valley. Those studies were used as references for his future paintings, including this 1864 Valley of the Yosemite, which was painted in his New York studio. Since this painting was on a smaller scale than his other larger panoramic scenes and it was done on paperboard, it is often thought that it is a sketch for his significantly larger, Looking Down Yosemite Valley, California, which was painted a year later in 1865. Many versions of Valley of the Yosemite were painted by Bierstadt.

Upon viewing Yosemite, Albert Bierstadt immediately wrote to his friend, John Hay, in August 1863, saying he discovered the Garden of Eden in America: Yosemite. With such thoughts of Paradise on his mind, Bierstadt painted an idealistic scene of the American wilderness, which he portrayed as completely untouched by man. Overall, the panoramic scene is idyllic, as a cluster of deer linger peacefully in the center foreground. A painter of the Hudson River School, Bierstadt's style also had aspects of luminism. As seen in this depiction of Yosemite, the setting sun casts a yellow-orange glow over the entire landscape.

Perhaps Bierstadt hoped to preserve this paradise through paintings like these, as a few years later, the First transcontinental railroad was built, which introduced tourism to the American west.

Bierstadt's paintings, specifically ones with the Yosemite Valley as subject matter, resonated with many Americans as an untouched paradise during a time of unrest, as the American Civil War occurred. Furthermore, upon seeing these Yosemite-themed paintings, it spurred Americans to protect America's natural landscape. With public support, in 1864, President Abraham Lincoln signed a bill protecting Yosemite's natural beauty, preserving it as a park for the public to enjoy.

== Provenance ==
Shortly after its completion, in April 1864, the painting was exhibited at the "Metropolitan Fair, in aid of the United States Sanitary Commission." It sold for $1600, which was the highest price paid for any painting in the sale at that Sanitary Fair. James Lenox bought it for his personal art collection. When construction for his Lenox Library (New York) ended, Lenox had the painting displayed in the art galleries. Years after Lenox's death, the Lenox Foundation decided to merge the Lenox Library's collection with the Tilden Trust and Astor Library to create the New York Public Library.

In 1895, the painting belonged to the New York Public Library. However, in April 1943, the New York Public Library auctioned off the painting through Coleman Auction Galleries, and it was bought by Newhouse Galleries. Soon after, A. F. Mondschein (also known as Frederick Mont or Adolf Fritz Mondschein or Frederick Mondschein) of New York acquired the painting. Mondschein was an art dealer and collector. He primarily dealt with Old Masters paintings, which makes his involvement with Bierstadt's Valley of the Yosemite painting unusual.

Mondschein then sold it later that year to Maxim Karolik. Karolik's wife, another prominent collector of American art, gifted the painting to the Museum of Fine Arts, Boston on June 12, 1947.

== See also ==
- List of works by Albert Bierstadt
