= Sunrise on the Matterhorn (Albert Bierstadt) =

Painting by Albert Bierstadt

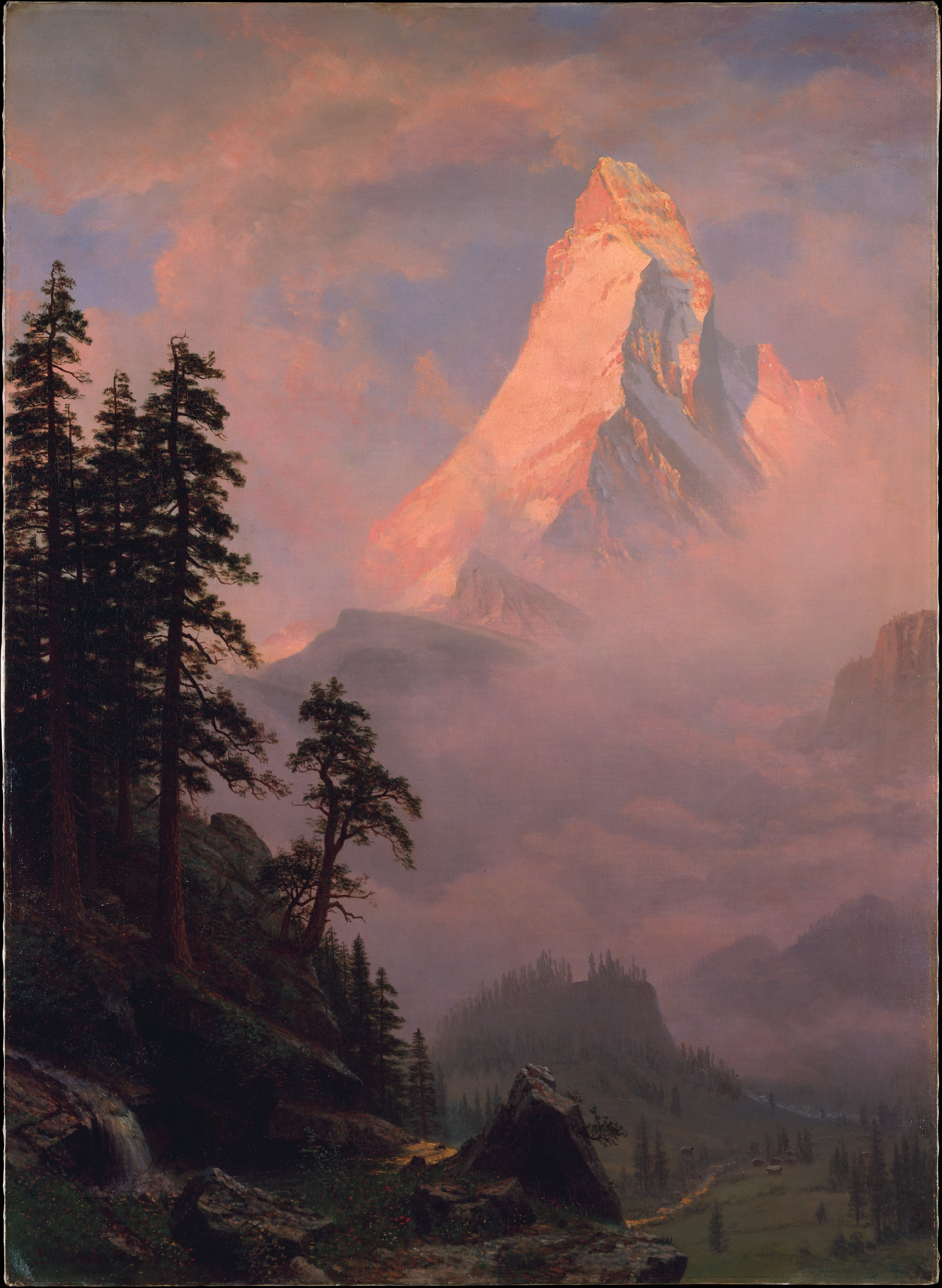
- Artist: Albert Bierstadt
- Year: c. late 19th century
- Subject: The Matterhorn
- Dimensions: 148.6 cm × 108.3 cm (58.5 in × 42.6 in)
- Location: Metropolitan Museum of Art; New York City

Sunrise on the Matterhorn is painting by American artist Albert Bierstadt. Done in oil on canvas and depicting the famous Matterhorn, the painting was produced during one of Bierstadt's numerous trips to Switzerland between the years 1867 and 1897. The painting is currently in the collection of the Metropolitan Museum of Art.

== See also ==
- List of works by Albert Bierstadt
