= Albert Bierstadt =

German-American landscape painter (1830–1902)

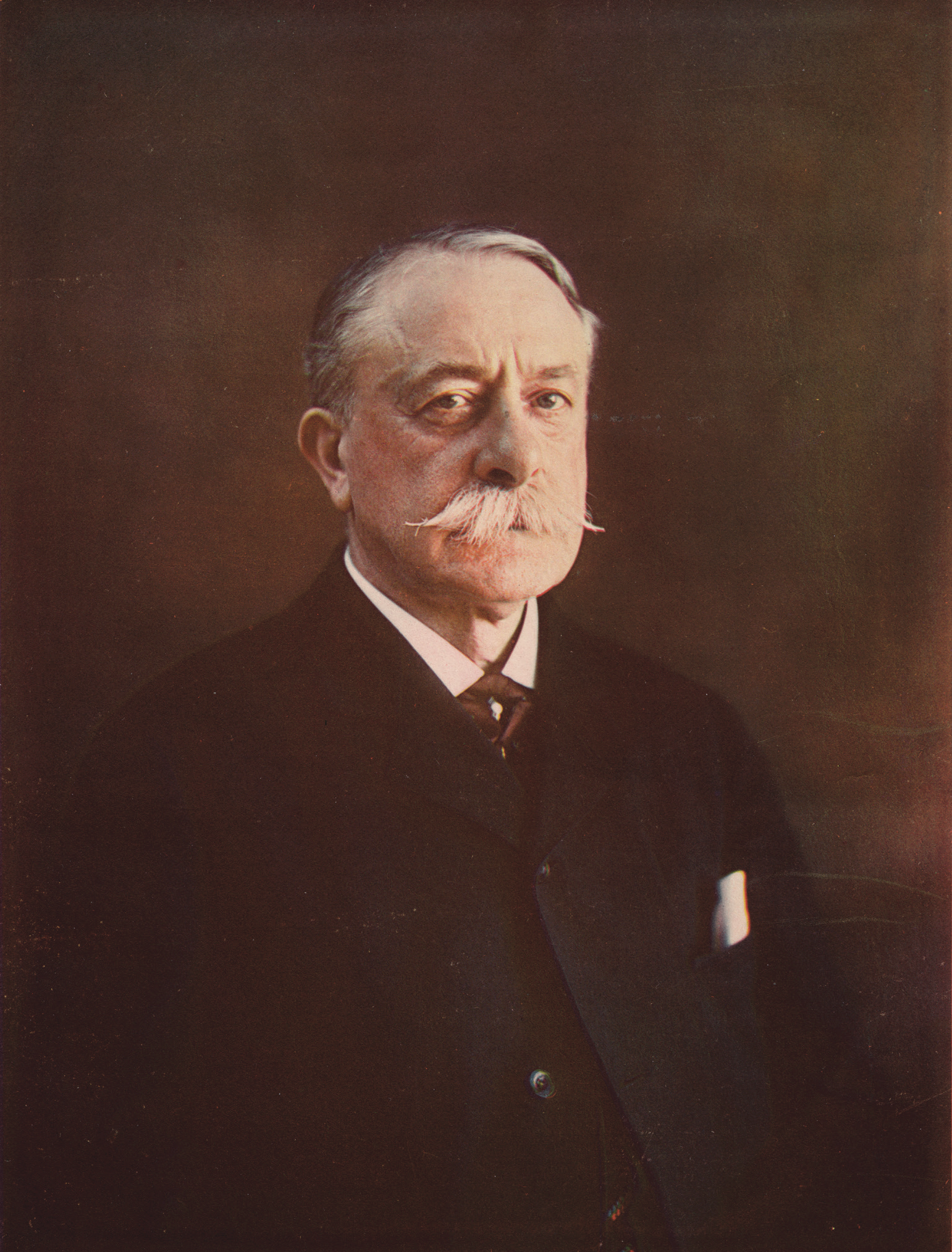
- Bierstadt in an early color photograph by his brother Edward, c. 1895
- Born: January 7, 1830; Solingen, Rhine Province, Prussia
- Died: February 18, 1902 (aged 72); New York City, U.S.
- Education: Düsseldorf School
- Known for: Painting
- Notable work: List of works
- Movement: Hudson River School

Albert Bierstadt (January 7, 1830 – February 18, 1902) was a German-American artist best known for his monumental landscapes that glorified the American West.

Bierstadt was born in Solingen, Germany and emigrated with his family to New Bedford, Massachusetts at age two. In 1853, Bierstadt traveled to Germany to study painting for several years in Düsseldorf. On his return, Bierstadt became part of the second generation of landscape artists associated with the Hudson River School in New York. Bierstadt's travels to Colorado and Wyoming territories in 1859 shifted his artistic focus to the American West. He joined geographical and geological surveys to document scenery. The grand, theatrical vistas he painted of the Rocky Mountains, Sierra Nevada, and Yosemite Valley brought acclaim and made Bierstadt a financial success, yet also drew criticism when tastes and perspectives shifted.

== Early life and education ==
Bierstadt was born in Solingen, Rhine Province, Prussia, on January 7, 1830. He was the son of Christina M. (Tillmans) and Henry Bierstadt, a cooper. His older brothers were prominent stereo view photographers Edward Bierstadt and Charles Bierstadt. Albert was just a year old when his family emigrated to New Bedford, Massachusetts, in 1831. He made clever crayon sketches in his youth and developed a taste for art.

In 1851, Bierstadt began to paint in oils. He returned to Germany in 1853 and studied painting for several years in Düsseldorf with members of its informal school of painting. After returning to New Bedford in 1857, he taught drawing and painting briefly before devoting himself full-time to painting.

== Career ==
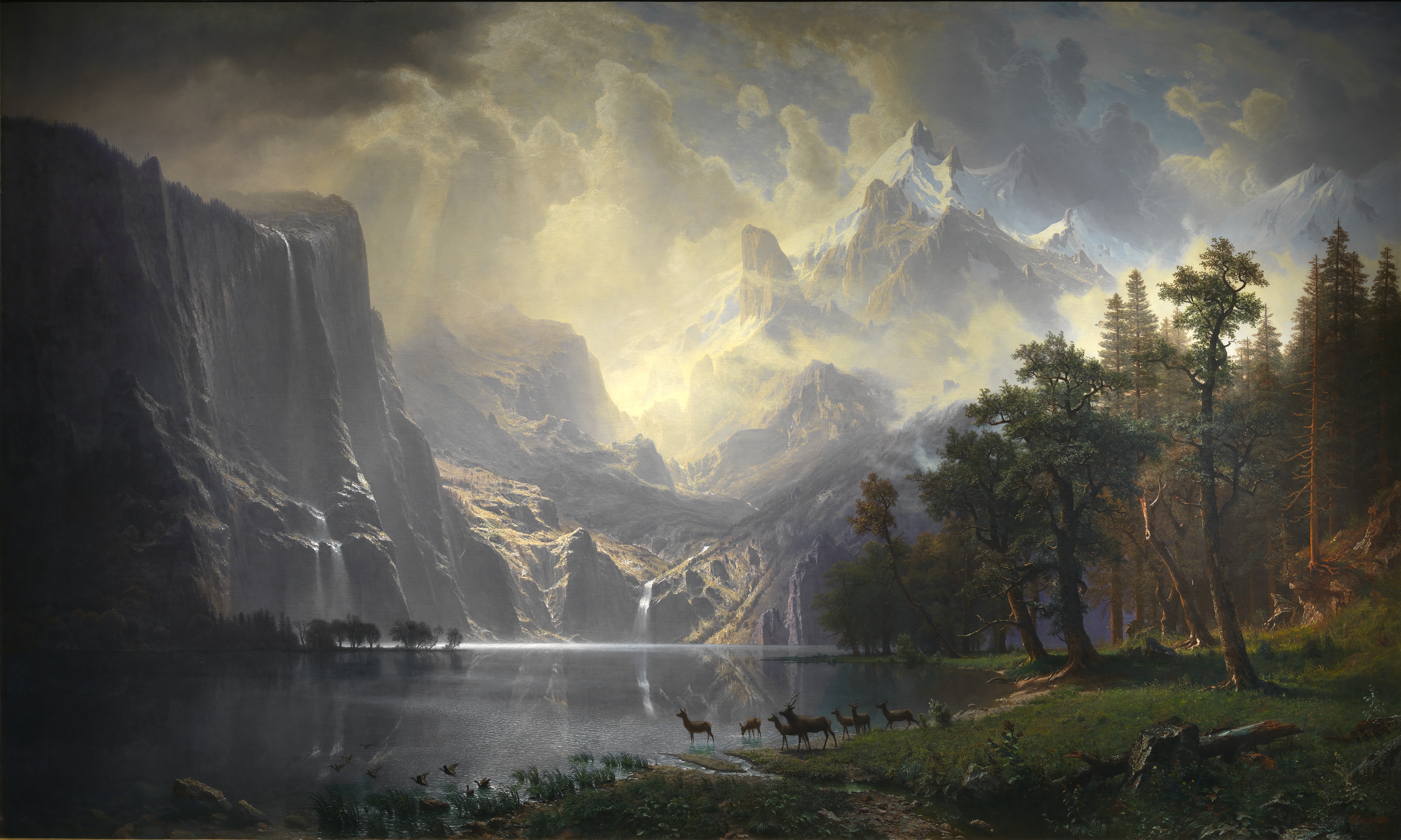
Among the Sierra Nevada, California, 1868, Smithsonian American Art Museum, Washington, D.C.

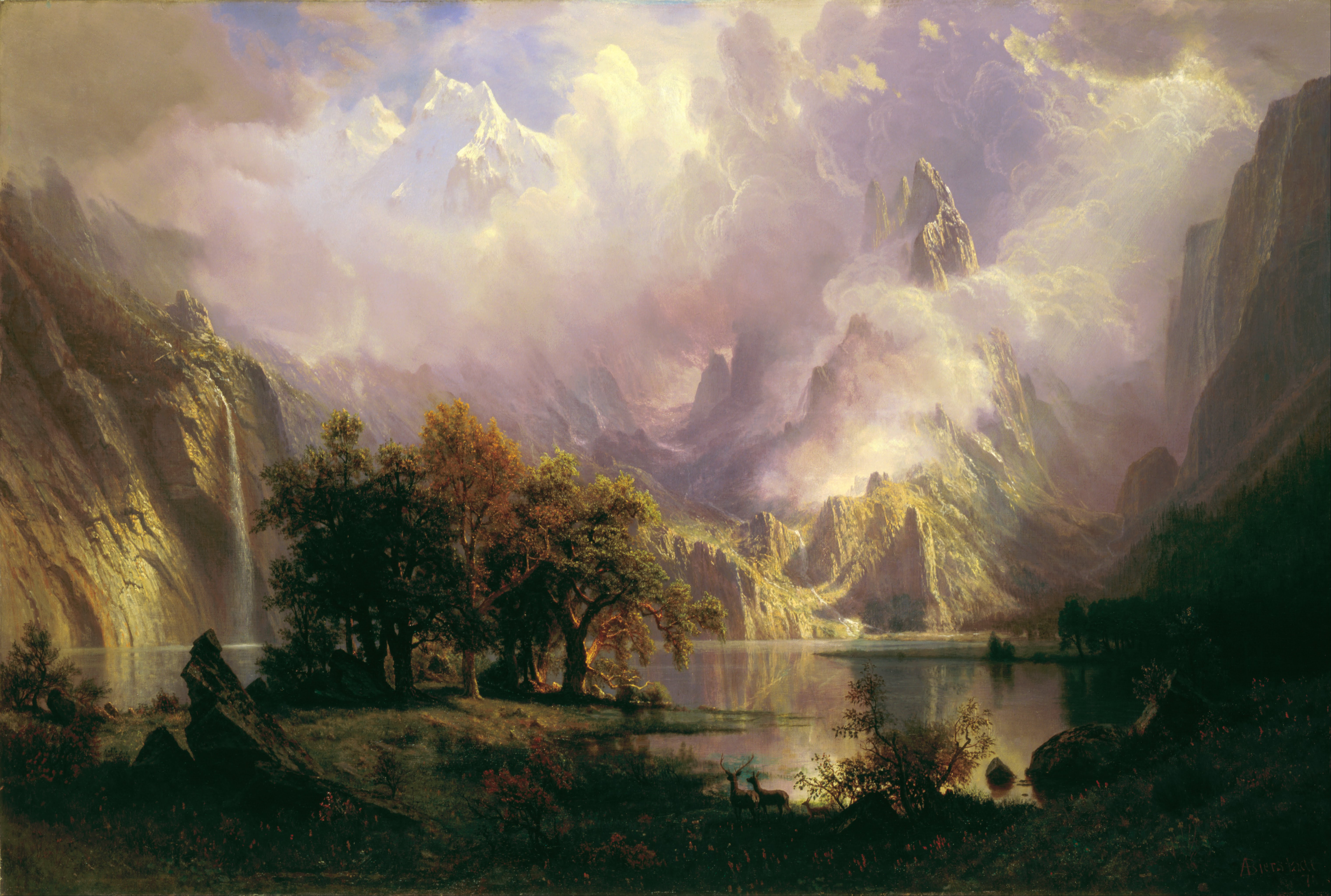
Rocky Mountain Landscape, 1870, White House, Washington, D.C.

In 1858, Bierstadt exhibited a large painting of a Swiss landscape at the National Academy of Design, which gained him positive critical reception and honorary membership of the Academy. Bierstadt began painting scenes in New England and upstate New York, including in the Hudson River Valley. He was part of a group of artists known as the Hudson River School.

In 1859, Bierstadt traveled westward in the company of Frederick W. Lander, a land surveyor for the U.S. government, to see those western American landscapes for his work. He returned to a studio he had taken at the Tenth Street Studio Building in New York with sketches for numerous paintings he then finished. In 1860, he was elected a member of the National Academy of Design; he received medals in Austria, Bavaria, Belgium, and Germany.

In 1863, Bierstadt traveled west again, this time with the author Fitz Hugh Ludlow, whose wife he later married. The pair spent seven weeks in the Yosemite Valley. Throughout the 1860s, Bierstadt used studies from this trip as the source for large-scale exhibition paintings and he continued to visit the American West throughout his career. The immense canvases he produced after his trips with Lander and Ludlow established him as the preeminent painter of the western American landscape. Bierstadt's technical proficiency, earned through his study of European landscape, was crucial to his success as a painter of the American West and accounted for his popularity in disseminating views of the Rocky Mountains to those who had not seen them.

During the American Civil War (1861 to 1865), Bierstadt was drafted in 1863 and paid for a substitute to serve in his place. By 1862, he had completed one Civil War painting Guerrilla Warfare, Civil War based on his brief experiences with soldiers stationed at Camp Cameron in 1861. That painting was based on a stereoscopic photograph taken by his brother Edward Bierstadt, who operated a photography studio at Langley's Tavern in Virginia. The painting received a positive review when it was exhibited at the Brooklyn Art Association at the Brooklyn Academy of Music in December 1861. Curator Eleanor Jones Harvey observed that the painting, created from photographs, "is quintessentially that of a voyeur, privy to the stories and unblemished by the violence and brutality of first-hand combat experience."

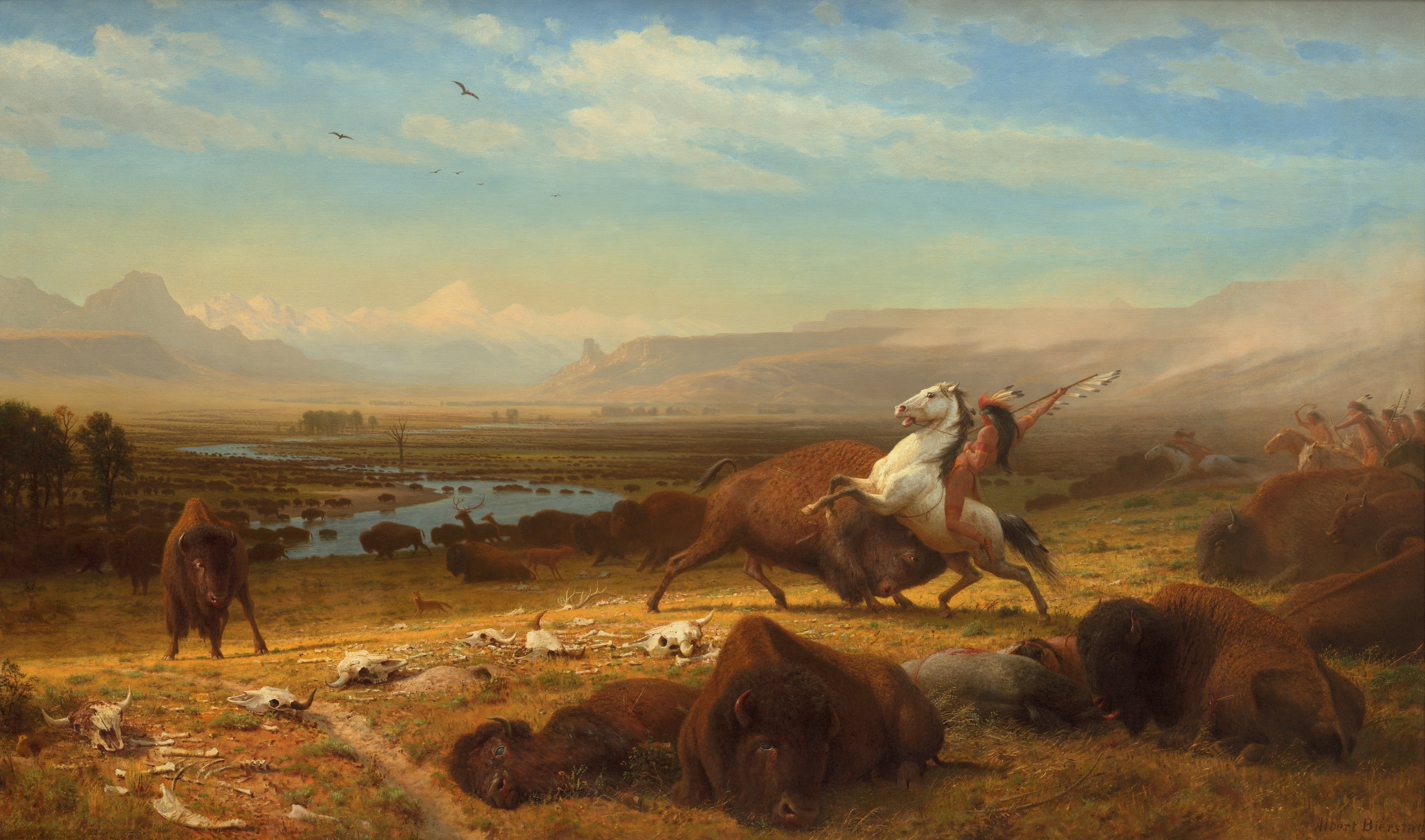
The Last of the Buffalo (1888), National Gallery of Art, Washington, D.C.

Financial recognition confirmed his status: The Rocky Mountains, Lander's Peak, completed in 1863, was purchased for $25,000 in 1865, the equivalent of almost $400,000 in 2020.

In 1867, Bierstadt returned to Europe, arriving in London where he exhibited two landscape paintings in a private reception with Queen Victoria. He then travelled through Europe for the next two years, painting new works while also cultivating social and business contacts to sustain the market for his art on the continent. For example, he painted Among the Sierra Nevada, California in his Rome studio, displaying it in Berlin and London before having it shipped to the U.S. His exhibition pieces both impressed European audiences and furthered the idea of the American West as a land of promise during a period when European emigration to the U.S. was increasing. Bierstadt's choice of grandiose subjects was matched by his entrepreneurial flair. His exhibitions of individual works were accompanied by promotion, ticket sales, and, in the words of one critic, a "vast machinery of advertisement and puffery."

Bierstadt's popularity in the U.S. remained strong during his European tour. The publicity generated by his Yosemite Valley paintings in 1868 led a number of explorers to request his presence as part of their westward expeditions. The Atchison, Topeka, and Santa Fe Railroad also commissioned him to visit and paint the Grand Canyon and surrounding region.

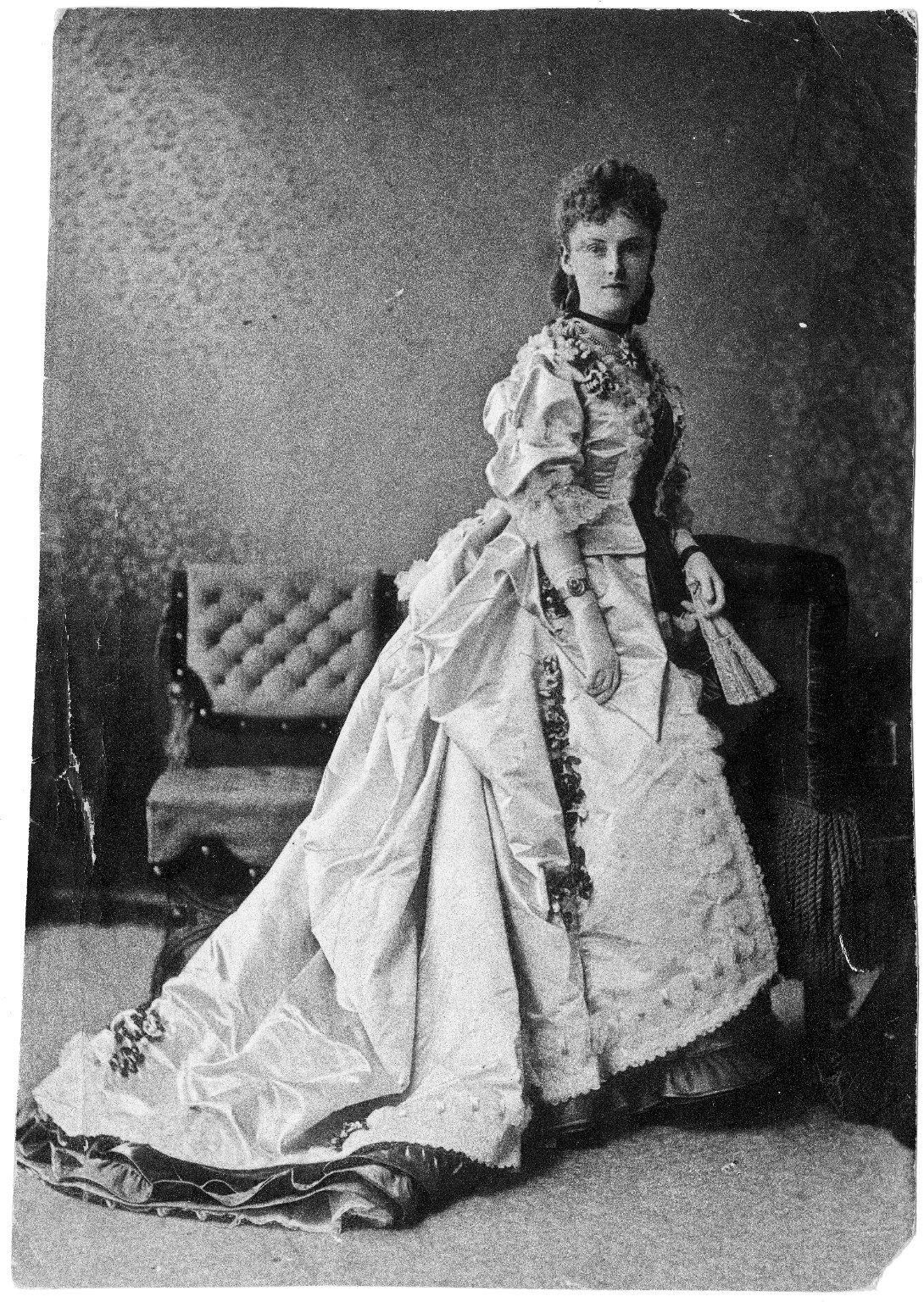
Rosalie Bierstadt, unknown date

Despite his popular success, Bierstadt was criticized by some contemporaries for the romanticism evident in his choice of subjects and for his use of light, which they found excessive. Some critics objected to Bierstadt's paintings of Native Americans, believing that including Indigenous Americans "marred" the "impression of solitary grandeur."

His wife, Rosalie, was diagnosed with tuberculosis in 1876, and Bierstadt spent increasing amounts of time with her in the warmer climate of Nassau in the Bahamas until her death in 1893. He also maintained travel between the western United States, Canada, and his studio in New York.

Though his painting career continued later into his life, Bierstadt's work fell increasingly out of critical favor and was increasingly attacked for its theatrical tone. In 1882, a fire destroyed Bierstadt's studio at Irvington, New York, and, with it, many of his paintings.

Bierstadt was a prolific artist, having completed over 500 paintings during his lifetime. Yet by the time of his death on February 18, 1902, the taste for epic landscape painting had long since subsided. Bierstadt was buried at the Rural Cemetery in New Bedford, Massachusetts, and remained largely forgotten for nearly 60 years.

== Legacy ==
Interest in Bierstadt's work was renewed in the 1960s with the exhibition of his small oil studies. Modern opinions of Bierstadt have been divided. Some critics have regarded his work as gaudy, oversized, extravagant champions of Manifest Destiny. Others have noted that his landscapes helped create support for the conservation movement and the establishment of Yellowstone National Park. His work has been placed in a favorable context, as stated in 1987:

The temptation (to criticize him) should be steadfastly resisted. Bierstadt's theatrical art, fervent sociability, international outlook, and unquenchable personal energy reflected the epic expansion in every facet of Western civilization during the second half of the nineteenth century.

On the other hand, his work has also been criticized as largely an imaginary depiction of nature, and even "soulless" in its execution.

== Existing work ==
- 1853 – Majesty of the Mountains
- 1855 – The Old Mill
- 1855 – The Portico of Octavia
- 1855 – Westphalia
- 1858 – Lake Lucerne, c. 1853, oil on canvas, National Gallery of Art, Washington, D.C.
- 1859 – The Wolf River, Kansas, c. 1859, oil on canvas, Detroit Institute of Arts, Detroit, Michigan
- 1861 – Echo Lake, Franconia Mountains, NH, Smith College Museum of Art, Smith College, Northampton, Massachusetts
- 1863 – The Rocky Mountains, Lander's Peak, oil on canvas, Metropolitan Museum of Art, New York City, New York
- 1864 – Cho-looke, the Yosemite Fall, oil on canvas, Timken Museum of Art, San Diego, California
- 1864 – Valley of the Yosemite, oil on paper, Museum of Fine Arts, Boston, Massachusetts
- 1865 – Looking Down Yosemite Valley, Birmingham Museum of Art, Alabama
- 1866 – Yosemite Valley, Oil on canvas on panel-back stretcher, Cleveland Museum of Art, Cleveland, Ohio
- 1866 – On the Hudson River Near Irvington, 1866–70, oil on paper, Berkshire Museum, Pittsfield, Massachusetts
- 1866 – A Storm in the Rocky Mountains, Mt. Rosalie, oil on canvas, Brooklyn Museum, New York City, New York
- 1868 – Connecticut River Valley, Claremont, New Hampshire, 1868, oil on canvas, Berkshire Museum, Pittsfield, Massachusetts
- 1868 – In the Sierras, Fogg Museum, Harvard University, Cambridge, Massachusetts
- 1868 – Among the Sierra Nevada, California, Smithsonian American Art Museum, Washington, D.C.
- 1869 – Glen Ellis Falls, oil on canvas, Zimmerli Art Museum, New Brunswick, New Jersey
- 1870 – Sierra Nevada Morning, oil on canvas, Gilcrease Museum, Tulsa, Oklahoma
- 1870 – Puget Sound on the Pacific Coast, oil on canvas, Seattle Art Museum, Seattle, Washington
- 1870 – Laramie Peak, oil on canvas, Buffalo AKG Art Museum, Buffalo, New York
- 1871 – Domes of Yosemite, c. 1871, St. Johnsbury Athenaeum, St. Johnsbury, Vermont
- 1874 – Giant Redwood Trees of California, c. 1874, oil on canvas, Berkshire Museum, Pittsfield, Massachusetts
- 1875 – Mount Adams, Washington, 1875, oil on canvas, Princeton University Art Museum, Princeton, New Jersey
- 1876 – Mount Corcoran, c. 1876–77, oil on canvas, Corcoran Gallery of Art, Washington, D.C.
- 1888 – The Last of the Buffalo, oil on canvas, Corcoran Gallery of Art, Washington, D.C.
- 1889 – Alaskan Coast Range, c. 1889, Smithsonian American Art Museum, Washington, D.C.
- 1891 – The Last of the Buffalo, c. 1891, vintage photogravure, Valley Fine Art Gallery, Aspen, Colorado
- 1895 – The Morteratsch Glacier Upper Engadine Valley – Pontresina

== Selected paintings ==
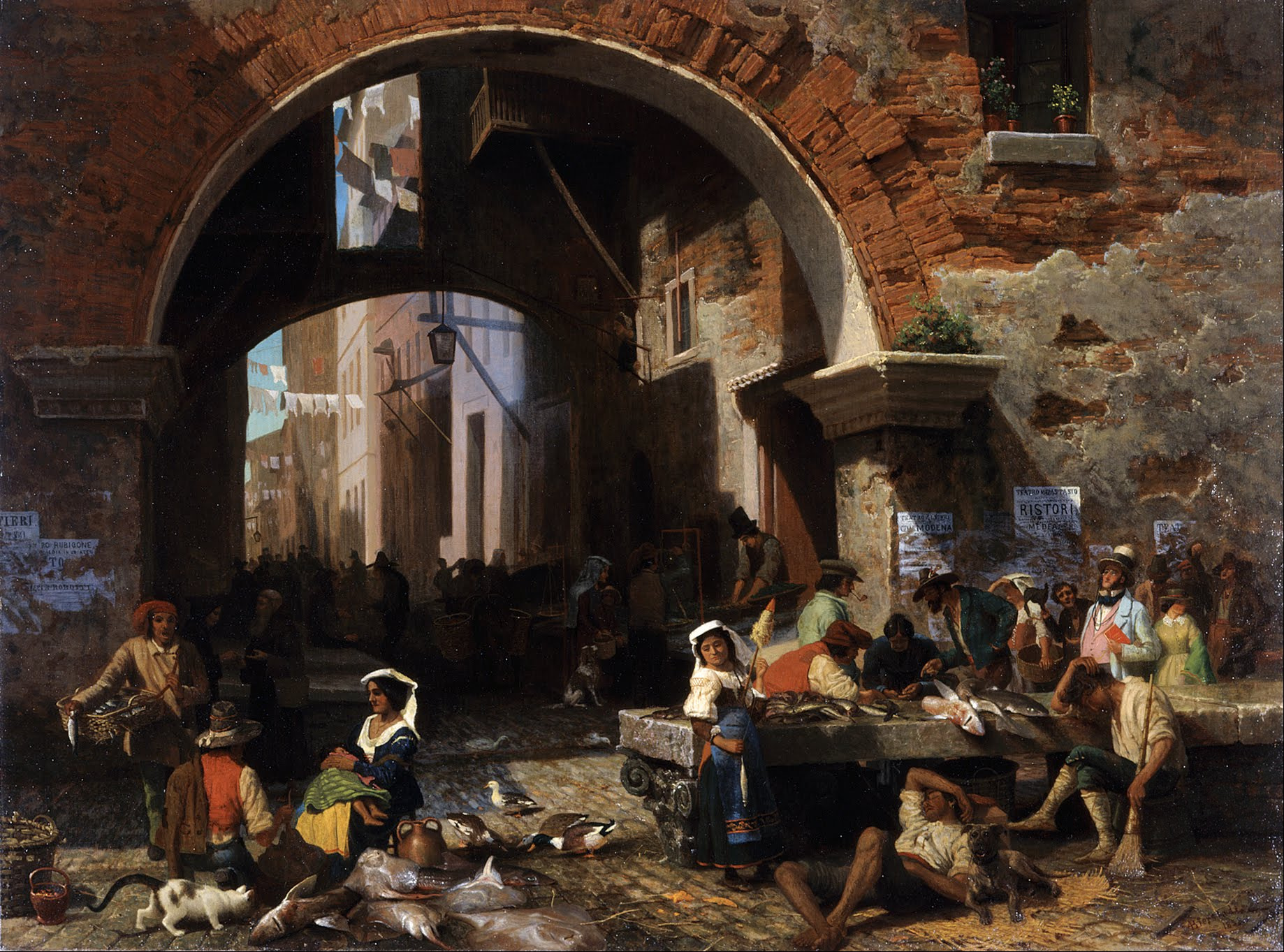
Roman Fish Market, Arch of Octavius, 1858, De Young Museum, San Francisco, California

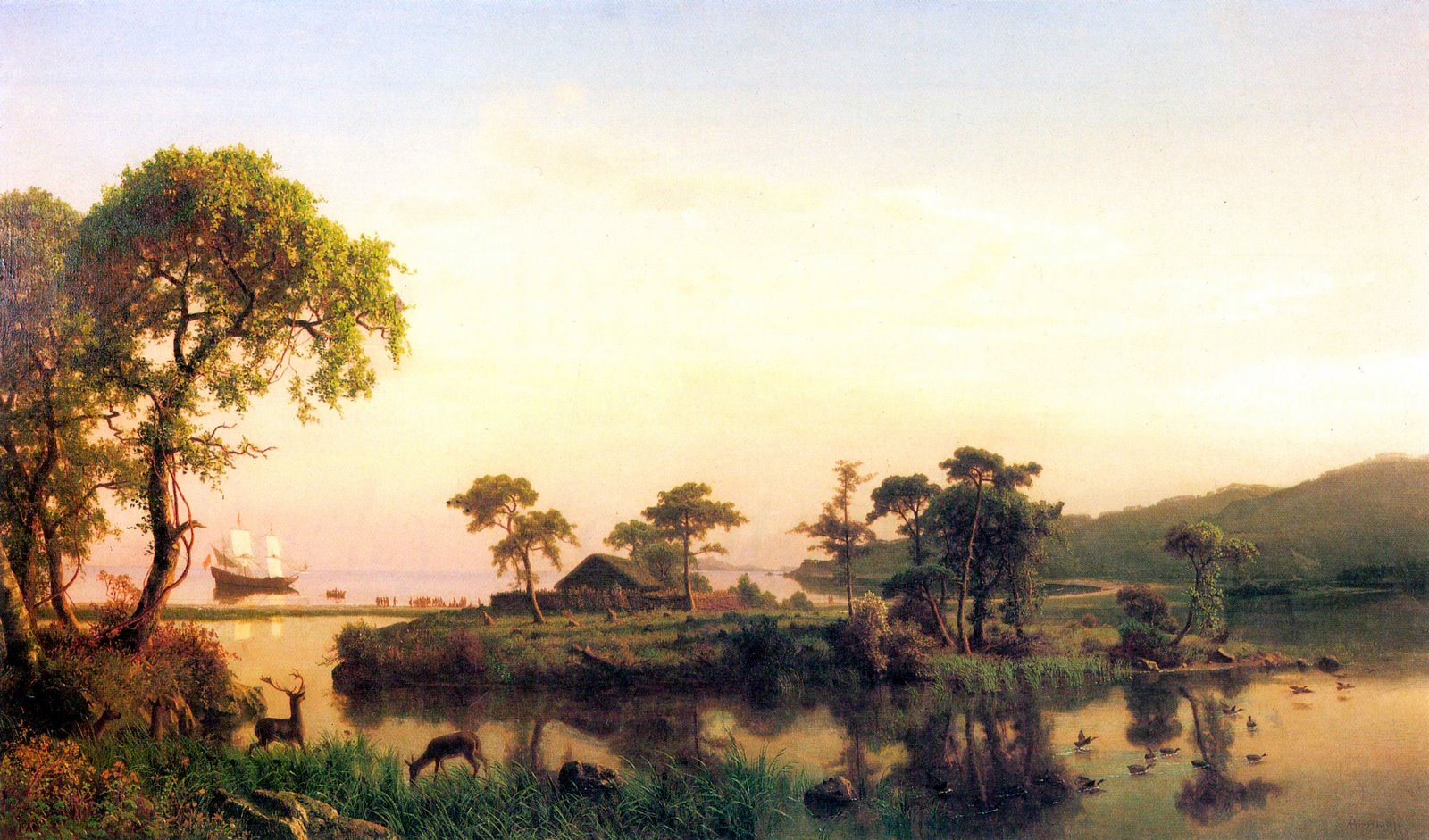
Gosnold at Cuttyhunk, c. 1858, New Bedford Whaling Museum, New Bedford, Massachusetts

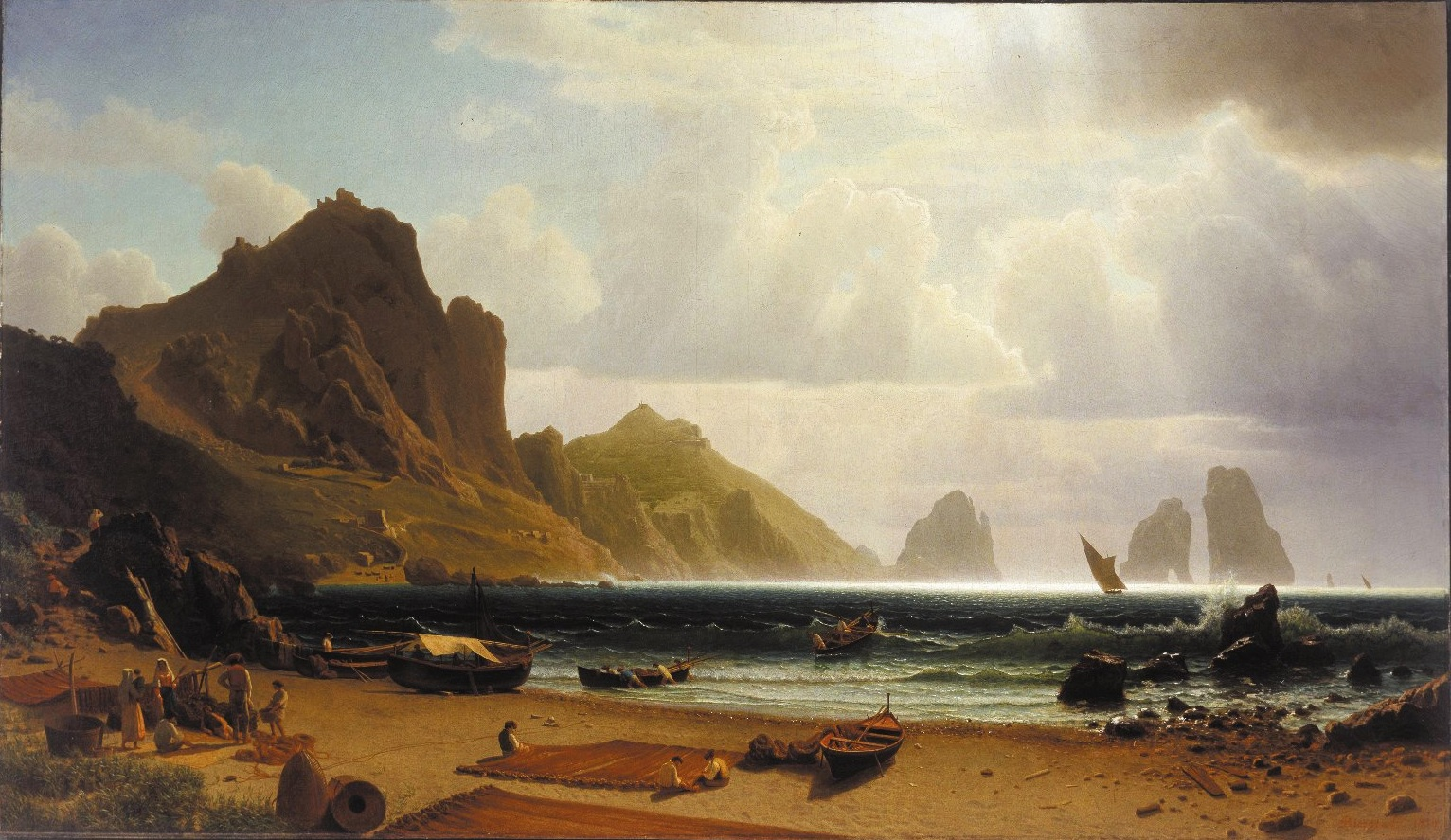
The Marina Piccola, Capri, 1859, Albright-Knox Art Gallery, Buffalo, New York

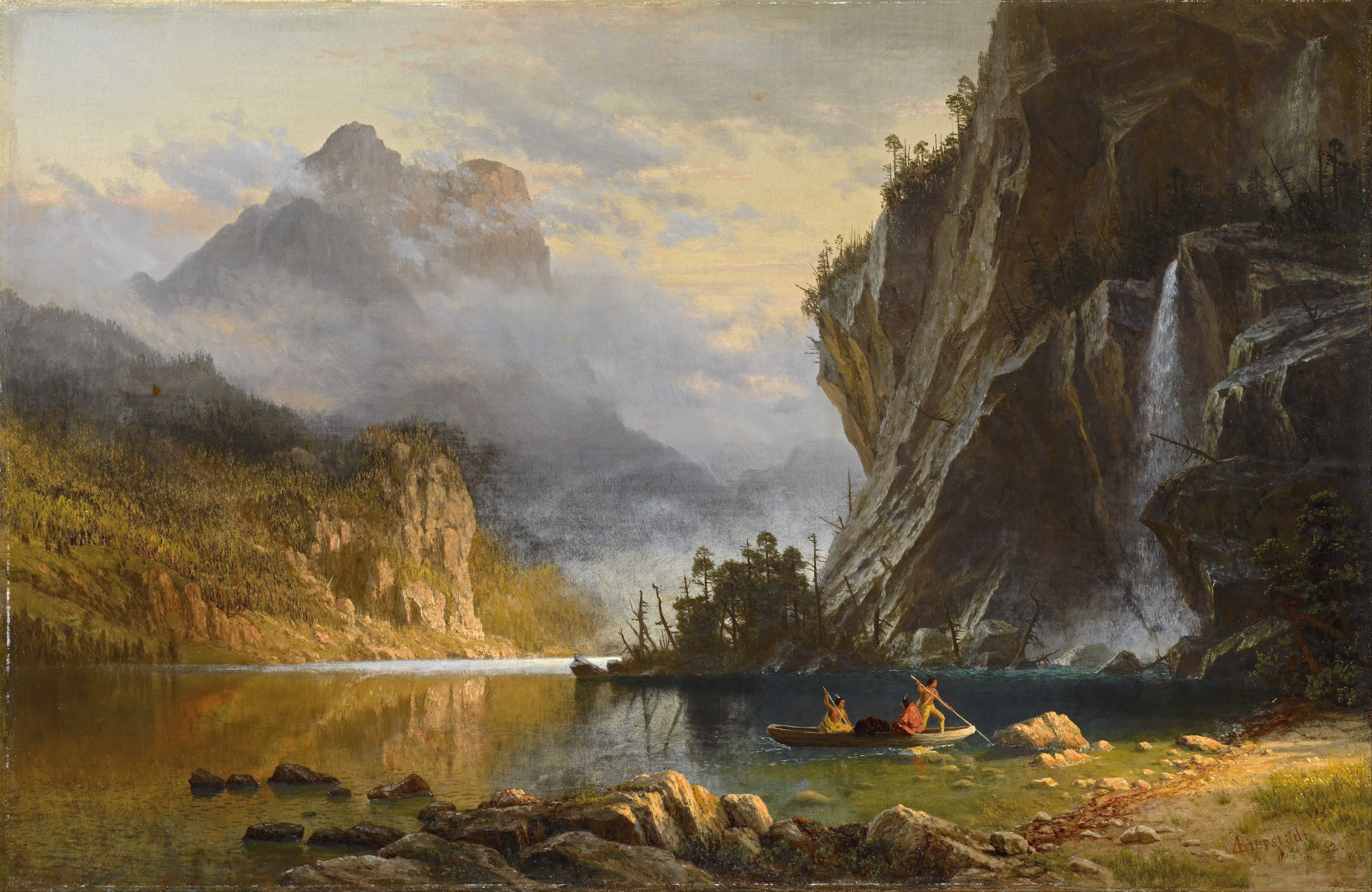
Indians Spear Fishing, 1862, Museum of Fine Arts, Houston, Texas

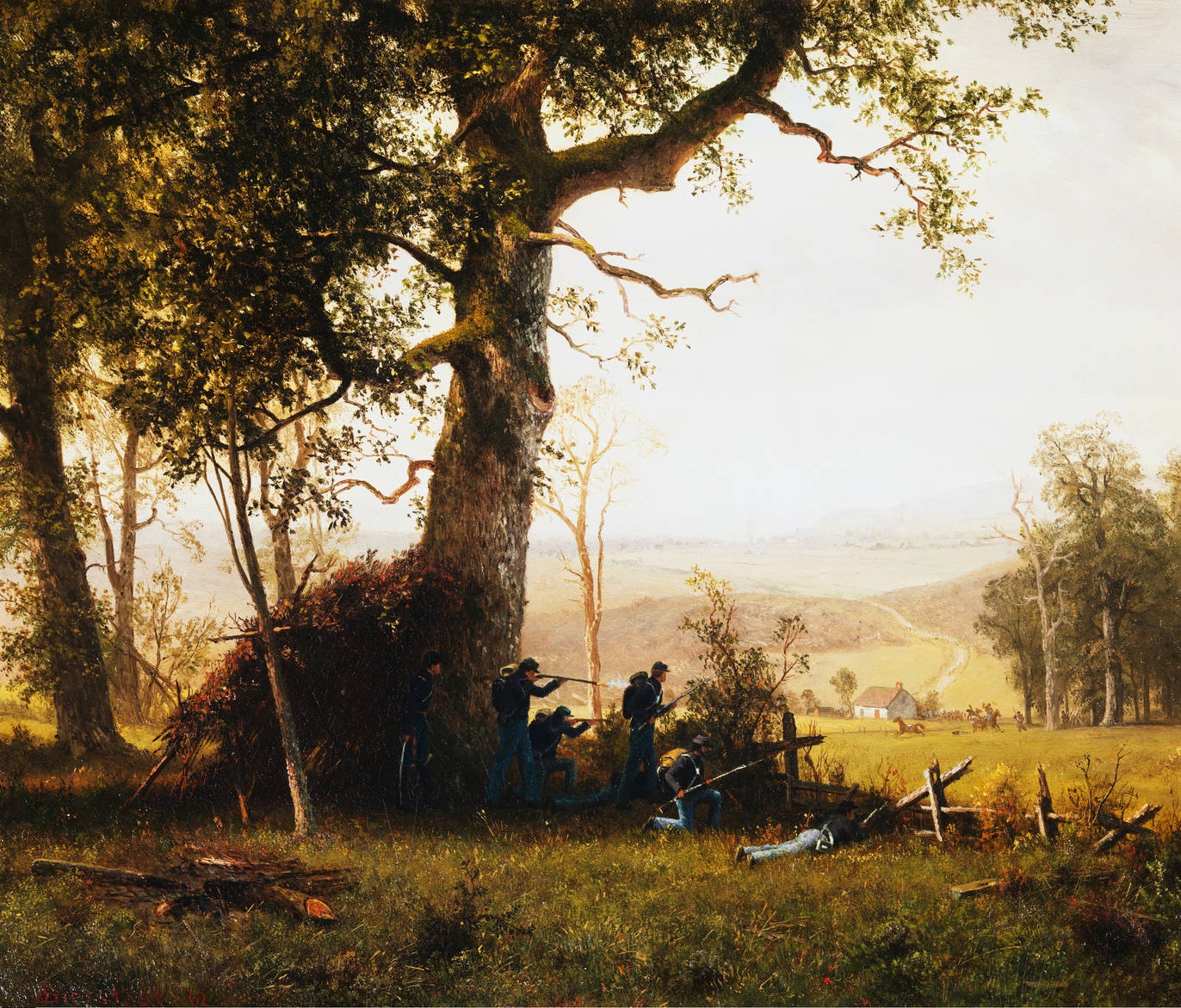
Guerilla Warfare, Civil War, 1862, Century Association, New York City

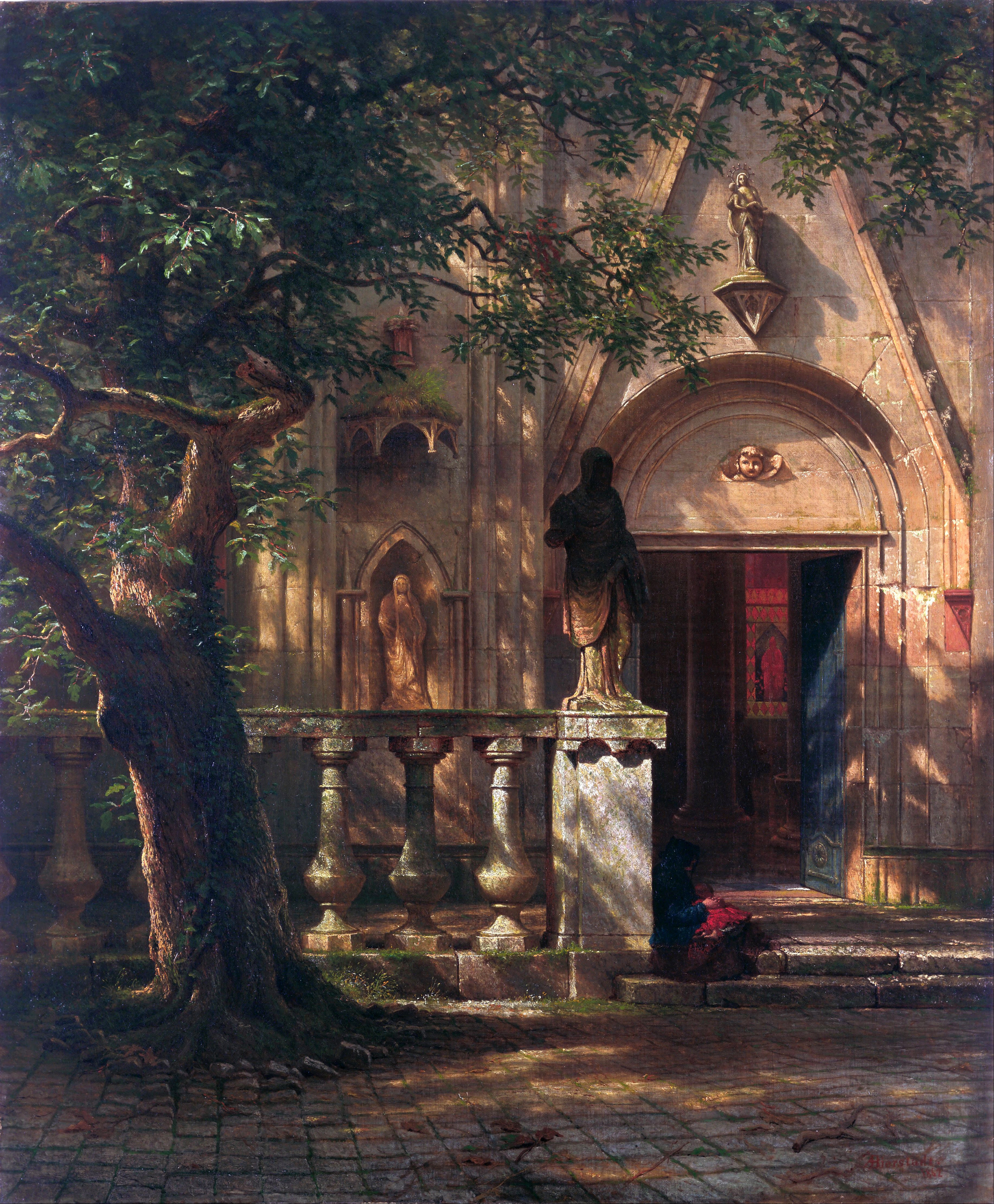
Sunlight and Shadow, 1862, De Young Museum, San Francisco, California

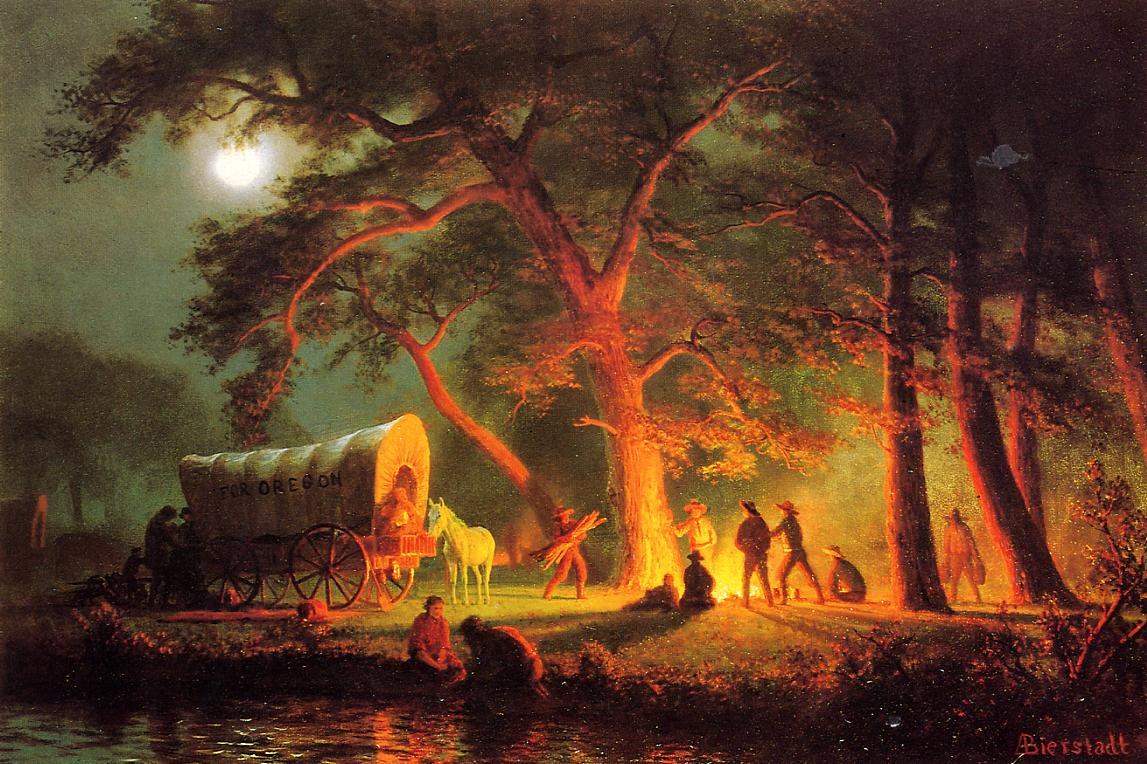
Oregon Trail (Campfire), 1863

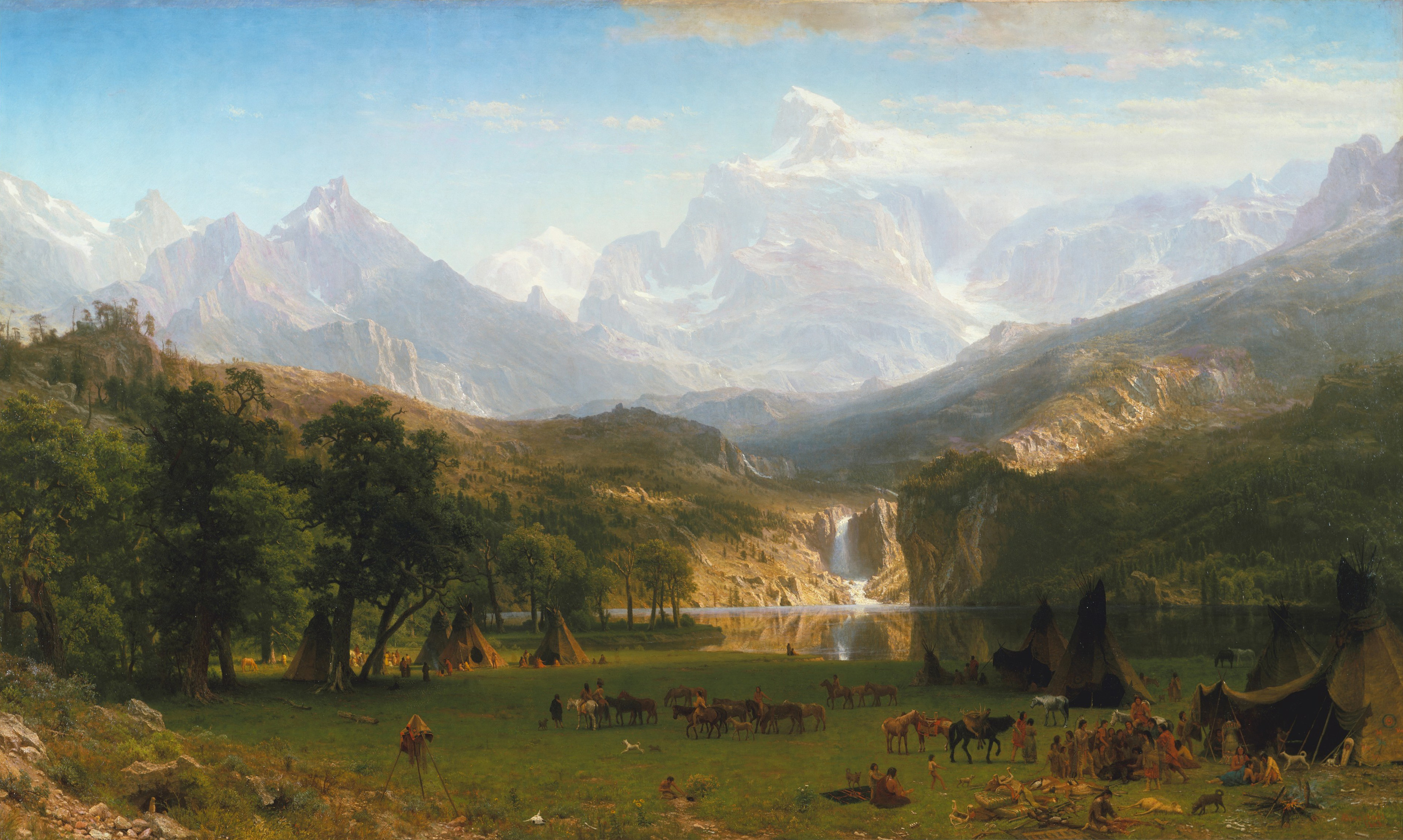
The Rocky Mountains, Lander's Peak, 1863, Metropolitan Museum of Art, New York City

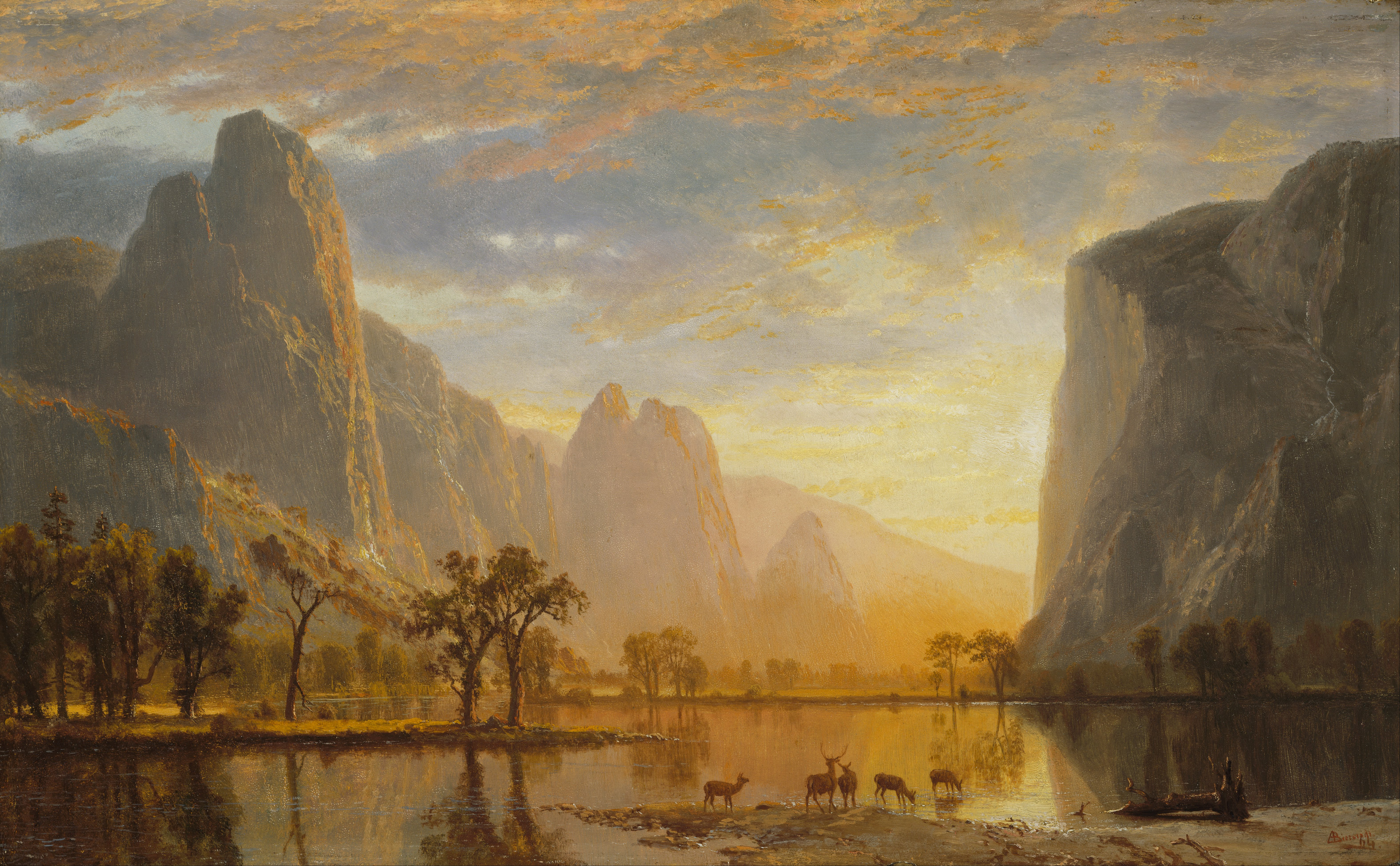
Valley of the Yosemite, 1864, Museum of Fine Arts, Boston, Massachusetts

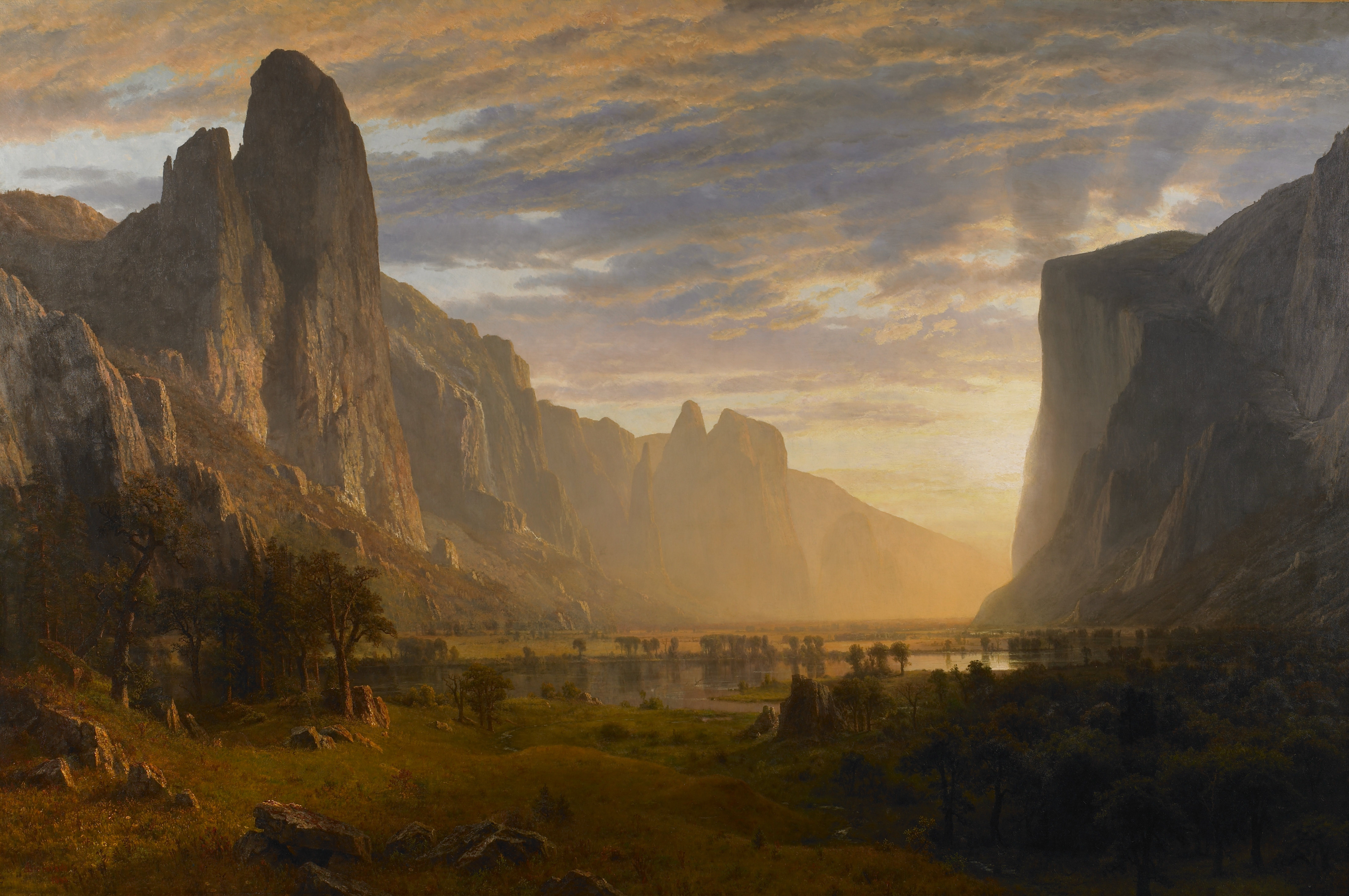
Looking Down Yosemite Valley, California, 1865, Birmingham Museum of Art, Alabama

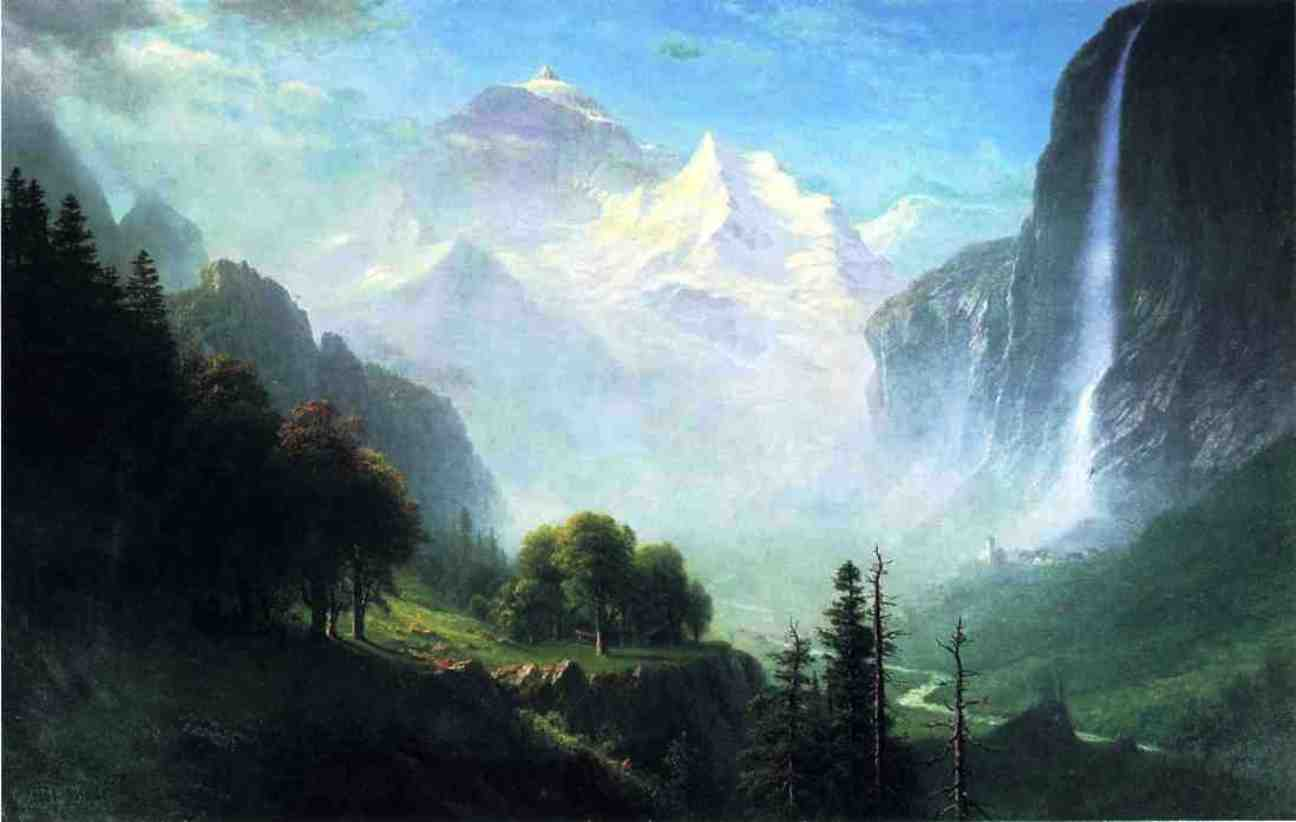
Staubbach Falls, Near Lauterbrunnen, Switzerland, 1865

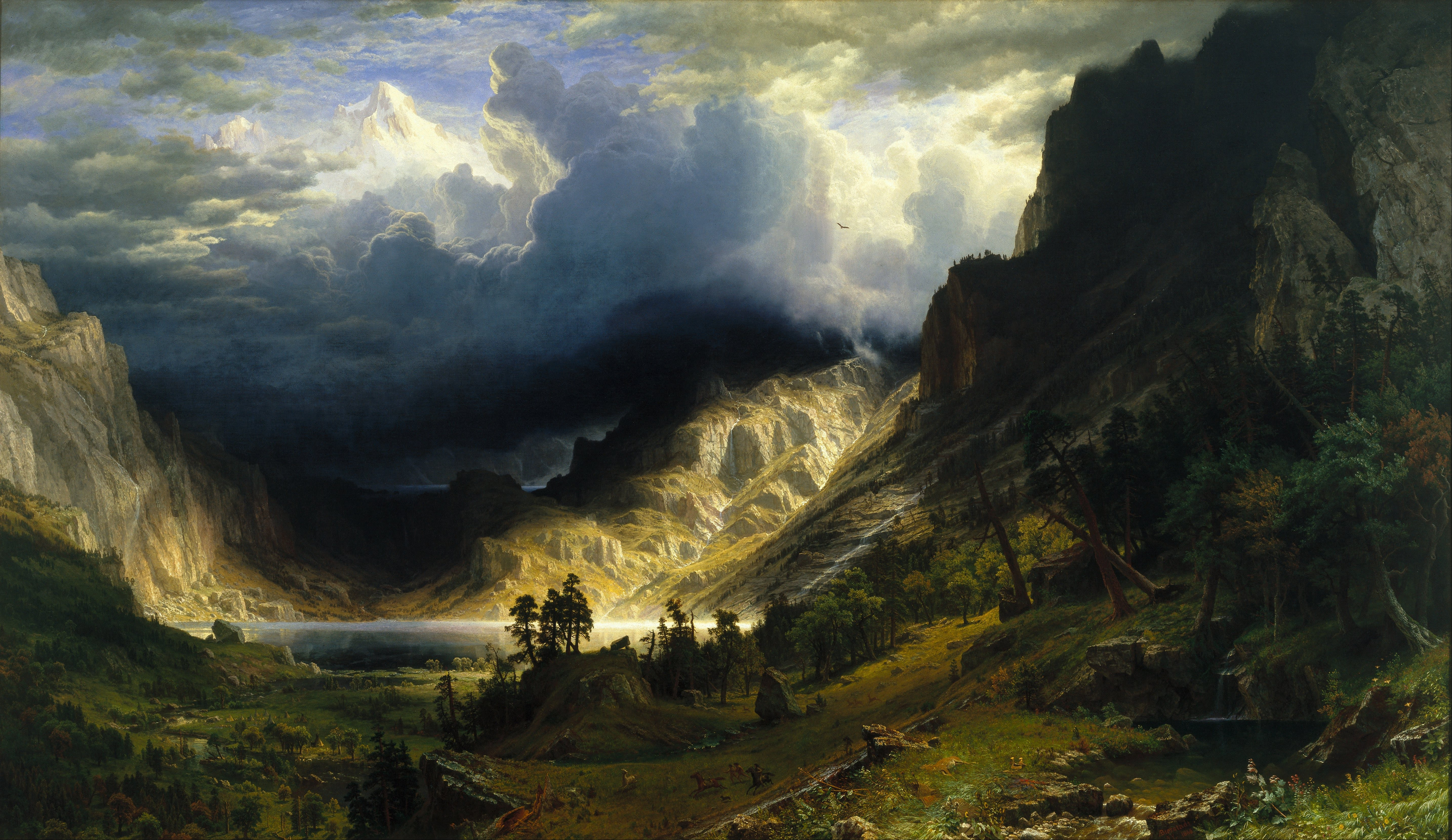
A Storm in the Rocky Mountains, Mt. Rosalie, 1866, Brooklyn Museum, New York City

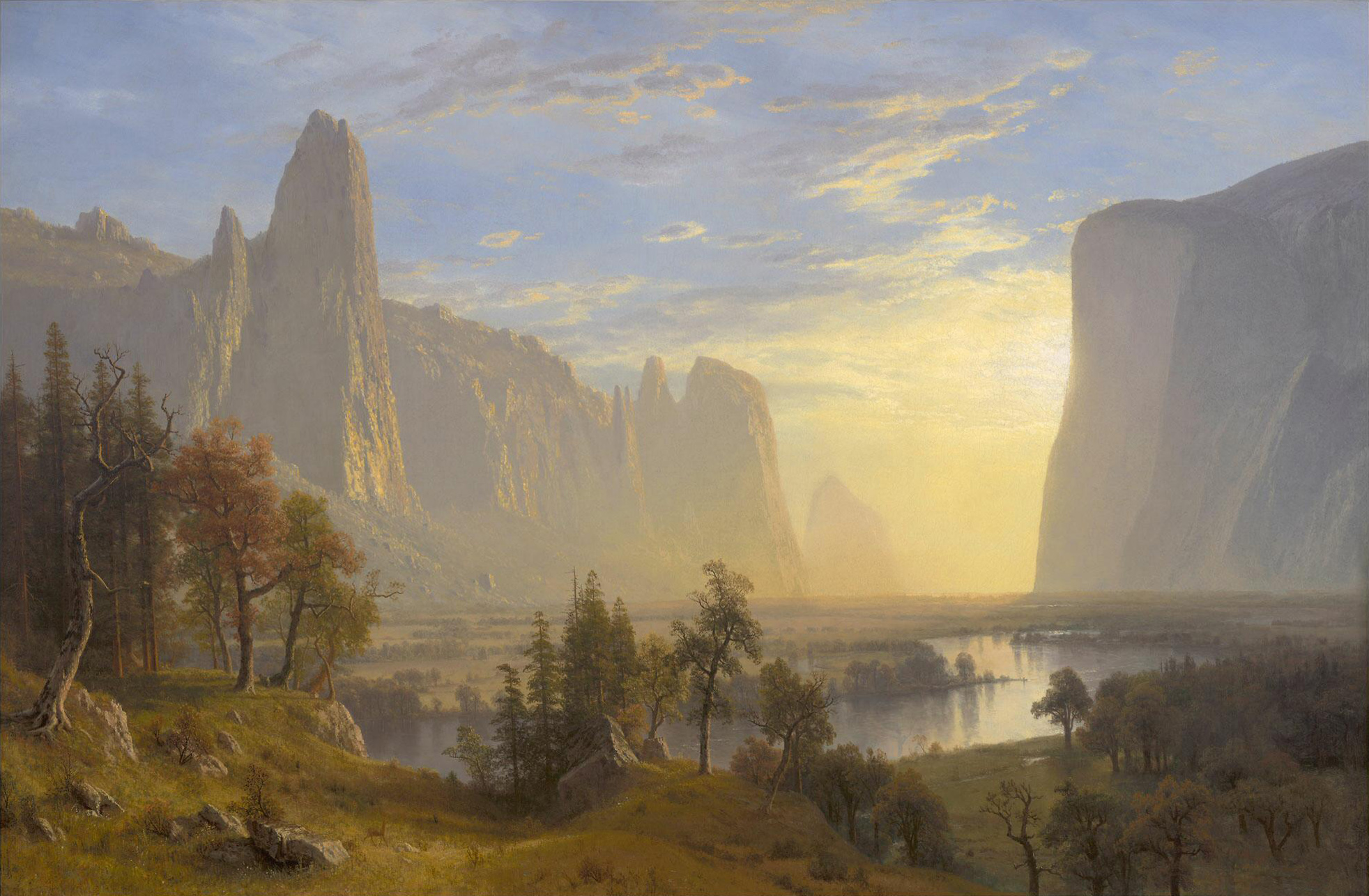
Yosemite Valley, Yosemite Park, c. 1868, Oakland Museum, California

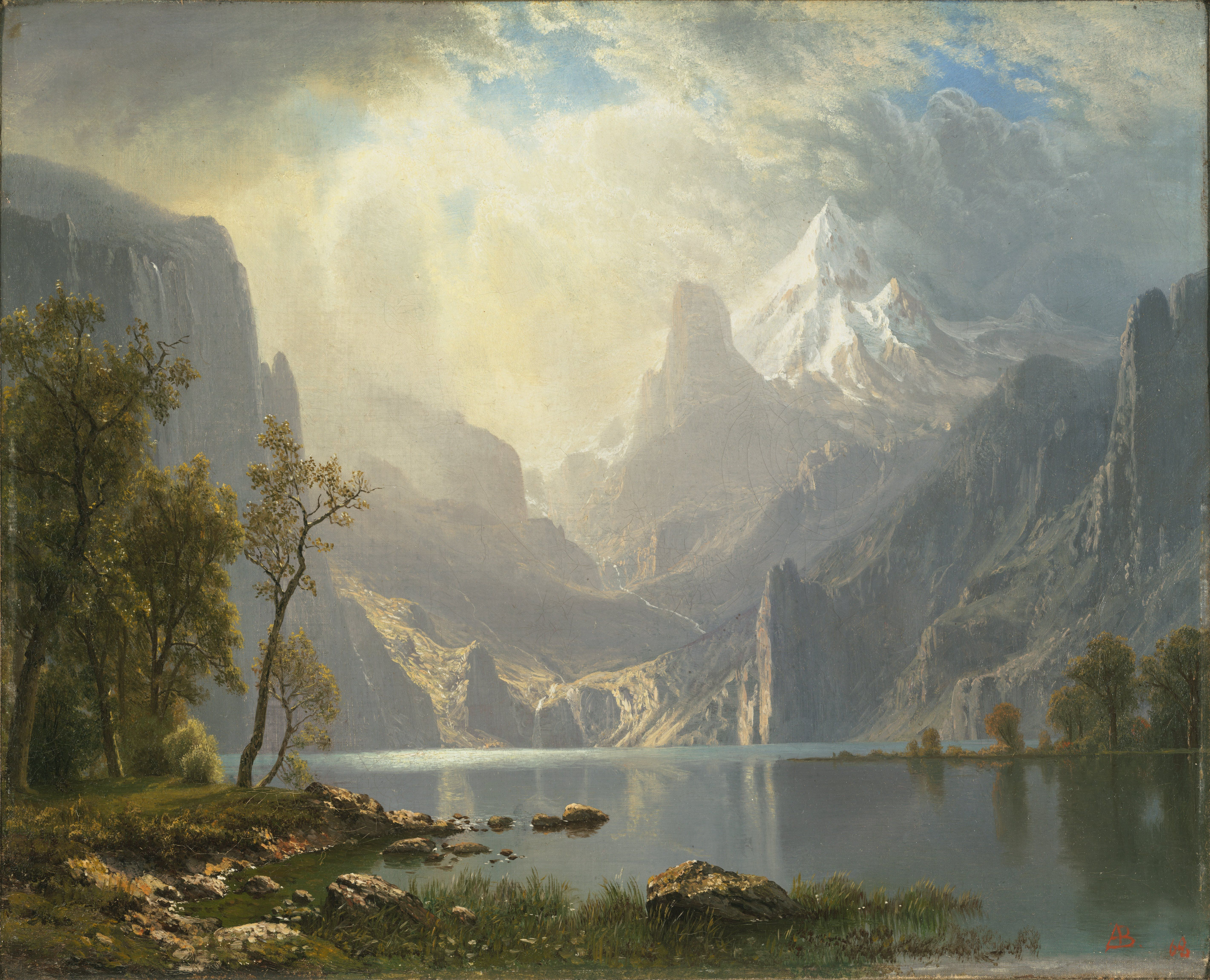
Lake Tahoe, 1868, Fogg Art Museum, Cambridge, Massachusetts

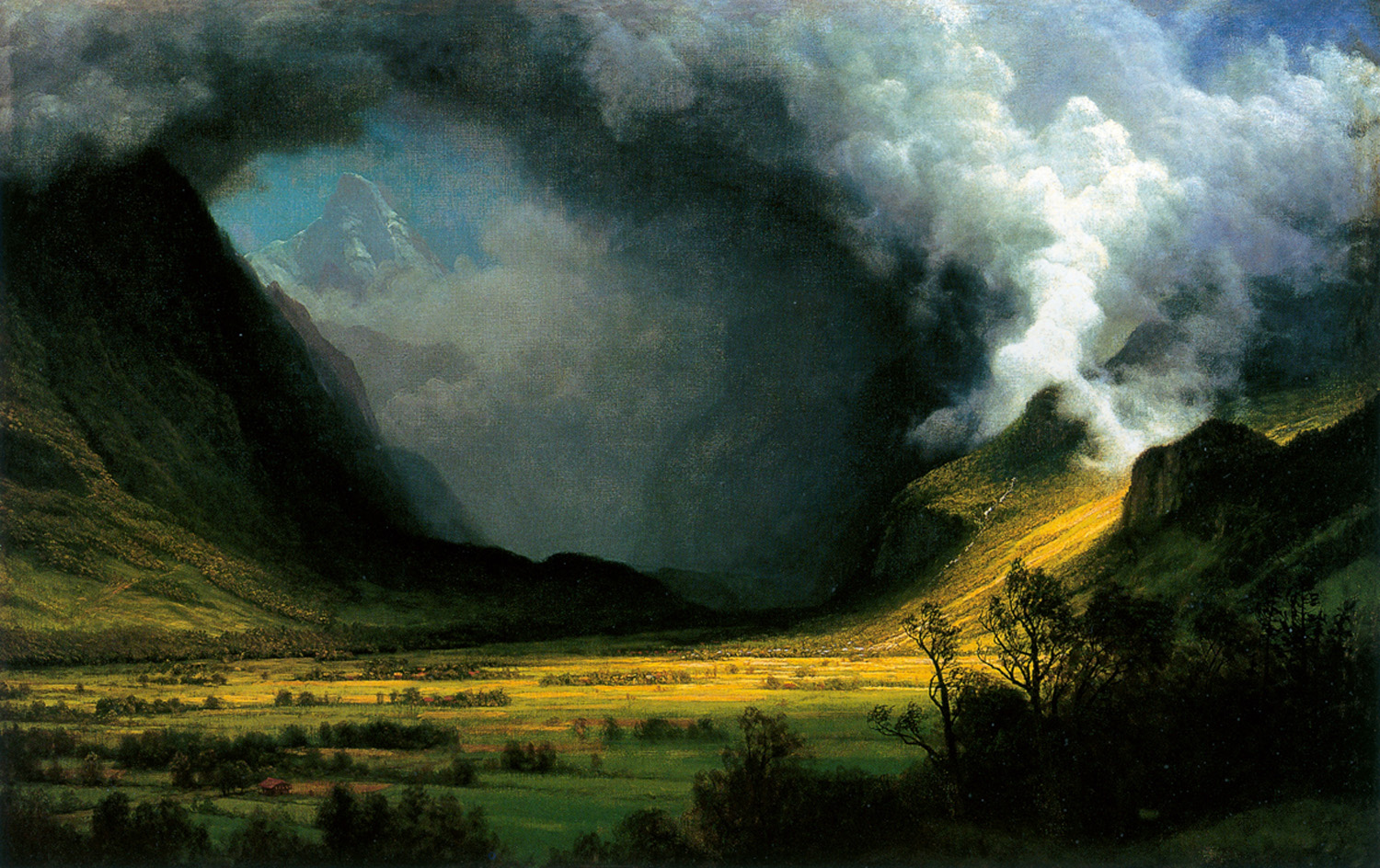
Storm in the Mountains, c. 1870, Museum of Fine Art, Boston, Massachusetts

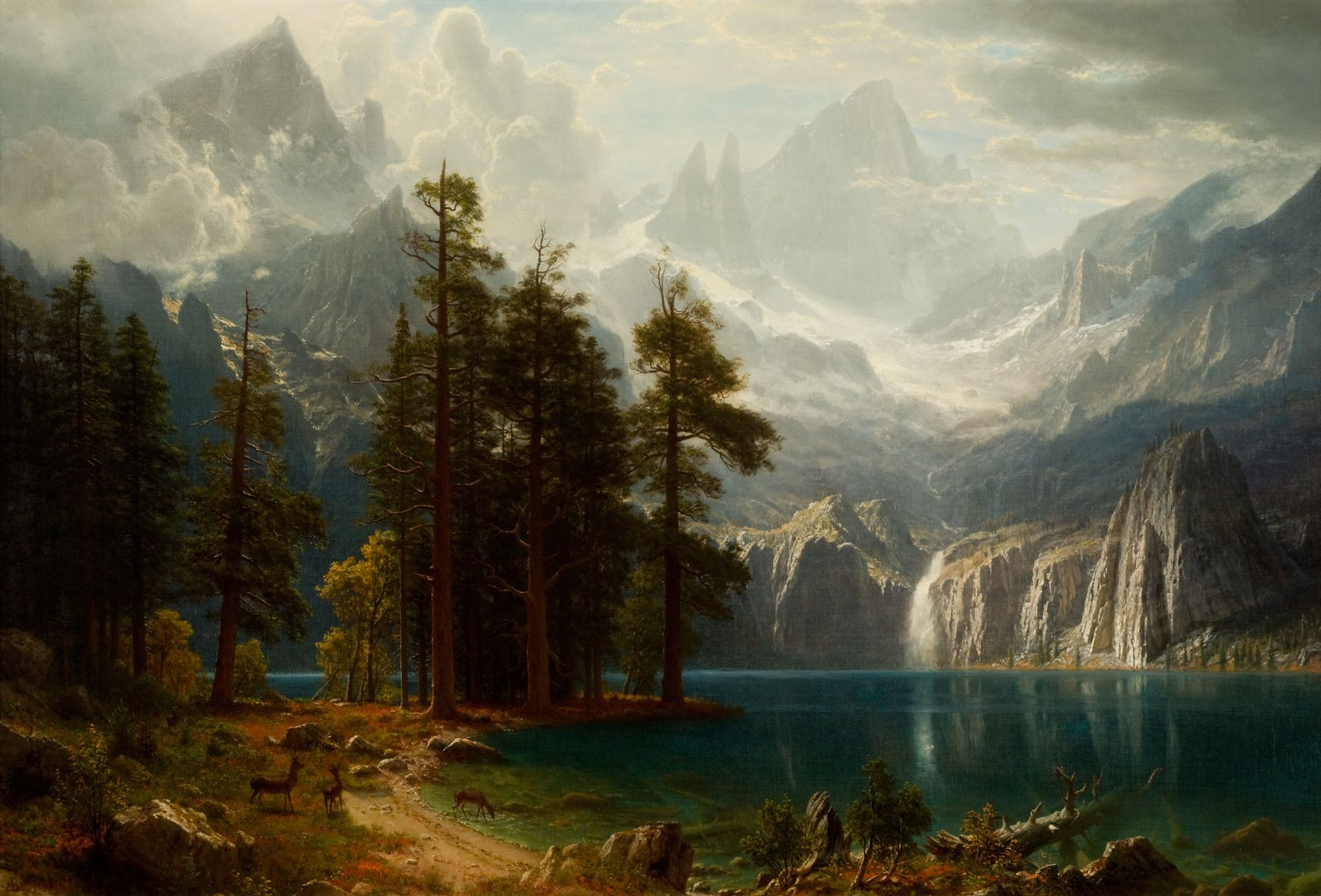
Sierra Nevada, c. 1871–1873, Reynolda House Museum of American Art, Winston-Salem, North Carolina

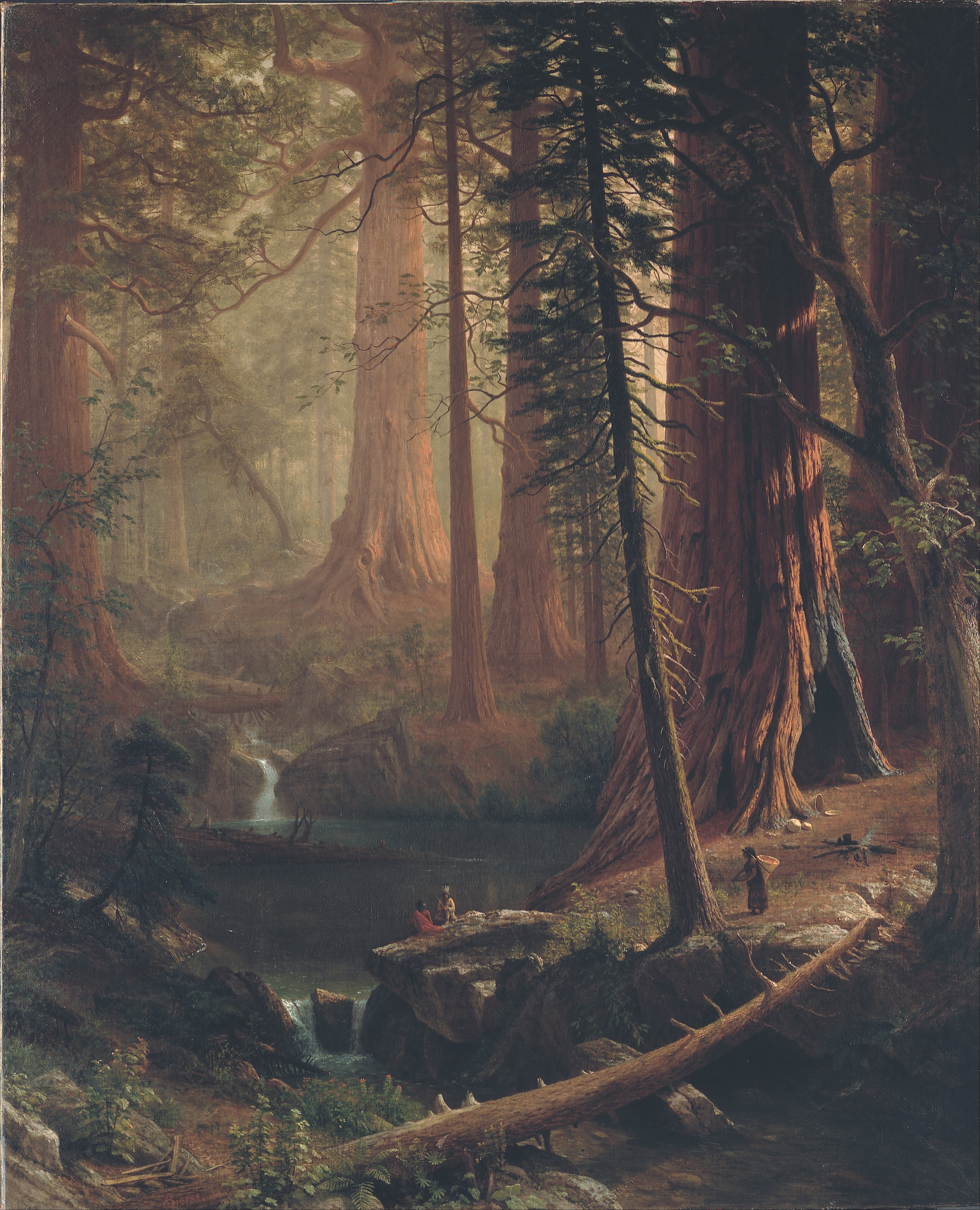
Giant Redwood Trees of California, 1874, Berkshire Museum, Massachusetts

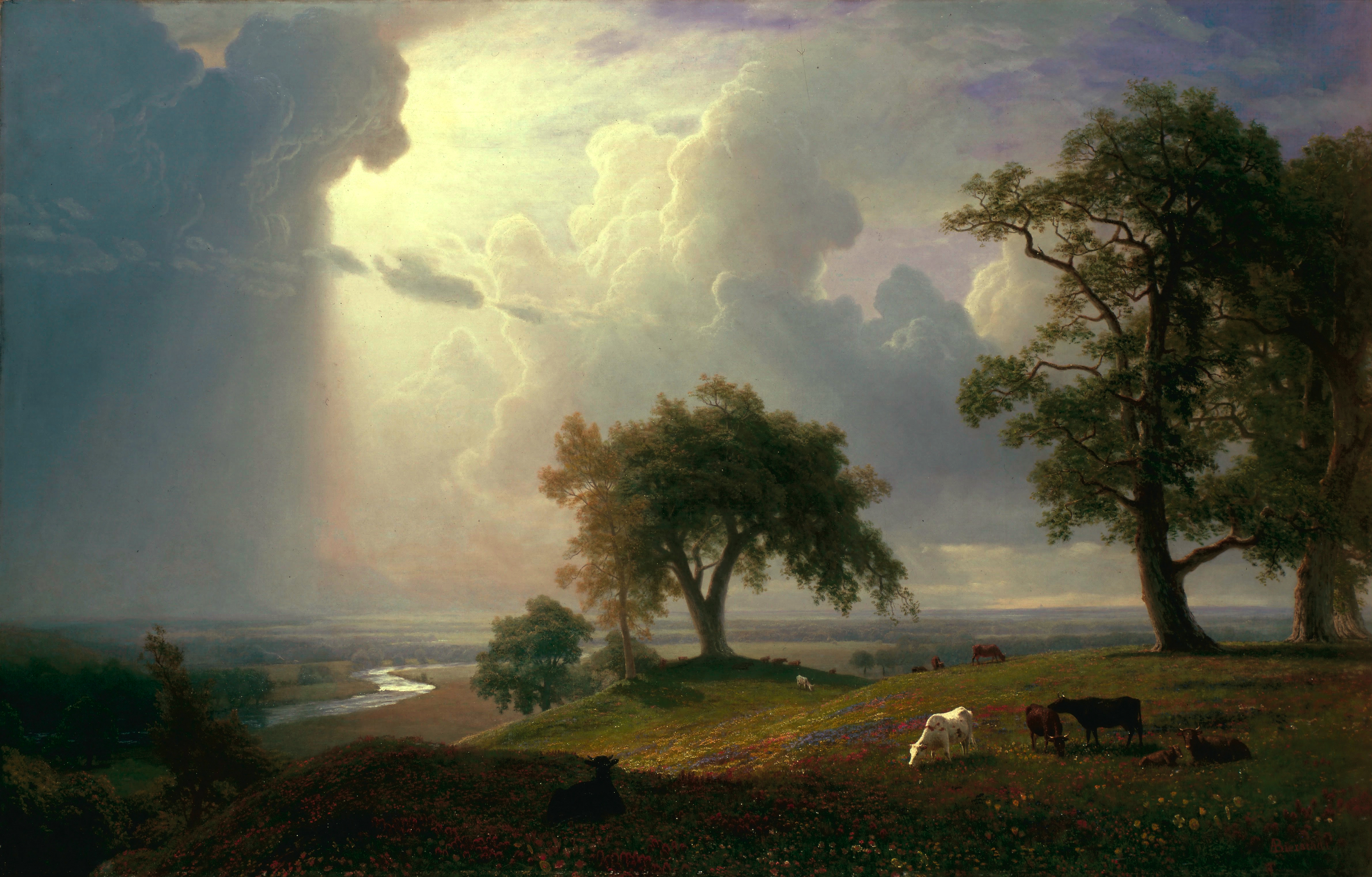
California Spring, 1875, De Young Museum, San Francisco, California

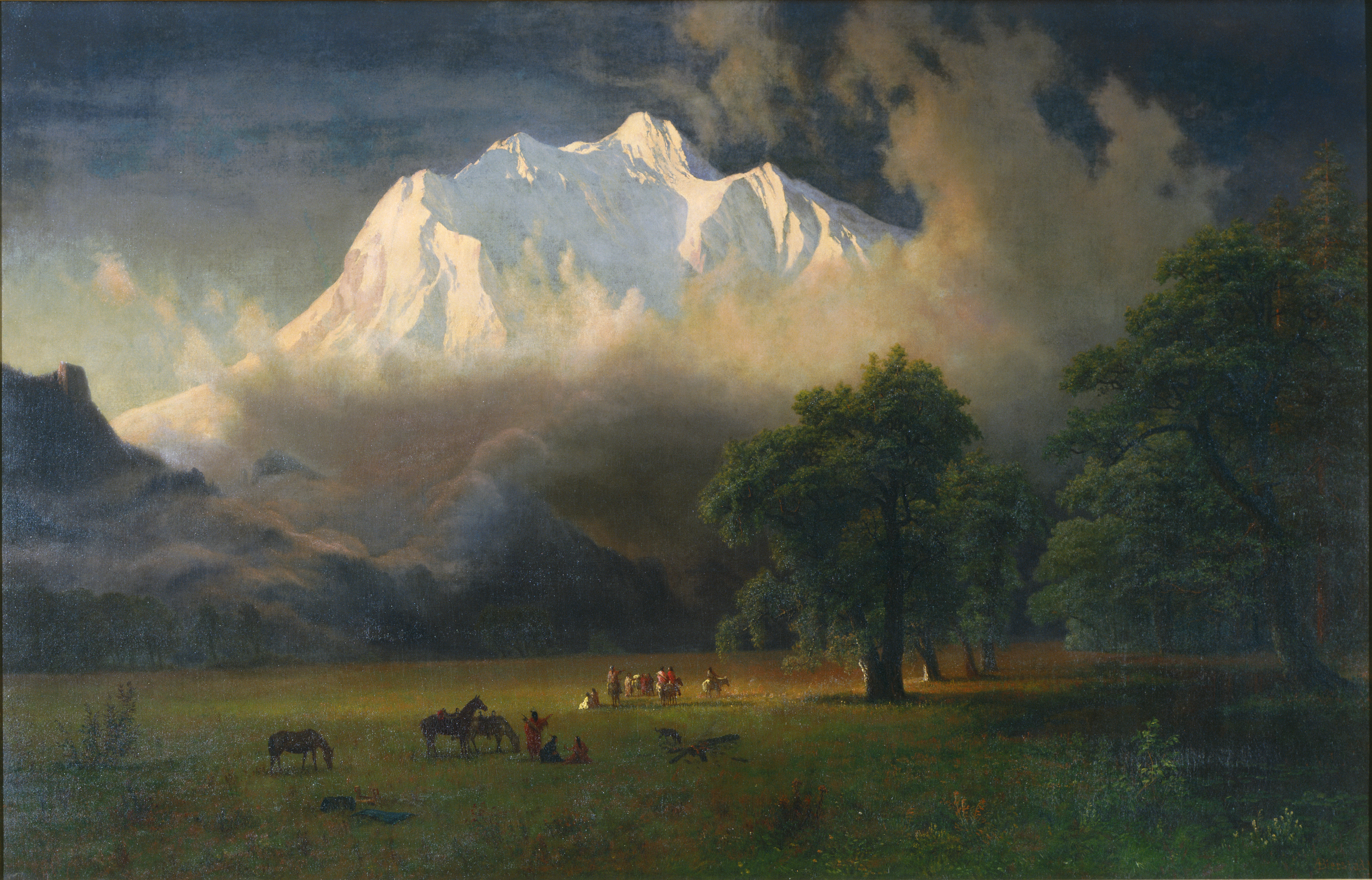
Mount Adams, Washington, 1875, Princeton University Art Museum, New Jersey

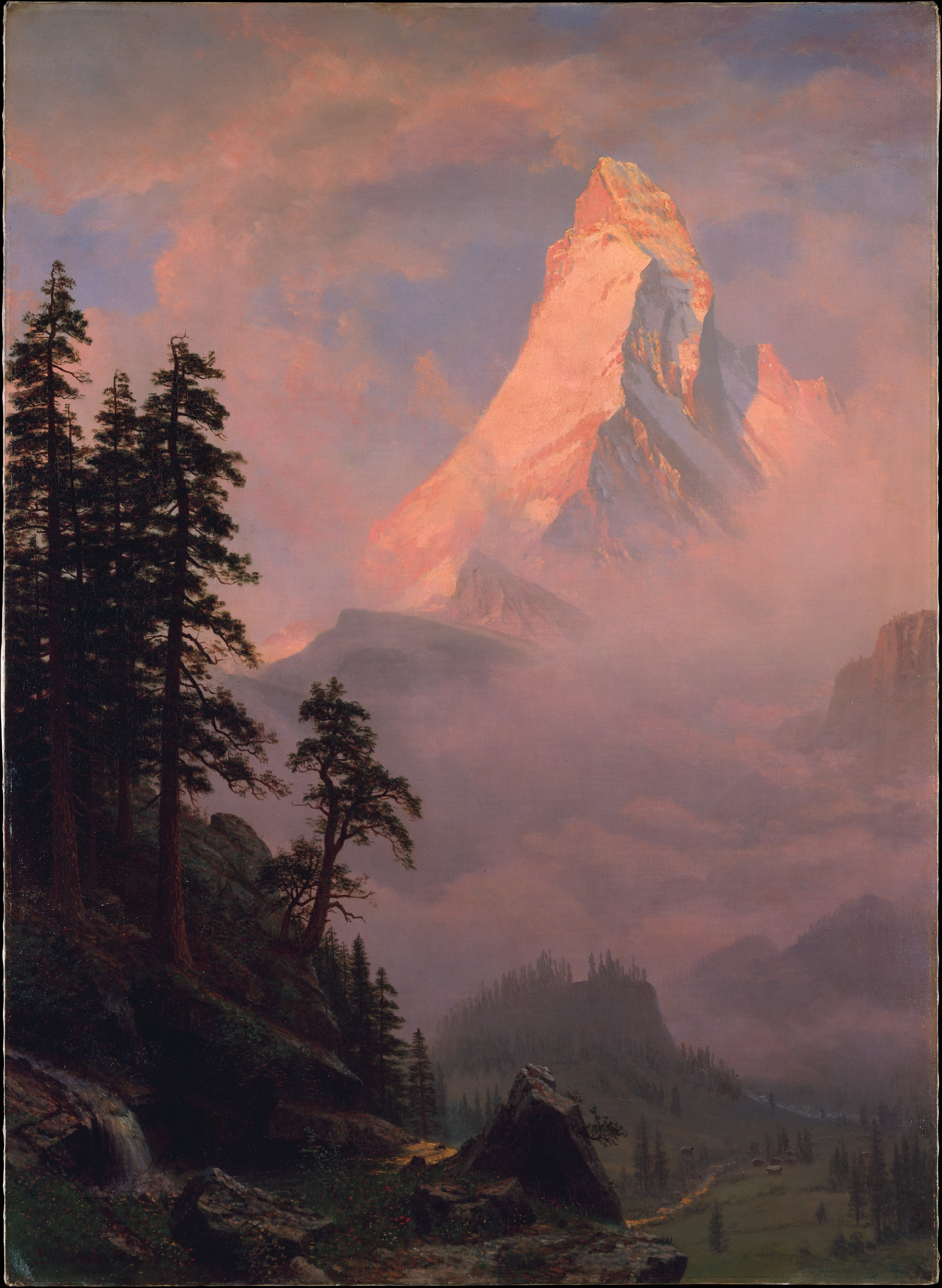
Sunrise on the Matterhorn, after 1875, Metropolitan Museum of Art, New York City

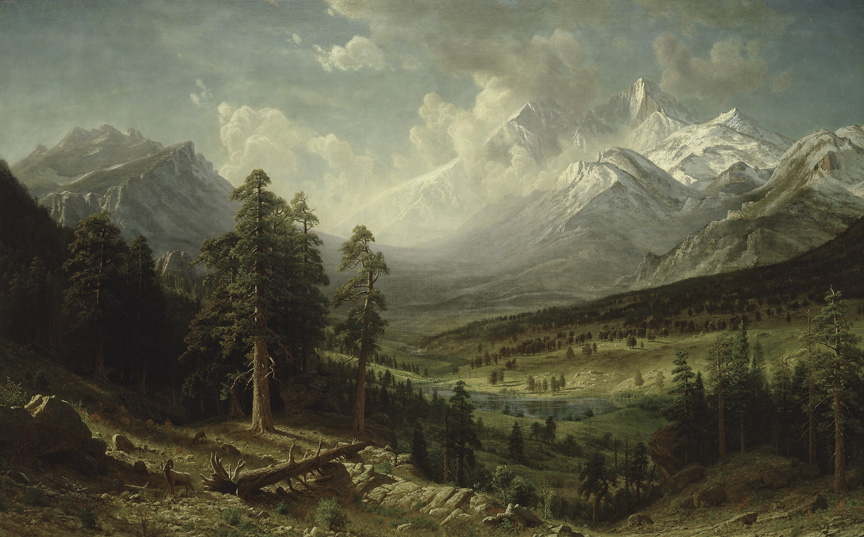
Estes Park, Long's Peak, c 1876-1877, Denver Art Museum, Colorado (on loan from the Denver Public Library)

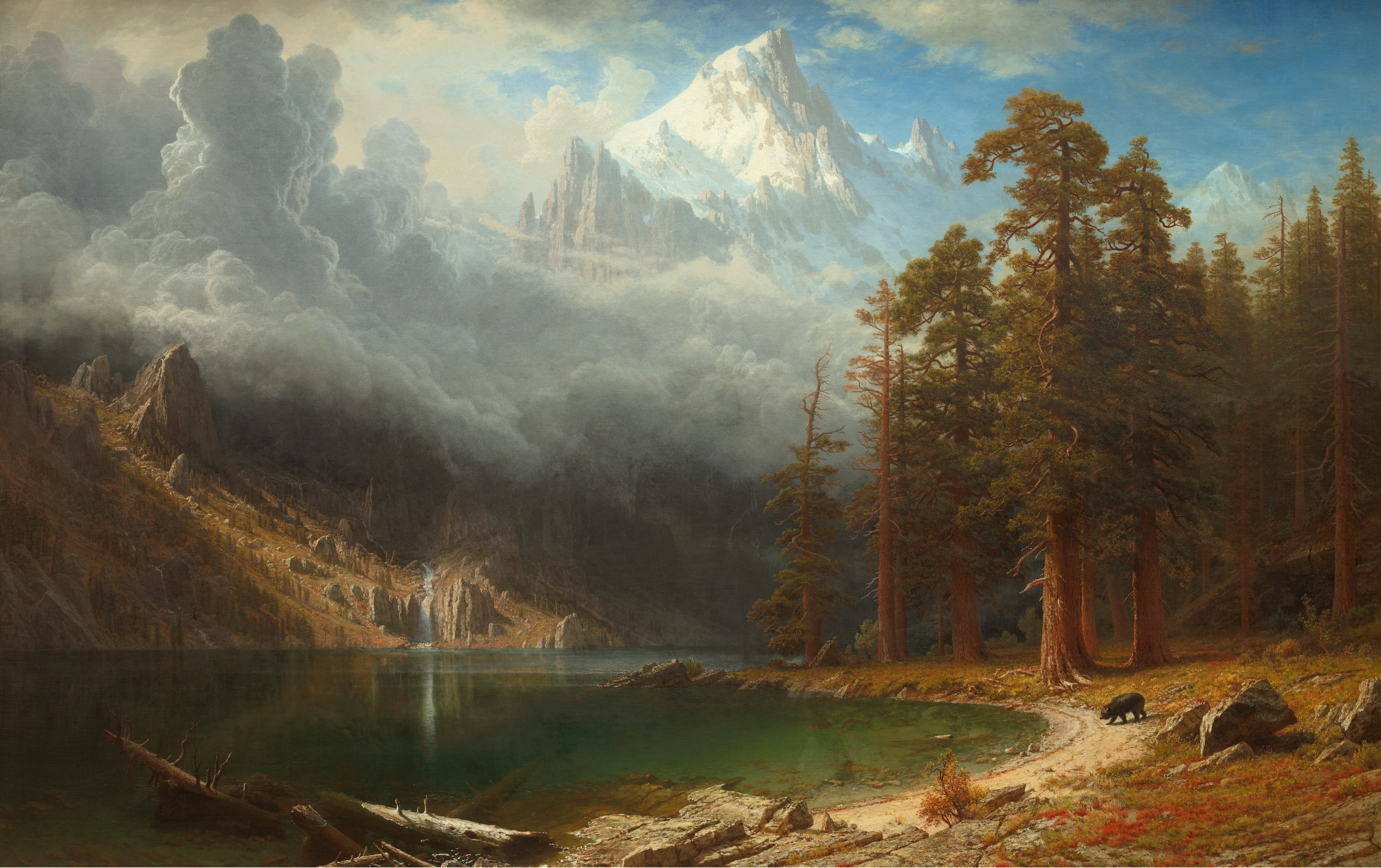
Mount Corcoran, c. 1876–1877, Corcoran Gallery of Art, Washington, D.C.

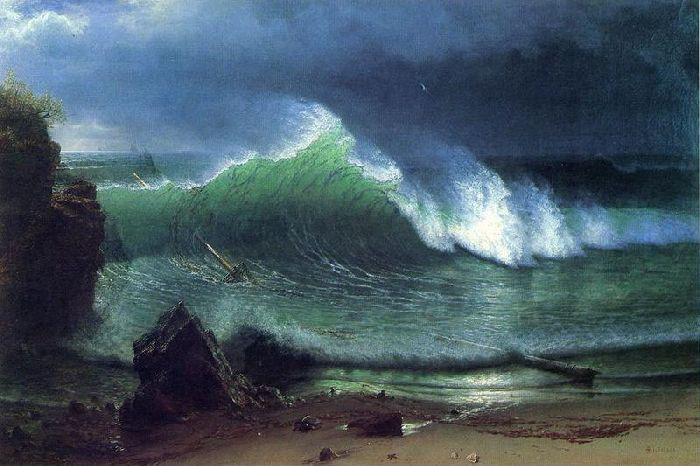
Emerald Sea (or The Shore of the Turquoise Sea), 1878, Manoogian Collection, Detroit, Michigan

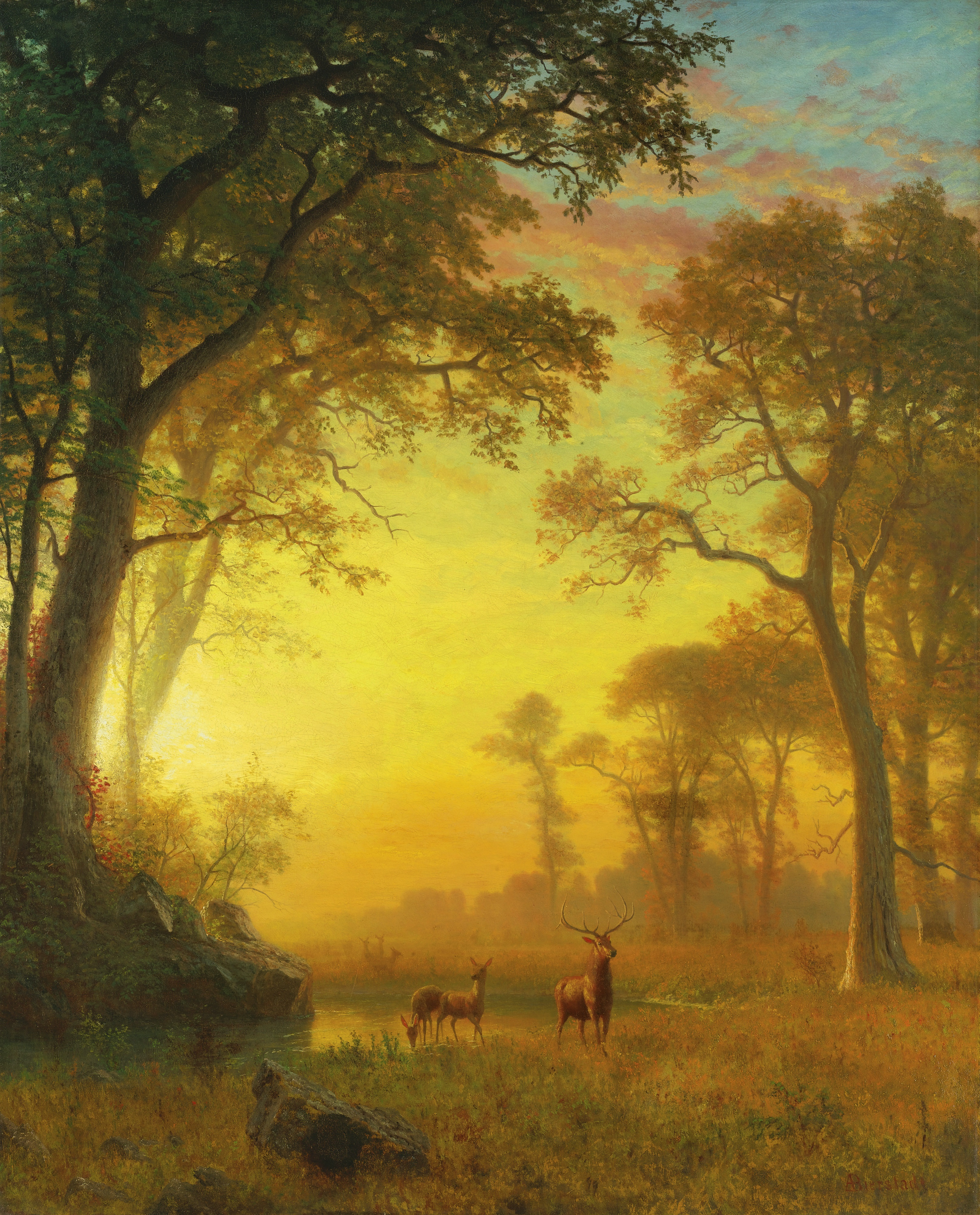
Light in the Forest, unknown date

== Legacy and honors ==
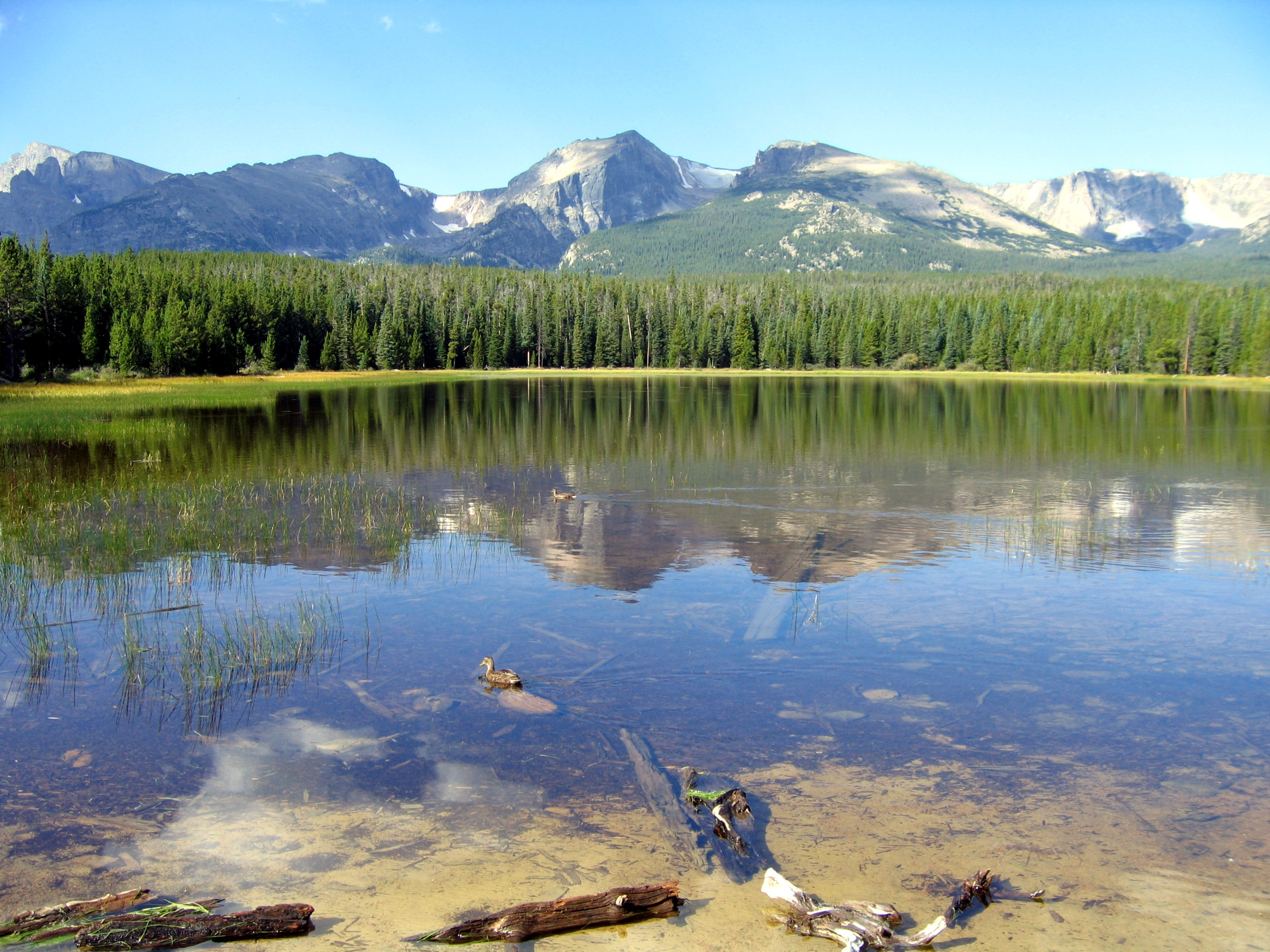
Bierstadt Lake, Rocky Mountain National Park

- Because of Bierstadt's interest in mountain landscapes, Mount Bierstadt and Bierstadt Lake in Colorado are named in his honor. Bierstadt was probably the first European to visit the summit of Mount Blue Sky in 1863, 1.5 miles from Mount Bierstadt. Bierstadt named it Mount Rosa, a reference to both Monte Rosa above Zermatt and, Rosalie Ludlow, his future wife, but the name was changed from Rosalie to Evans in 1895 in honor of Colorado governor John Evans, and again in 2023 to Blue Sky.
- In 1998, the United States Postal Service issued a set of 20 commemorative stamps entitled "Four Centuries of American Art", one of which featured Albert Bierstadt's The Last of the Buffalo. In 2008, the USPS issued a commemorative stamp in its "American Treasures" series featuring Bierstadt's 1864 painting Valley of the Yosemite.
- William Bliss Baker, another landscape artist, studied under Bierstadt.
- The 2018 Pulitzer Prize-winning novel The Overstory by Richard Powers credits Bierstadt for the cover art painting with design by Evan Gaffney. Art Resource has catalogged the same painting as "Cathedral Forest" by Bierstadt. The book won an AIGA 50 Covers award.
