= The Last of the Buffalo =

Painting by Albert Bierstadt

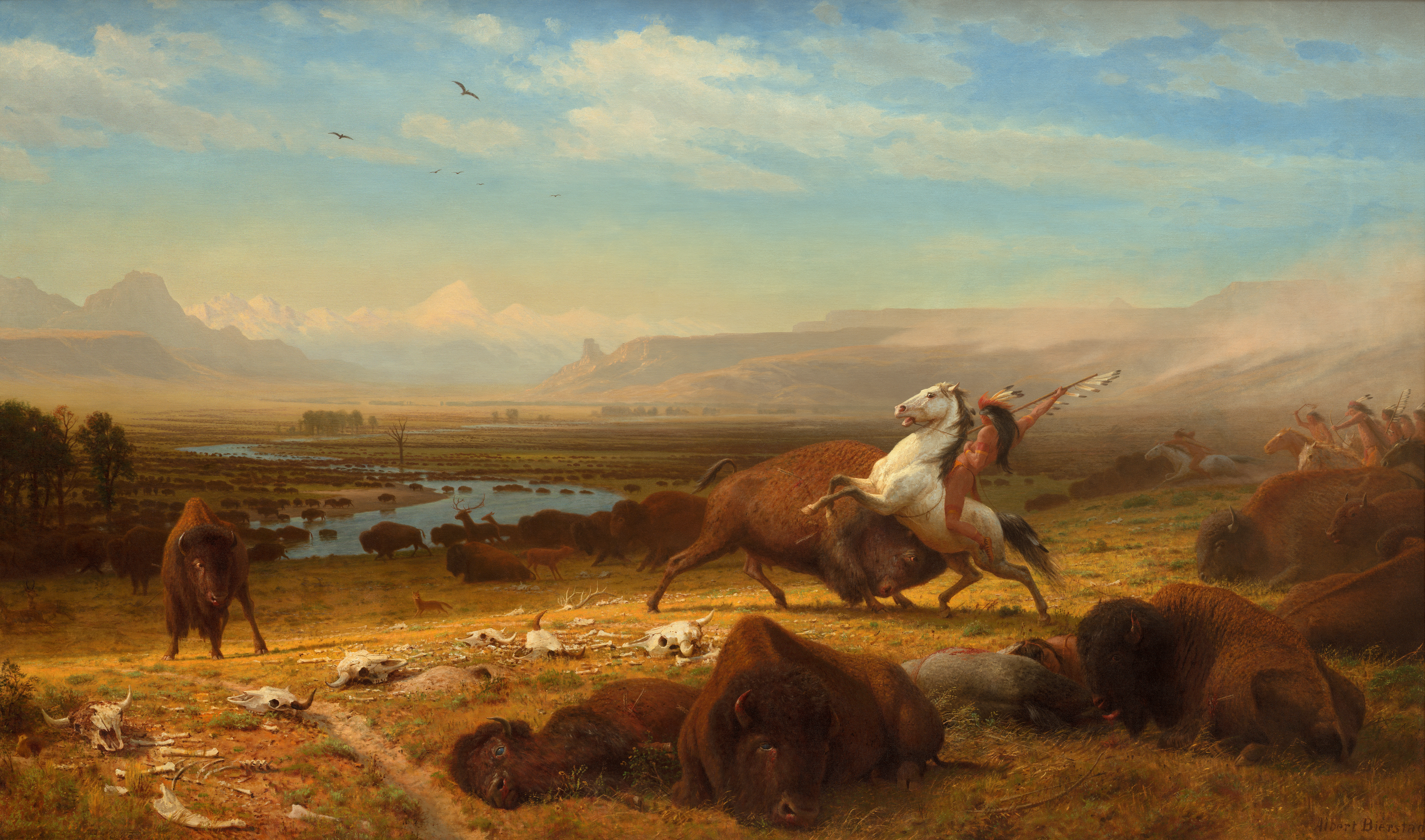
- Artist: Albert Bierstadt
- Year: 1888
- Medium: Oil on canvas
- Movement: Hudson River School
- Dimensions: 180.3 cm × 301.63 cm (71.0 in × 118.75 in)
- Location: National Gallery of Art, Washington, D.C.
- Accession: 2014.79.5

The Last of the Buffalo is an oil on canvas work by Albert Bierstadt, made in 1888. It depicts a buffalo hunt by Native Americans on horseback, in front of a vast plain and snow-covered peaks in the distance. The work is housed at the National Gallery of Art in Washington, D.C.

This canvas can be considered a melancholy reflection on the westward expansion of the United States. Herds of buffalo had diminished drastically due to hunting, nearly to extinction.

The Last of the Buffalo is Albert Bierstadt's last large canvas. This painting combines a variety of elements that the artist had sketched during his expeditions to the west.

In 1998, the United States Postal Service issued a set of 20 commemorative stamps entitled "Four Centuries of American Art", one of which featured Albert Bierstadt's The Last of the Buffalo.

== See also ==
- List of works by Albert Bierstadt
