= Looking Down Yosemite Valley, California =

1865 oil painting by Albert Bierstadt

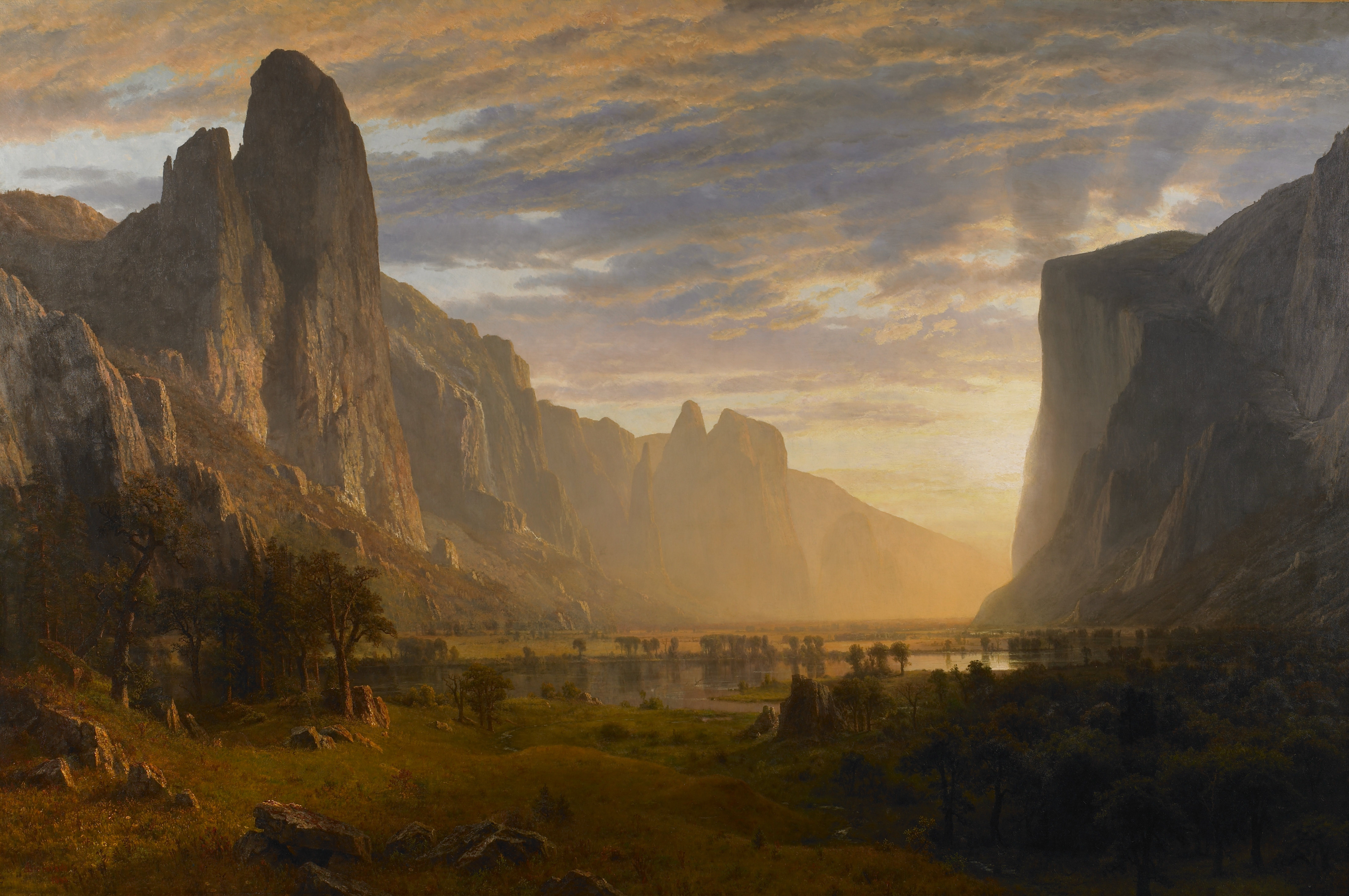
- Artist: Albert Bierstadt
- Year: 1865
- Medium: Oil on canvas
- Dimensions: 163.83 cm × 245.11 cm (64.50 in × 96.50 in)
- Location: Birmingham Museum of Art

Looking Down the Yosemite Valley, California is an 1865 painting by the German-American painter Albert Bierstadt (1830–1902).

It was Bierstadt's first large-scale Yosemite picture, a subject for which he would become well known. It presents a view of one of America's most scenic spots. Based on sketches made during a visit in 1863, Bierstadt paints the valley from a vantage point just above the Merced River, looking due west with the prospect framed by El Capitan on the right, and Sentinel Rock on the left; the spire of Middle Cathedral Rock is visible in the distance.

== See also ==
- List of works by Albert Bierstadt
