= Cho-looke, the Yosemite Fall =

1864 oil painting by Albert Bierstadt

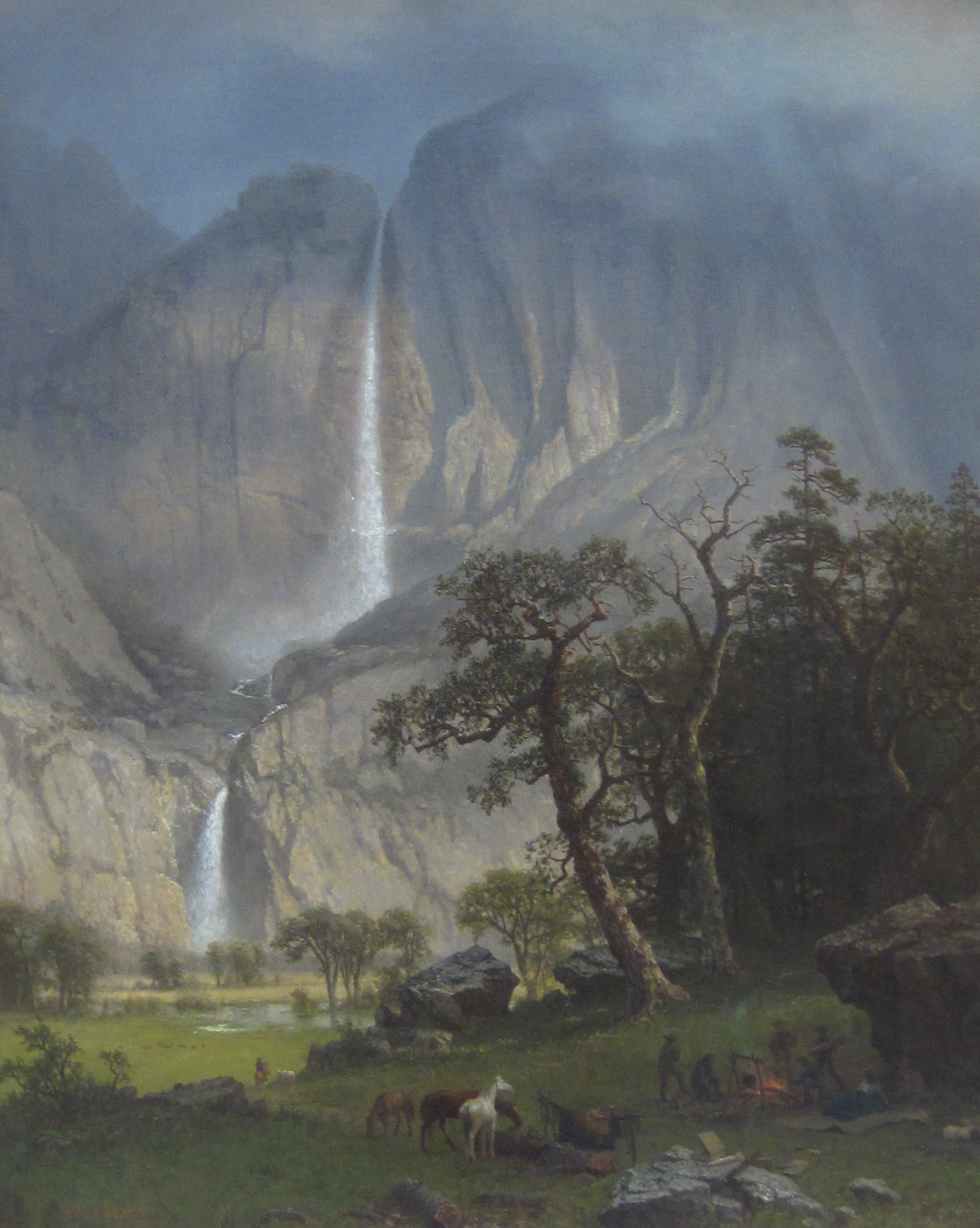
- Artist: Albert Bierstadt
- Year: 1864
- Location: Timken Museum of Art, San Diego, California, U.S.

Cho-looke, the Yosemite Fall is an 1864 oil painting on canvas by the German American painter Albert Bierstadt.

== See also ==
- List of works by Albert Bierstadt
