= Indians in Council, California =

1872 oil painting by Albert Bierstadt

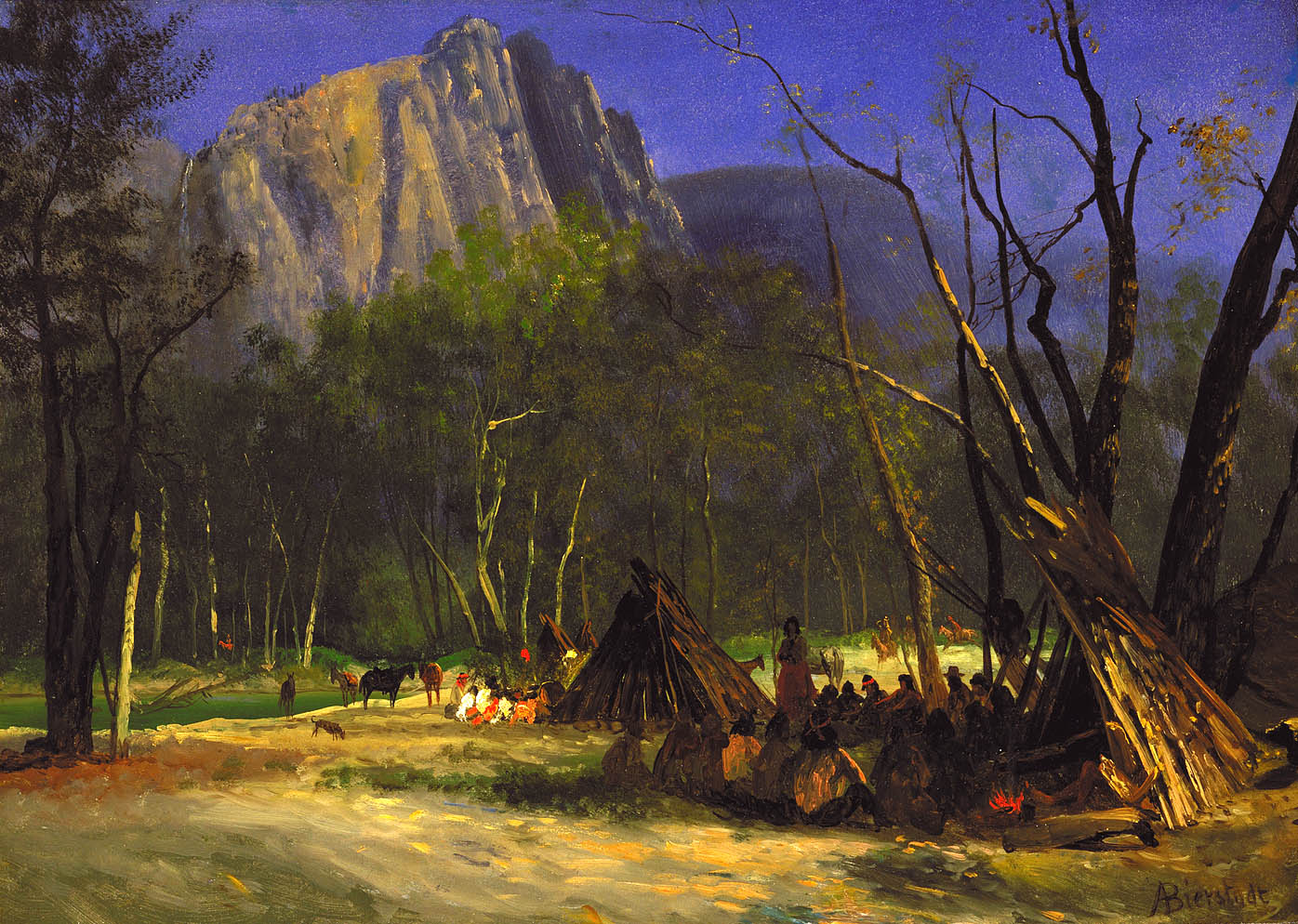
- Artist: Albert Bierstadt
- Year: 1872
- Medium: Oil on paper on canvas
- Movement: Hudson River School
- Subject: Native Americans
- Dimensions: 15 7/8 x 21 7/8 in. (40.4 x 55.5 cm.)
- Location: Smithsonian American Art Museum, Washington, D.C.

Indians in Council, California is an 1872 oil landscape painting by the Hudson River School artist Albert Bierstadt. The painting was made amidst Bierstadt's Yosemite and Sierra Nevada work, while he was residing in California. He felt that Native American life was "rapidly passing away" and it was an artist's duty to "tell ... their history".

== See also ==
- List of works by Albert Bierstadt
