= Puget Sound on the Pacific Coast =

1870 painting by Albert Bierstadt

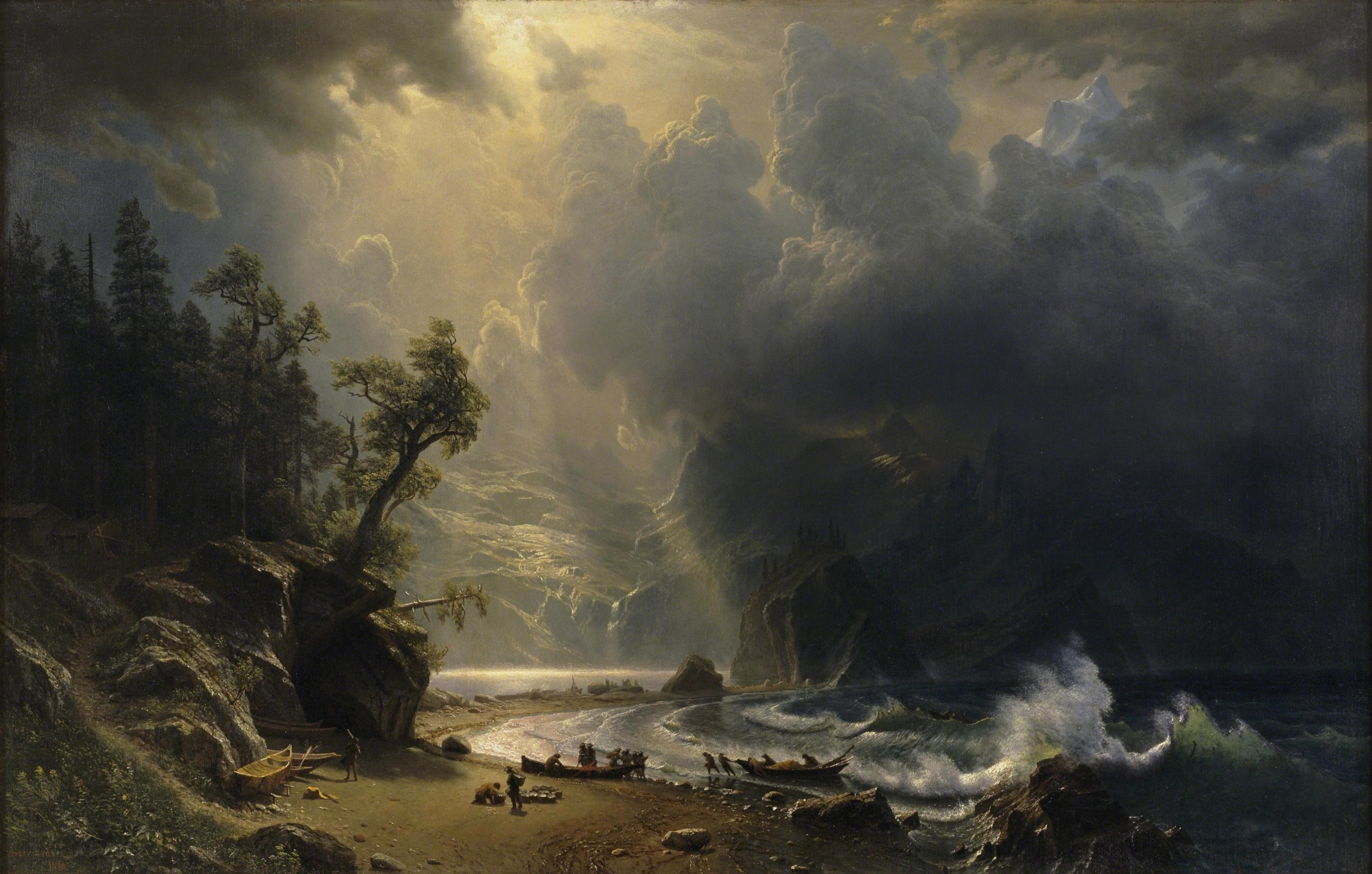
- Artist: Albert Bierstadt
- Year: 1870
- Medium: oil on canvas
- Movement: Hudson River School
- Subject: Puget Sound
- Dimensions: 52 1/2 x 82 in. (133.4 x 208.3 cm)
- Location: Seattle Art Museum, Seattle
- Owner: Seattle Art Museum

Puget Sound on the Pacific Coast is an 1870 oil landscape painting by the Hudson River School artist Albert Bierstadt. At the time of the work's completion, Bierstadt had not yet traveled to what was then Washington Territory. The work, commissioned by China trade merchant Abiel Abbot Low, was painted solely by written description of the Sound.

== See also ==
- List of works by Albert Bierstadt
