= The Falls of St. Anthony =

1880 oil painting by Albert Bierstadt

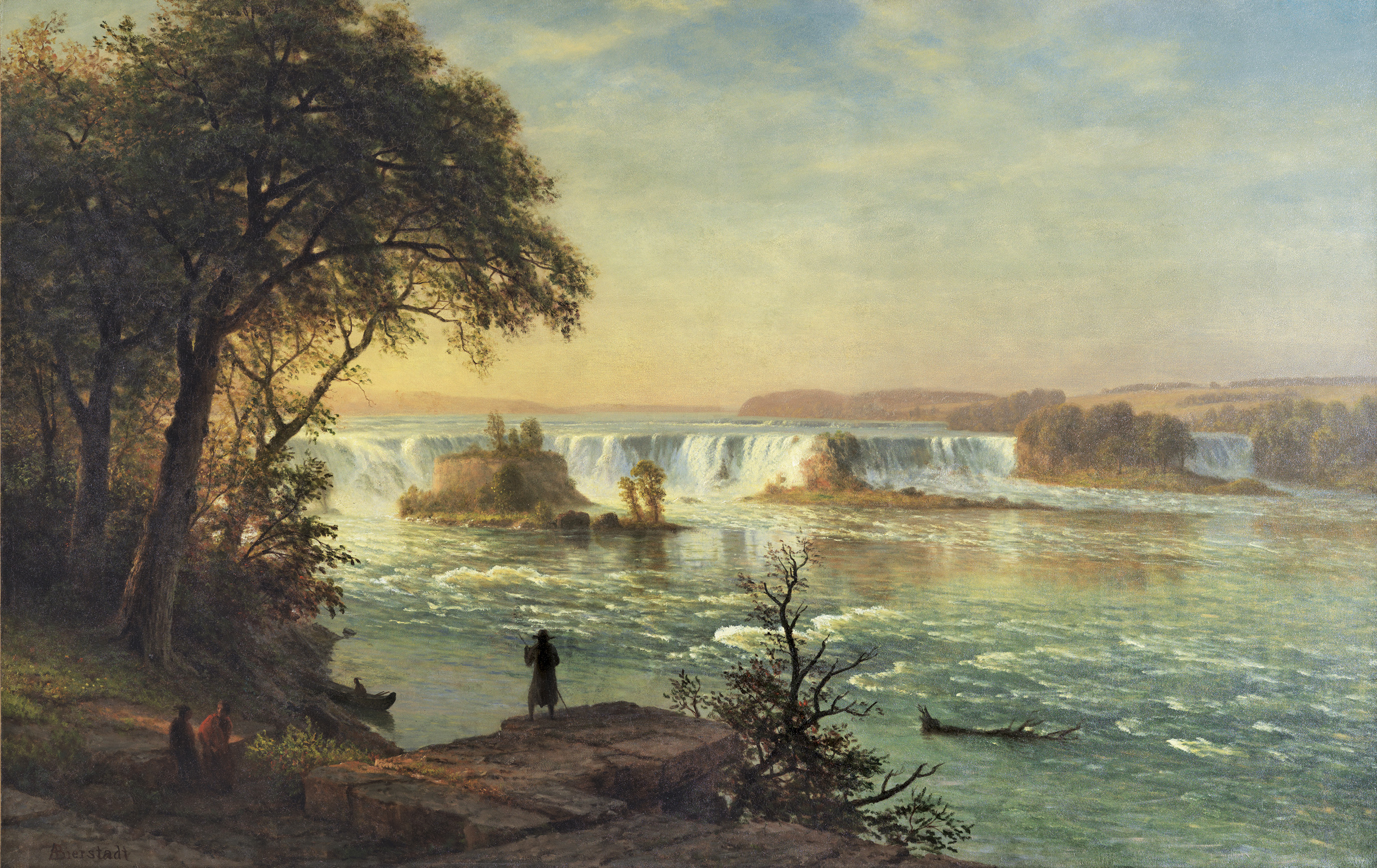
- Artist: Albert Bierstadt
- Year: 1880
- Medium: Oil on canvas
- Movement: Hudson River School
- Subject: Saint Anthony Falls
- Dimensions: 96.8 cm × 153.7 cm (38.1 in × 60.5 in)
- Location: Thyssen-Bornemisza Museum, Madrid
- Owner: Carmen Cervera

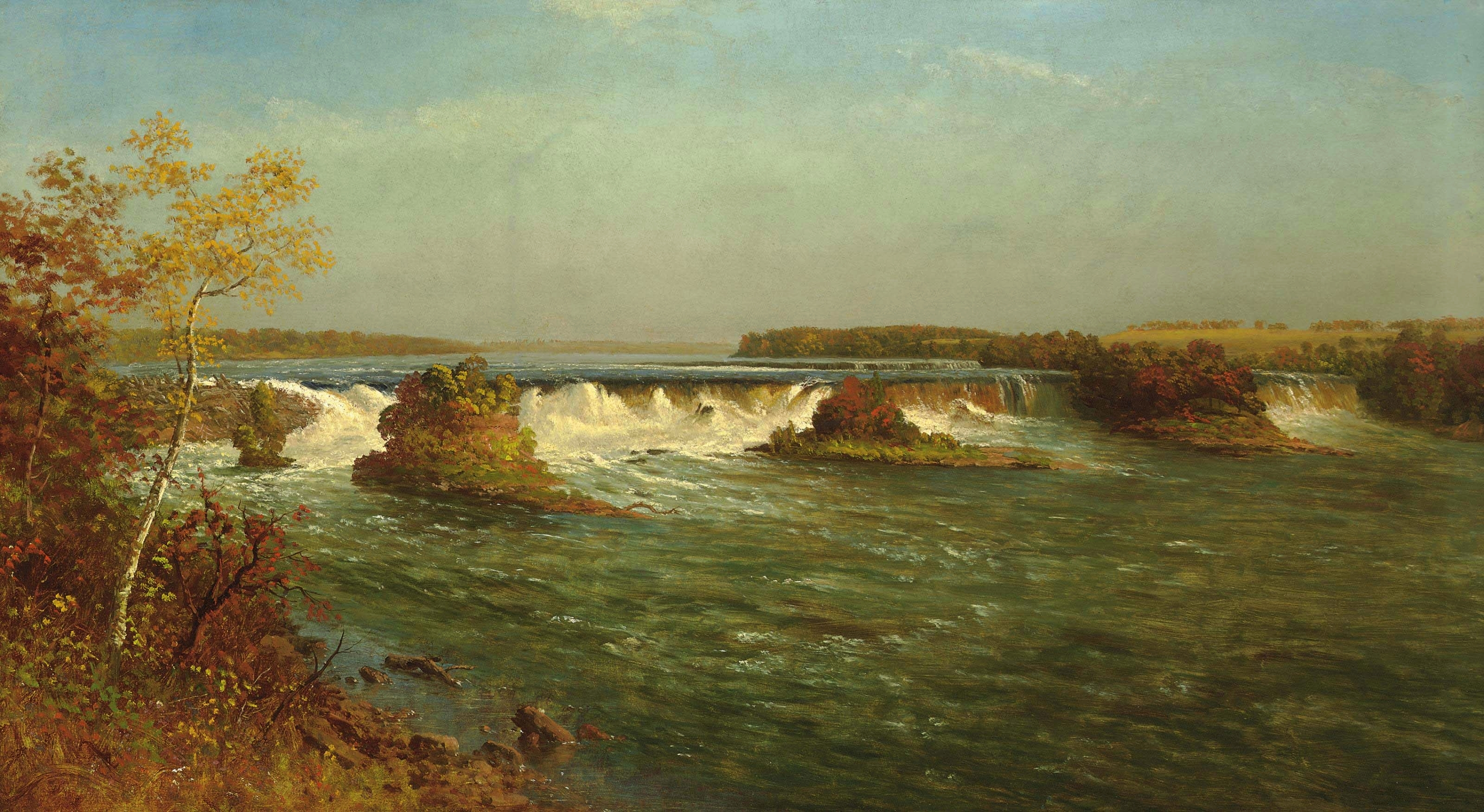
The Falls of Saint Anthony, a second painting of Saint Anthony Falls by Bierstadt, 1887

The Falls of St. Anthony is an 1880 oil landscape painting by the Hudson River School artist Albert Bierstadt.

Saint Anthony Falls, located on the Mississippi River next to what is now downtown Minneapolis, Minnesota, was the only major waterfall on the Mississippi River until its replacement by locks and dams in the early 20th century. Rather than depict the falls with the spillway, Bierstadt depicted them as they appeared prior to human interference. The painting depicts in its foreground several Native Americans, and a hatted figure with a walking stick, speculated to be Louis Hennepin, discoverer of the falls.

Along with Yosemite Valley, Saint Anthony Falls held a particular attraction for painters of 19th-century landscapes, including Bierstadt. The falls were a popular tourist attraction at the time and were depicted in many paintings, including works by Bierstadt, Henry Lewis, and George Catlin.

Bierstadt's painting is based on Henry Lewis' earlier 1847 work The Falls of Saint Anthony, Upper Mississippi, and has been called "a romantic vision of a by-then-long-destroyed falls", which was compromised by the industrialization and growth of the surrounding city of Minneapolis. Like Lewis' work, Bierstadt's painting is an image of the falls before the construction of a dam in 1848 caused a disastrous collapse of the waterfall's main ledge in 1869. Bierstadt may have exaggerated the scale of the falls in his version for dramatic effect, making them seem as large as Niagara Falls. He may have done this to add spiritual and philosophical dimension to the painting. By contrast, Catlin's earlier depiction is more accurate.

The painting has been praised as one of Bierstadt's finest. Art historian Victor Koshkin-Youritzin said that the painting "contains many of the themes spiritually significant to 19th-century audiences—for example, suggestions of the far off, the arduous journey, and the magnificent natural splendors of the virgin wilderness." Historian Paul Schneider said that the painting "shows the 600-yard-wide cascade as a panoramic shift in the crust of the earth, bathed in the painter's romantic evening light."

== See also ==
- List of works by Albert Bierstadt
