= Alaskan Coast Range (painting) =

1889 oil painting by Albert Bierstadt

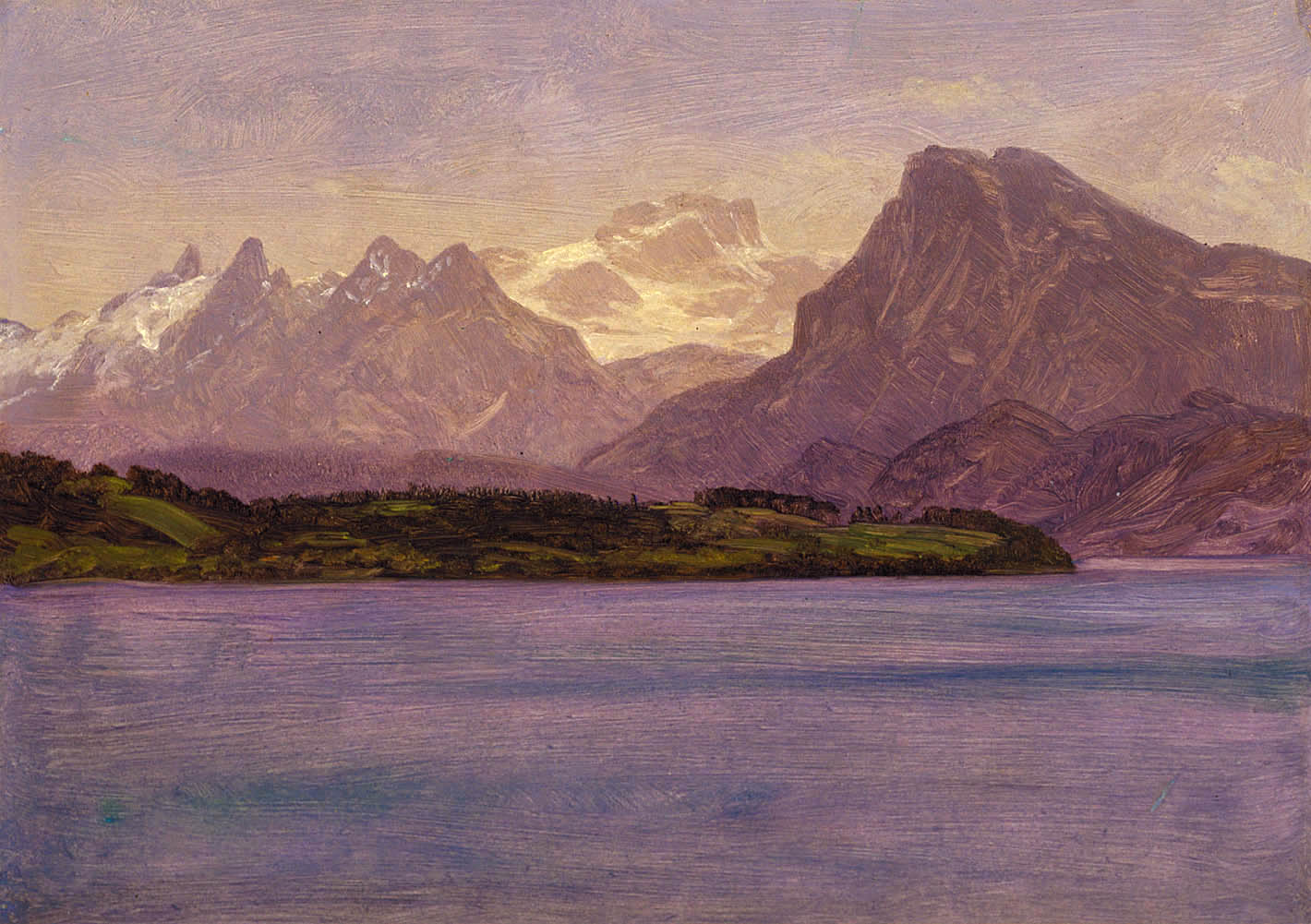
- Artist: Albert Bierstadt
- Year: 1889
- Medium: Oil on paper
- Movement: Hudson River School
- Subject: Alaskan coastline
- Dimensions: 35.2 cm × 49.2 cm (13 7/8 in × 19 3/8 in)
- Location: Smithsonian American Art Museum, Washington, D.C.

Alaskan Coast Range is an 1889 landscape painting by the German American painter Albert Bierstadt that presently hangs in the Smithsonian American Art Museum. While traveling through British Columbia, Bierstadt took a steamship to Alaska in search of more rugged landscapes. He ended up shipwrecked in Loring, Alaska. While sheltering in a nearby Native American settlement, he drew his littoral Alaskan surroundings; this work is most likely an oil sketch made for further detailing.

== See also ==
- List of works by Albert Bierstadt
