= California Spring (painting) =

1875 oil painting by Albert Bierstadt

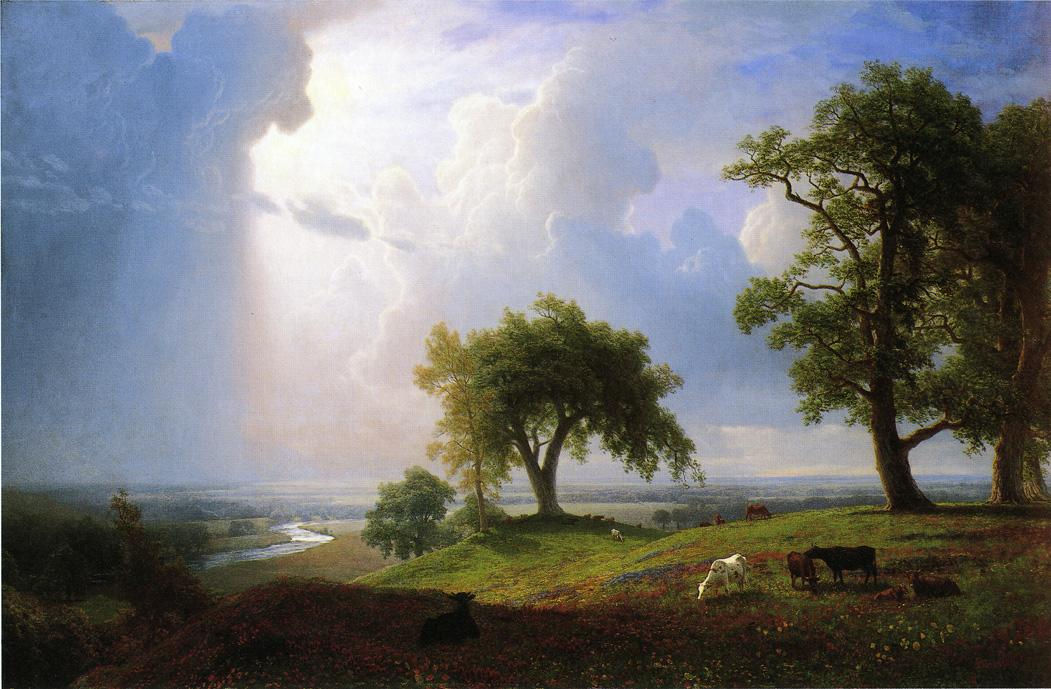
- Artist: Albert Bierstadt
- Year: 1875
- Medium: Oil on canvas
- Movement: Hudson River School
- Subject: California Spring
- Dimensions: 137.8 cm × 214 cm (54 1/4 in × 84 1/4 in)
- Location: de Young Museum, San Francisco
- Owner: City of San Francisco, via Gordon Blanding

California Spring is an 1875 oil landscape painting by the Hudson River School artist Albert Bierstadt. The painting is based on sketches of the Sacramento River Valley, made by Bierstadt when he visited the region in the early 1870s.

== See also ==
- List of works by Albert Bierstadt
