= List of works by Albert Bierstadt =

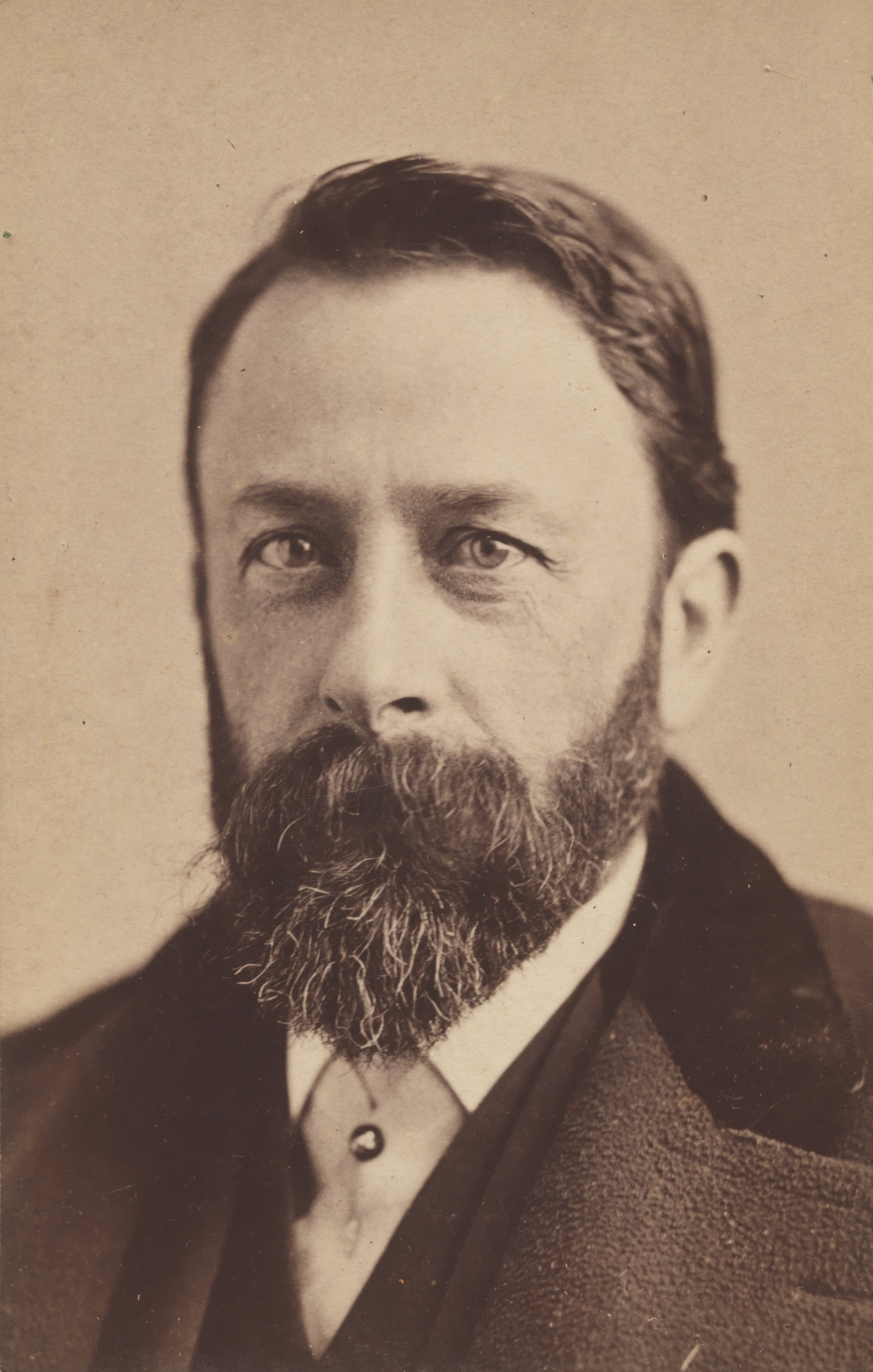
Albert Bierstadt, portrait by Napoleon Sarony

Albert Bierstadt (1830–1902) was a German-born American painter best known for his lavish, sweeping landscapes of the American West. He joined several journeys of the Westward Expansion to paint the scenes.

Bierstadt became part of the second generation of the Hudson River School in New York, an informal group of like-minded painters who started painting along the Hudson River. Their style was based on carefully detailed paintings with romantic, almost glowing lighting, sometimes called luminism. Bierstadt was an important interpreter of the western landscape, and he is also grouped with the Rocky Mountain School.

Many of his works depict natural formations within National Parks, such as Yosemite and Yellowstone.

== Works ==
=== Dated works ===
| Painting | Name | Year | Technique | Dimensions | Current Location |
|---|---|---|---|---|---|
| | Scene in Tyrol | 1854 | Oil on fiberboard | 23.8 cm × 32.4 cm (9.4 in × 12.8 in) | Hirshhorn Museum and Sculpture Garden, Washington, DC 38.888256°N 77.022829°W |
| | Sunshine and Shadow (or Study for Sunshine and Shadow; or Sunshine and Shadow: Study) | 1855 | Oil on paper mounted on canvas | 48.2 cm × 33 cm (19.0 in × 13.0 in) | Newark Museum, Newark, NJ 40.742651°N 74.171779°W IAP 31820356 |
| | The Old Mill (or Scene in Westphalia) | 1855 | Oil on canvas | 118.8 cm × 94.0 cm (46.8 in × 37.0 in) | Private Collection |
| | Study of a Ewe | 1855? | Drawing: black crayon, red/white chalk on laid paper | 26.8 cm × 35.7 cm (10.6 in × 14.1 in) | Brooklyn Museum, Brooklyn, NY40.671306°N 73.96375°W |
| | A Rustic Mill (or A Rustic Mill Farm) | 1855 | Oil on canvas | 375 cm × 279 cm (147.6 in × 109.8 in) | Private collection |
| | European Landscape | 1856? | Oil on paper mounted on canvas | 48.2 cm × 67.3 cm (19.0 in × 26.5 in) | Hirshhorn Museum and Sculpture Garden, Washington, DC |
| | Italian Costume Studies (or Study for Roman Fish Market) | 1856? | Oil on paper | 28.6 cm × 45.7 cm (11.3 in × 18.0 in) | Lyman Allyn Art Museum, New London, CT IAP 07300008 |
| | Olevano | 1856? | Oil on canvas mounted on panel | 48.6 cm × 67.3 cm (19.1 in × 26.5 in) | Saint Louis Art Museum, St Louis, MO38.639444°N 90.294444°W |
| | Fishing Boats at Capri | 1857 | Oil on paper mounted on canvas | 34.3 cm × 49.5 cm (13.5 in × 19.5 in) | Museum of Fine Art, Boston, MA42.339167°N 71.094167°W |
| | Martha Simon, Last of the Narragansetts (Narragansett people) | 1857 | Oil on cardboard | 48.2 cm × 33 cm (19.0 in × 13.0 in) | Millicent Library, Fairhaven, MA41.63568°N 70.90338°W IAP 66610018 |
| | Lake at Franconia Notch, White Mountains | 1857? | Oil on paper or canvas | 34.3 cm × 49.5 cm (13.5 in × 19.5 in) | Newark Museum, Newark, NJ IAP 31820357 IAP 31820035 |
| | Gathering Storm | 1857? | Oil on paper mounted on paperboard | 18.1 cm × 25.4 cm (7.1 in × 10.0 in) | Hirshhorn Museum and Sculpture Garden, Washington, DC IAP 61570007 |
| | Grey Tempest (or White Mountains, New Hampshire) | 1857 | Oil on paper mounted on paperboard | 15.2 cm × 22.2 cm (6.0 in × 8.7 in) | Hirshhorn Museum and Sculpture Garden, Washington, DC IAP 61570006 |
| | On the Beach at Capri | 1857 | Oil on academy board | 25.7 cm × 32.4 cm (10.1 in × 12.8 in) | Wadsworth Atheneum, Hartford, CT |
| | Study in Grey (or New England, White Mountains) | 1857? | Oil on paper mounted on paperboard | 19.7 cm × 25.4 cm (7.8 in × 10.0 in) or 13.7 cm × 20.7 cm (5.4 in × 8.1 in) | Hirshhorn Museum and Sculpture Garden, Washington, DC IAP 61570008 |
| | Gosnold at Cuttyhunk, 1602 | 1858 | Oil on canvas | 71.1 cm × 124.5 cm (28.0 in × 49.0 in) | New Bedford Whaling Museum, New Bedford, MA41.6353°N 70.92318°W |
| | Portico of Octavia, Rome (or Roman Fish Market, Arch of Octavius; or Arch of Octavius (The Roman Fish Market); or Arch of Octavia, Rome) | 1858 | oil on canvas | 70.2 cm × 94.9 cm (27.6 in × 37.4 in) | M. H. de Young Memorial Museum, San Francisco, CA IAP 7106A159 |
| | Bison | 1858 | Oil on cardstock mounted on canvas | 35.6 cm × 48.2 cm (14.0 in × 19.0 in) | Newark MuseumIAP 31820358 |
| | Grove of Trees | 1858? | Oil on paper on cardboard | 34.3 cm × 48.2 cm (13.5 in × 19.0 in) | Museum of Fine Art, Boston, MA |
| | Indian Camp | 1858? | Oil on canvas | 33.6 cm × 34.1 cm (13.2 in × 13.4 in) | Museum of Fine Art, Boston, MA IAP 20490120 |
| | Study of a Brown Horse | 1858? | Oil on panel | 36.8 cm × 50.2 cm (14.5 in × 19.8 in) | Museum of Fine Art, Boston, MA IAP 20490118 |
| | The Black Horse | 1859? | Oil on paper mounted on paperboard | 34.3 cm × 4.8 cm (13.5 in × 1.9 in) | Museum of Fine Arts, Boston IAP 20490116 |
| | Beached Ship | 1859 | Oil on canvas | 43.2 cm × 54 cm (17.0 in × 21.3 in) | Sold at Auction, 28 November 2007 |
| | View Near Newport | 1859 | Oil on milkboard | 30.5 cm × 45.7 cm (12 in × 18 in) | Currier Museum of Art, Manchester, NH IAP 80330005 |
| color image | Swiss Mountain Scene (or Rocky Mountain Scene) | 1859 | Oil on canvas | 60 cm × 85 cm (23.6 in × 33.5 in) | Herbert F. Johnson Museum of Art, Cornell UniversityIAP 35010066 |
| view | The Trout Brook | 1859 | Oil on academy board | 23.2 cm × 29.8 cm (9.1 in × 11.7 in) | Fogg Museum, Harvard University, Cambridge, MA IAP 20780420 |
| | Approaching Storm | 1859 | Oil | 16.5 in × 20.5 in (41.9 cm × 52.1 cm) | Arnot Art Museum, Elmira, NY |
| | Covered Wagons | 1859? | Oil on illustration board | 35.5 cm × 27.9 cm (14.0 in × 11.0 in) | Bancroft Library, University of California, Berkeley, CA37.87226°N 122.25885°W |
| | Indians near Fort Laramie | 1859? | Oil on paper on cardboard | 34.3 cm × 49.5 cm (13.5 in × 19.5 in) | Museum of Fine Art, Boston, MA |
| | The Wolf River, Kansas | 1859? | Oil on canvas | 122.5 cm × 97.1 cm (48.2 in × 38.2 in) | Detroit Institute of Arts, Detroit, MI42.359292°N 83.064797°W |
| | Thunderstorm in the Rocky Mountains | 1859 | Oil on canvas | 48.2 cm × 73.7 cm (19.0 in × 29.0 in) | Museum of Fine Art, Boston, MA IAP 20490121 |
| | Nooning on the Platte, N.D. | 1859? | Oil on paper mounted on canvase | 17.2 cm × 32.7 cm (6.8 in × 12.9 in) | Saint Louis Art Museum, St Louis, MO IAP 28110117 |
| | Surveyor's Wagon in the Rockies [incorrect title] | 1859? | Oil on paper mounted on canvas | 19.7 cm × 32.7 cm (7.8 in × 12.9 in) | Saint Louis Art Museum, St Louis, MO |
| | View of Chimney Rock, Ohalilah Sioux Village in the Foreground | 1860 | Oil on millboard | 33.7 cm × 49.4 cm (13.3 in × 19.4 in) | Colby College Museum of Art, Waterville, ME IAP 81240003 |
| | View from the Wind River Mountains, Wyoming | 1860 | Oil on canvas | 76.8 cm × 123.2 cm (30.2 in × 48.5 in) | Museum of Fine Arts, Boston |
| [[]] | Scene Near Olevano | 1860 | Oil on canvas | | Butler-McCook House Museum, Hartford, CT |
| | River Estuary | 1860? | Oil on paper mounted on masonite | 31.2 cm × 47.0 cm (12.3 in × 18.5 in) | IAP 9E260015 |
| | A Wilderness Lake (or Echo Lake, Franconia Mountains, New Hampshire) | 1861 | Oil on canvas | 63.5 cm × 99.4 cm (25.0 in × 39.1 in) | Smith College Museum of Art, Northampton, MA IAP 22280002 |
| | Emigrants Resting at Sunset (possibly same as Emigrants Camping) | 1861? | Oil on canvas | 94 cm × 147.3 cm (37.0 in × 58.0 in) | R. W. Norton Art Gallery, Shreveport, LA 32.458716°N 93.740959°W |
| | Italian Coastal View [Amalfi?] | 1861 | Oil on canvas | 49.5 cm × 60.9 cm (19.5 in × 24.0 in) | Regis College, Weston, MA42.350556°N 71.309167°W IAP 81970003 |
| | Sunset Light, Wind River Range of the Rocky Mountains | 1861 | Oil on canvas | 99.1 cm × 152.4 cm (39.0 in × 60.0 in) | New Bedford Free Public Library, New Bedford, MA |
| | The Brothers' Burial (or The Brother's Burial) | 1861 | Oil on canvas | 45.7 cm × 82.6 cm (18.0 in × 32.5 in) | George Walter Vincent Smith Art Museum, Springfield Museums, Springfield, MA |
| | The Trappers' Camp | 1861 | Oil on millboard | 33 cm × 48.3 cm (13.0 in × 19.0 in) | Yale University Art Gallery |
| | Wasatch Mountains, Wind River Country, Wyoming | 1861 | Oil on canvas | 67.3 cm × 102.9 cm (26.5 in × 40.5 in) | Denver Art Museum, Denver, CO39.737222°N 104.989722°W |
| | Yosemite Valley, Glacier Point Trail | 1862? | Oil on canvas | 137.2 cm × 215.3 cm (54.0 in × 84.8 in) | Yale University Art Gallery, New Haven, CT |
| | Guerilla Warfare, Civil War | 1862 | Oil on panel | 39.4 cm × 47.2 cm (15.5 in × 18.6 in) | Century Association, New York, NY40.754444°N 73.981111°W |
| | View of Moat Mountain, Intervale, New Hampshire | 1862? | Oil on paper mounted on canvas | 48.3 cm × 65.7 cm (19.0 in × 25.9 in) | Currier Museum of Art, Manchester, NH42.997778°N 71.455833°W IAP 30810019 |
| | Ascutney Mountain from Claremont, New Hampshire | 1862 | Oil on canvas | 102.9 cm × 180.4 cm (40.5 in × 71.0 in) | Fruitlands Museum, Harvard, MA42.493611°N 71.613056°W |
| | Morning in the Rocky Mountains | 1862 | Oil on paper mounted on canvas | 21.6 cm × 29.2 cm (8.5 in × 11.5 in) | R. W. Norton Art Gallery, Shreveport, LA |
| | Indians Spear Fishing | 1862 | Oil on canvas | 48.9 cm × 74.3 cm (19.3 in × 29.3 in) | Museum of Fine Arts, Houston, TX 29.725694°N 95.390417°W IAP 51430105 |
| | Sunlight and Shadow | 1862 | Oil on canvas | 105.4 cm × 90.2 cm (41.5 in × 35.5 in) or 99.1 cm × 82.6 cm (39.0 in × 32.5 in) | M. H. de Young Memorial Museum, San Francisco, CA37.771389°N 122.468611°W IAP 83410039 |
| | Washington, D.C. | 1863 | Oil on canvas | 43.39 cm × 29.26 cm (17.1 in × 11.5 in) | The White House, Washington D.C., |
| | The Rocky Mountains, Lander's Peak | 1863 | Oil on canvas | 186.7 cm × 306.7 cm (73.5 in × 120.7 in) | Metropolitan Museum of Art, New York, NY40.77891°N 73.96367°W |
| | Campfire | 1863 | Oil on canvas | 43.2 cm × 62.2 cm (17.0 in × 24.5 in) | Mead Art Museum, Amherst College, Amherst, MA42.3709°N 72.5155°W IAP 20090516 |
| | Mountain Brook | 1863 | Oil on canvas | 111.8 cm × 91.4 cm (44 in × 36 in) | IAP 73262264 IAP 12000418 |
| | On the Platte River, Nebraska | 1863 | Oil on canvas/paper | 91.4 cm × 146 cm (36.0 in × 57.5 in) | Gilcrease Museum, Tulsa, Oklahoma |
| | Rocky Mountains, Lander's Peak | 1863 | Oil on linen | 110.8 cm × 90.2 cm (43.6 in × 35.5 in) | Fogg Museum, Harvard University, Cambridge, MA IAP 20780302 |
| color image | White Horse and Sunset | 1863? | Oil on board | 29.2 cm × 39.4 cm (11.5 in × 15.5 in) | Whitney Gallery of Western Art, Buffalo Bill Historical Center, Cody, WY |
| color image | Cloud Effect, Estes Park, Colorado | 1863? | Oil paper mounted on canvas | 40 cm × 52.7 cm (15.7 in × 20.7 in) | Haggin Museum, Stockton, CA IAP 82980071 |
| color image | Looking up the Yosemite Valley | 1863? | Oil on canvas | 91.1 cm × 147.3 cm (35.9 in × 58.0 in) | Haggin Museum, Stockton, CA IAP 04950003 |
| | Yosemite Valley (or Lake in the Yosemite Valley) | c.1863 | Oil on canvas | 92.8 cm × 132.7 cm (36.5 in × 52.2 in) | Haggin Museum, Stockton, CA IAP 82980079 IAP 82980077 |
| view | In the Rockies, Former Title: Indians on Horseback | 1863? | Oil on paper | 33 cm × 48.3 cm (13.0 in × 19.0 in) | Fogg Museum, Harvard University, Cambridge, MA IAP 83950002 |
| | Sundown at Yosemite | 1863? | Oil on canvas | 30.5 cm × 40.6 cm (12.0 in × 16.0 in) | Museo Thyssen-Bornemisza, Madrid, Spain 40.416111°N 3.695°W |
| | Great Salt Lake, Utah | 1863? | Oil on paper mounted on cardboard | 35.6 cm × 49.5 cm (14.0 in × 19.5 in) | Frye Art Museum, Seattle, WA IAP 56440009 |
| | Lake Tahoe, California | 1863? | Oil on canvas | 35.5 cm × 48.3 cm (14.0 in × 19.0 in) | Bancroft Library |
| | On the Merced River | 1863? | Oil on canvas | 92.7 cm × 133.4 cm (36.5 in × 52.5 in) | California Historical Society, San Francisco, CA37.786844°N 122.401481°W IAP 71065025 |
| | The Oregon Trail Campfire | 1863 | Oil on canvas mounted on board | 75.6 cm × 111.8 cm (29.8 in × 44.0 in) | Private collection |
| | Mountain Lake (Study for Storm in the Rocky Mountains—Mount Rosalie) | 1863 | Oil on paper mounted on panel | 75.6 cm × 111.8 cm (29.8 in × 44.0 in) | Denver Art Museum, Denver, CO 39.737222°N 104.989722°W |
| | Mirror Lake, Yosemite Valley | 1864 | Oil on canvas | 55.9 cm × 76.5 cm (22.0 in × 30.1 in) | Santa Barbara Museum of Art, Santa Barbara, CA34.422789°N 119.70345°W IAP 04710023 |
| | Mountain and River Scene | 1864 | Oil on canvas | 35.6 cm × 50.8 cm (14.0 in × 20.0 in) | Gilcrease Museum, Tulsa, OK IAP 82980145 |
| | Study of a Tree | 1864? | Oil on paper mounted on board | 23.5 cm × 20 cm (9.3 in × 7.9 in) | Metropolitan Museum of Art, New York, NY IAP 36121196 |
| color image | Valley of the Yosemite | 1864? | Oil on canvas | 35.6 cm × 48.3 cm (14.0 in × 19.0 in) | Joslyn Art Museum, Omaha, NE IAP 29990028 |
| | Night at Valley View (formerly Moonlight on the Merced) | 1864 | Oil on canvas | 86.4 cm × 69 cm (34.0 in × 27.2 in) | Yosemite National Park Museum, Yosemite National Park, CA37.7486°N 119.588°W |
| | Cho-looke, the Yosemite Fall (or Camping in the Yosemite; or Yosemite Scene of Bridal Veil Falls) | 1864 | Oil on canvas | 87 cm × 68.9 cm (34.3 in × 27.1 in) | Timken Museum of Art, San Diego, CA 32.7318°N 117.1496°W IAP 82980064 |
| | Valley of the Yosemite | 1864 | Oil on prepared millboard | 29.8 cm × 48.9 cm (11.7 in × 19.3 in) | Museum of Fine Art, Boston, MA IAP 20490124 |
| | Looking Down Yosemite Valley, California | 1865 | Oil on canvas | 162.6 cm × 244.5 cm (64.0 in × 96.3 in) | Birmingham Museum of Art, Birmingham, AL33.52195°N 86.81018°W |
| color image | The Sierras near Lake Tahoe, California, California No. 45 | 1865 | Oil on panel | 38 cm × 53.5 cm (15.0 in × 21.1 in); IAP 8A270016 | Memorial Art Gallery, University of Rochester, Rochester, NY IAP 8A270016 |
| | The Burning Ship | 1865 | Oil on paper on paperboard | 11 7/8 × 15 7/8 inches | Hudson River Museum, Yonkers, NY |
| | In the Yosemite Valley | 1866 | Oil on canvas | 88.9 cm × 127 cm (35.0 in × 50.0 in) | Wadsworth Atheneum, Hartford, CT |
| | A Storm in the Rocky Mountains, Mt. Rosalie | 1866 | Oil on canvas | 210.8 cm × 361.3 cm (83.0 in × 142.2 in) | Brooklyn Museum, Brooklyn, NY IAP 87440029 |
| | Merced River, Yosemite Valley | 1866 | Oil on canvas | | The Metropolitan Museum of Art |
| [[]] | In The Mountains | 1867 | Oil on canvas | | Wadsworth Atheneum, Hartford, CT |
| color image | The Domes of the Yosemite | 1867 | Oil on canvas | 294.6 cm × 457.2 cm (116.0 in × 180.0 in) | St. Johnsbury Athenaeum, St. Johnsbury, VT IAP 53970014 |
| color image | Lake Tahoe, California | 1867 | Oil on canvas | 55.9 cm × 76.2 cm (22.0 in × 30.0 in) | Museum of Fine Art, Boston, MA IAP 20490125 |
| | Snow Scene with Buffalo | 1867? | Oil on prepared millboard | 45.7 cm × 60.9 cm (18.0 in × 24.0 in) | Museum of Fine Art, Boston, MA IAP 20490127 |
| | The Yosemite Valley [incorrect title] | 1867 | Oil on canvas | 89.8 cm × 126 cm (35.4 in × 49.6 in) | Wadsworth Atheneum, Hartford, CT |
| color image | Sunset in the Yosemite Valley (or Sunset in Yosemite Valley; or Sunset in Yosemite) | 1868 | Oil on canvas | 90.2 cm × 130.8 cm (35.5 in × 51.5 in) | Haggin Museum, Stockton, CA37.960284°N 121.313991°W IAP 82980069 |
| | Landscape | 1868 | Oil on canvas | 32.7 cm × 40.7 cm (12.9 in × 16.0 in) | Fogg Museum, Harvard University, Cambridge, MA |
| | Yosemite Valley | 1868 | Oil on canvas | 91.4 cm × 137.2 cm (36.0 in × 54.0 in) | Oakland Museum, Oakland, CA IAP 82980057 |
| | Connecticut River Valley, Claremont, New Hampshire | 1868 | Oil on canvas | 68.6 cm × 111.8 cm (27.0 in × 44.0 in) | Berkshire Museum, Pittsfield, MA42.4473°N 73.2536°W IAP 82980114 |
| | In the Sierras, Former Title: Lake Tahoe | 1868 | Oil on canvas | 33 cm × 41 cm (13.0 in × 16.1 in) | Fogg Museum, Harvard University, Cambridge, MA IAP 20780303 |
| | Among the Sierra Nevada Mountains, California (or Among the Sierra Nevada Mountains, California; or Sierra Nevada in California; or Western Landscape with Lake and Mountains) | 1868 | Oil on canvas | 305 cm × 183 cm (120.1 in × 72.0 in) | Smithsonian American Art Museum, Washington, DC IAP 08582014 |
| | Mount Vesuvius at Midnight (or Mt. Aetna; Mount Aetna; Vesuvius) | 1868 | Oil on canvas | 60.7 cm × 42.6 cm (23.9 in × 16.8 in) (smaller version of a larger canvas now lost) | Cleveland Museum of Art, Cleveland, OH IAP 41000051 |
| | Emigrants Crossing the Plains (The Oregon Trail) | 1869 | Oil on canvas | 78.7 cm × 124.5 cm (31.0 in × 49.0 in) | National Cowboy & Western Heritage Museum, Oklahoma City, OK 35.535556°N 97.483056°W |
| b&w image | Niagara from the American Side | 1869? | Oil on paper mounted on canvas | 35.5 cm × 49.5 cm (14.0 in × 19.5 in) | Museum of Fine Art, Boston, MA IAP 20490128 |
| view in collection search | Western Landscape (previously known by incorrect title Mount Whitney) | 1869 | Oil on canvas | 91.4 cm × 137.1 cm (36.0 in × 54.0 in) | Newark Museum, Newark, NJ IAP 82980120 (IAP 82340044) |
| | The Coming Storm | 1869 | Oil on panel | 24.2 cm × 33 cm (9.5 in × 13.0 in) | Addison Gallery of American Art, Phillips Academy, Andover, MA42.648611°N 71.133333°W |
| | The Buffalo Trail: The Impending Storm | 1869 | Oil on canvas | 74.9 cm × 125.7 cm (29.5 in × 49.5 in) | National Gallery of Art, Washington, DC38.89147°N 77.02001°W |
| | Niagara Falls | 1869 | Oil on canvas | 36.2 cm × 48.9 cm (14.3 in × 19.3 in) | M. H. de Young Memorial Museum, San Francisco, CA IAP 83410042 |
| | Falls of Niagara from Below | 1869 | Oil on canvas | 92.1 cm × 66.7 cm (36.3 in × 26.3 in) | |
| color image | Ferns and Rocks on an Embankment | 1869 | Oil on board | 48 cm × 33 cm (18.9 in × 13.0 in) | Herbert F. Johnson Museum of Art, Cornell University, Ithaca, NY |
| | Sierra Nevada Morning | 1870 | Oil on canvas | 142.2 cm × 213.4 cm (56.0 in × 84.0 in) | Crystal Bridges Museum of American Art, Bentonville, AR IAP 43590008 |
| | Passing Storm over the Sierra Nevadas | 1870 | Oil on canvas | 92.7 cm × 139.7 cm (36.5 in × 55.0 in) | San Antonio Museum of Art, San Antonio, TX 29.437568°N 98.482089°W |
| | Storm in the Mountains | 1870 | Oil on canvas | 96.5 cm × 152.4 cm (38.0 in × 60.0 in) | Museum of Fine Arts, Boston IAP 20490130 |
| | Puget Sound on the Pacific Coast | 1870 | Oil on canvas | 133.4 cm × 208.3 cm (52.5 in × 82.0 in) | Seattle Art Museum, Seattle, WA 47.607222°N 122.338056°W IAP 8A270017 |
| | Evening on the Prairie | 1870? | Oil on canvas | 81.3 cm × 123 cm (32.0 in × 48.4 in) | Museo Thyssen-Bornemisza, Madrid, Spain |
| | Rocky Mountain Landscape | 1870 | Oil on canvas | 51.66 cm × 34.64 cm (20.3 in × 13.6 in) | The White House, Washington, D.C. |
| | Sunrise, Yosemite Valley | 1870 | Oil on canvas | 135.6 cm × 92.7 cm (53.4 in × 36.5 in) | Amon Carter Museum of American Art, Fort Worth, Texas |
| | The Emerald Pool | 1870 | Oil on canvas | 194.3 cm × 302.3 cm (76.5 in × 119.0 in) | Chrysler Museum of Art, Norfolk, VA |
| | Mountainous Landscape by Moonlight | 1871 | Oil on canvas | 76.2 cm × 127 cm (30.0 in × 50.0 in) | formerly Corcoran Gallery of Art, Washington, DC |
| | Sierra Nevada | 1871? | Oil on canvas | 143.5 cm × 97.8 cm (56.5 in × 38.5 in) | Reynolda House Museum of American Art, Winston-Salem, NC36.1257°N 80.2829°W |
| | California–Indian Camp: Scene near Mariposa | 1871? | Oil on canvas mounted on Masonite | 35.6 cm × 53.4 cm (14.0 in × 21.0 in) | Oakland Museum, Oakland, CA |
| | Owens Valley, South Sierra | 1871 | Oil on canvas mounted on Masonite | 23.8 cm × 32.4 cm (9.4 in × 12.8 in) | Oakland Museum, Oakland, CA |
| | Rainbow in the Sierra Nevada (or Rainbow in the Sierra Nevada, California) | 1871? | Oil on panel | 45.7 cm × 61.0 cm (18.0 in × 24.0 in) | Frye Art Museum, Seattle, WA IAP 61021587 |
| | View of Donner Lake, California | 1871? | Oil on paper mounted on canvas | 74.3 cm × 55.6 cm (29.3 in × 21.9 in) | M. H. de Young Memorial Museum, San Francisco, CA IAP 71064041 |
| color image | Dawn at Donner Lake, California | 1871? | Oil on canvas | 54 cm × 73.7 cm (21.3 in × 29.0 in) | Joslyn Art Museum, Omaha, NE41.2603°N 95.9461°W IAP 29990026 |
| | San Francisco Bay | 1871? | Oil on paper mounted on paperboard | 48.5 cm × 35 cm (19.1 in × 13.8 in) | Smithsonian American Art Museum, Washington, DC IAP 08582027 |
| | In the Valley of the Yosemite | 1872 | Oil on canvas | | Honolulu Museum of Art, Honolulu, Hawaiʻi |
| | Mount Brewer from King's River Canyon | 1872 | Oil on paper mounted to board | | Kalamazoo Institute of Art, Kalamazoo, Michigan |
| | Seals on the Rocks, Farallon Islands (Scene: Farallon Islands) | 1872? | Oil on canvas | 66 cm × 91 cm (26.0 in × 35.8 in) or 76.2 cm × 111.8 cm (30 in × 44 in) | IAP 63005192 IAP 61071739 |
| | Indians in Council, California | 1872? | Oil on canvas | 40.4 cm × 55.5 cm (15.9 in × 21.9 in) | Smithsonian American Art Museum, Washington, DC |
| | Seal Rocks, Farallones [Farallon Islands] (Scene: Farallon Islands) | 1872 | Oil on paper mounted on paperboard | 34.3 cm × 48.2 cm (13.5 in × 19.0 in) | Museum of Fine Art, Boston, MA IAP 20490131 |
| color image | The Grizzly Giant Sequoia, Mariposa Grove, California (or Redwood Trees) | 1872? | Oil on paper mounted on cardboard | 75.7 cm × 54.2 cm (29.8 in × 21.3 in) | Los Angeles County Museum of Art, Los Angeles, CA IAP 02960009 |
| view | Farallon Islands | 1872 | Oil on cardboard mounted on canvas | 35.6 cm × 48.3 cm (14.0 in × 19.0 in) | California Palace of the Legion of Honor/M. H. de Young Memorial Museum, San Francisco, CA IAP 6264143237.783889°N 122.501111°W IAP 71064402 |
| | Yosemite Winter Scene | 1872 | Oil on canvas | 81.6 cm × 122.2 cm (32.1 in × 48.1 in) | Bancroft Library, University of California, Berkeley, CA |
| | Seal Rock (or Seal Rock, Farallon Islands) | 1872? | oil on canvas | 94 cm × 147.3 cm (37.0 in × 58.0 in) | IAP 61022806 |
| | California Redwoods | 1872 | Oil on paper | 48.6 cm × 35.6 cm (19.1 in × 14.0 in) | Saint Louis Art Museum, St Louis, MO |
| | Cathedral Rocks, Yosemite Valley | 1872? | Oil on paper mounted on canvas | 35.6 cm × 50.8 cm (14.0 in × 20.0 in) | Smithsonian American Art Museum, Washington, DC IAP 08583922 |
| | Farralones Islands, Pacific Ocean (or Farallon Islands, Pacific Ocean) (Scene: Farallon Islands) | 1872 | Oil on paperboard | 41.2 cm × 48.9 cm (16.2 in × 19.3 in) | Hirshhorn Museum and Sculpture Garden, Washington, DC |
| | Seal Rock, California | 1872? | oil on paper mounted on canvas | 40.6 cm × 55.9 cm (16.0 in × 22.0 in) | |
| | Sunrise in the Sierras | 1872? | Oil on paper mounted on paperboard | 33.7 cm × 48.2 cm (13.3 in × 19.0 in) | Smithsonian American Art Museum, Washington, DC IAP 08580169 |
| | Lake Tahoe | 1872 | Oil on canvas | 47.9 cm × 33.9 cm (18.9 in × 13.3 in) | Amon Carter Museum of American Art, Fort Worth, Texas |
| view b&w | Seal Rocks, Farallon Islands | 1873? | Oil on canvas | 76.2 cm × 114.3 cm (30.0 in × 45.0 in) | New Britain Museum of American Art, New Britain, CT IAP 07130004 |
| | Autumn in the Sierras | 1873 | Oil on canvas | 182.9 cm × 304.8 cm (72.0 in × 120.0 in) | City of Plainfield, NJ IAP 8298012140.615444°N 74.415775°W |
| | A Golden Summer Day Near Oakland | 1873 | oil on paper mounted on masonite | 41.9 cm × 55.9 cm (16.5 in × 22.0 in) | Crocker Art Museum, Sacramento, California |
| | Giant Redwood Trees of California | 1874 | Oil on canvas | 123.4 cm × 109.2 cm (48.6 in × 43.0 in) | Berkshire Museum, Pittsfield, Massachusetts |
| color image | Dogwood | 1875+ | Oil on canvas | 284.0 cm × 222.5 cm (111.8 in × 87.6 in) | Haggin Museum, Stockton, CA IAP 04950002 |
| color image | Evening on Oneida Lake (or Oneida Lake) | 1875+ | Oil on canvas | 81.3 cm × 114.3 cm (32.0 in × 45.0 in) | Haggin Museum, Stockton, CA IAP 82980075 |
| color image | Forest Monarchs | 1875+ | Oil on canvas backed with panel | 80 cm × 120.7 cm (31.5 in × 47.5 in) | Haggin Museum, Stockton, CA IAP 82980070 |
| | Expedition under Vizcaino Landing at Monterey 1601 | 1875 | Oil on canvas | 182.9 cm × 309.9 cm (72.0 in × 122.0 in) | United States Capitol, Washington, DC38.889722°N 77.008889°W |
| color image | Hetch Hetchy Canyon | 1875 | Oil on canvas | 130.49 cm x 106.04 cm (51.37 in x 41.75 in) | Mount Holyoke College Art Museum, South Hadley, MA |
| | Sacramento Valley in Spring | 1875 | Oil on canvas | 139.7 cm × 215.8 cm (55.0 in × 85.0 in) | California Palace of the Legion of Honor, San Francisco, CA IAP 71068689 |
| | San Rafael, California | 1875? | Oil on canvas | 83.5 cm × 121.9 cm (32.9 in × 48.0 in) | Fruitlands Museum, Harvard, MA |
| | Sunrise on the Matterhorn | 1875 | Oil on canvas | 148.6 cm × 108.3 cm (58.5 in × 42.6 in) | Metropolitan Museum of Art |
| | The Discovery of the Hudson | 1875 | Oil on canvas | 182.9 cm × 309.9 cm (72.0 in × 122.0 in) | United States Capitol, Washington, DC |
| | Mount Corcoran | 1875? | Oil on canvas | 154.9 cm × 244.4 cm (61.0 in × 96.2 in) | National Gallery of Art, Washington, DC |
| | A View from Sacramento | 1875 | Oil on paper | 66 cm × 45.7 cm (26.0 in × 18.0 in) | Public collection |
| | California Spring | 1875 | Oil on canvas | 137.8 cm × 214 cm (54.3 in × 84.3 in) or 29.1 in × 40.9 in (73.8 cm × 104 cm) | M. H. de Young Memorial Museum, San Francisco, CA IAP 04150128 |
| | Bay of Monterey | 1875 | Oil on paper | 34.9 cm × 47.6 cm (13.7 in × 18.7 in) | Public collection |
| | Buffalo Country | 1875 | | | |
| | Mount Adams, Washington | 1875 | Oil on canvas | 138 cm × 213 cm (54.3 in × 83.9 in) | Princeton University Art Museum |
| | The Ambush | 1876? | Oil on canvas | 76.2 cm × 128.3 cm (30.0 in × 50.5 in) | Museum of Fine Art, Boston, MA IAP 20490129 |
| | Banana Trees | 1876? | Oil on canvas mounted on Masonite | 48.9 cm × 34.3 cm (19.3 in × 13.5 in) | Museum of Fine Art, Boston, MA IAP 20490135 |
| | Rocky Mountains, Colorado | 1876? | Oil on paper on Masonite | 34.9 cm × 49.5 cm (13.7 in × 19.5 in) | Museum of Fine Art, Boston, MA |
| | Street in Nassau | 1877? | Oil on board upon canvas | 35.5 cm × 48.3 cm (14.0 in × 19.0 in) | Museo Thyssen-Bornemisza, Madrid, Spain |
| b&w image | Sail Boats | 1877+ | Oil on paperboard | 34.9 cm × 48.2 cm (13.7 in × 19.0 in) | Museum of Fine Art, Boston, MA IAP 20490136 |
| view | Mount Whitney | 1877 | Oil on canvas | 68.875 in × 116.625 in (174.9 cm × 296.2 cm) | Rockwell Museum, Corning, NY 42.142576°N 77.052918°W |
| | The Rocky Mountains, Longs Peak | 1877 | Oil on canvas | 157.5 cm × 248.9 cm (62.0 in × 98.0 in) | Denver Public Library, Denver, CO39.7375°N 104.988056°W (On Loan to Denver Art Museum) |
| color image | After a Norther, Bahamas | 1878+ | Oil on canvas | 139.2 cm × 215.4 cm (54.8 in × 84.8 in) | Haggin Museum, Stockton, CA |
| | Rocky Mountain Sheep | 1879? | Oil on paper mounted on cardboard | | |
| | Moose Hunters' Camp, Nova Scotia | 1880? | Oil on canvas | 67.3 cm × 92.2 cm (26.5 in × 36.3 in) | Museum of Fine Art, Boston, MA IAP 63001410 IAP 20490134 |
| | The Falls of St. Anthony | 1880? | Oil on canvas | 96.8 cm × 153.7 cm (38.1 in × 60.5 in) | Museo Thyssen-Bornemisza, Madrid, Spain |
| | Palm Trees with a Domed Church | 1880? | Oil on paper mounted on canvas | 35.5 cm × 49.5 cm (14.0 in × 19.5 in) | Museum of Fine Art, Boston, MA IAP 20490137 |
| | Weeping Oaks, Clear Creek [California] | 1880 | Oil on canvas | 90.2 cm × 130.8 cm (35.5 in × 51.5 in) | University of Denver, Denver, CO39.678333°N 104.962222°W IAP 82980084 |
| | Storm Clouds | 1880 | Oil on canvas | 36.8 cm × 49.5 cm (14.5 in × 19.5 in) | The White House, Washington, D.C. |
| | West Indies Coast Scene | 1880? | Oil on paper mounted on fiberboard | 34.3 cm × 47 cm (13.5 in × 18.5 in) | Hirshhorn Museum and Sculpture Garden, Washington, DC IAP 61570013 |
| | By a Mountain Lake | 1880? | Oil on canvas | 77.0 cm × 112.5 cm (30.3 in × 44.3 in) | IAP 20090979 |
| | Old Faithful | 1881 | Oil on paper mounted on canvas | 49.5 cm × 34.9 cm (19.5 in × 13.7 in) | Private Collection IAP 80044140 |
| | Old Faithful | 1881? | Oil | 48.9 cm × 34.3 cm (19.3 in × 13.5 in) | IAP 80044140 |
| color image | Saint Lawrence River from the Citadel, Quebec | 1881? | Oil on paper mounted on canvas | 55.9 cm × 77.5 cm (22.0 in × 30.5 in) | Museum of Fine Art, Boston, MA IAP 20490138 |
| | Geyser, Yellowstone Park | 1881? | Oil on paper mounted on paperboard | 35.5 cm × 49.5 cm (14.0 in × 19.5 in) | Museum of Fine Art, Boston, MA IAP 20490132 |
| | Yellowstone Falls (or Lower Yellow Stone Falls; or Lower Falls of the Yellowstone) | 1881 | Oil on paper mounted on canvas | 48.9 cm × 34.3 cm (19.3 in × 13.5 in) | Georgia Museum of Art, University of Georgia, Athens, GA IAP 1042000333.941037°N 83.370126°W |
| | Gates of the Yosemite | 1882? | Oil on paper | 35.6 cm × 50.8 cm (14.0 in × 20.0 in) | Smithsonian American Art Museum, Washington, DC IAP 62170555 IAP 80040364 IAP 0858392138.897°N 77.022689°W |
| color image | Moose in a Forest Glen (or The Moose) | 1885? | Oil | 122 cm × 183 cm (48.0 in × 72.0 in) or 126 cm × 108 cm (49.6 in × 42.5 in) | Haggin Museum, Stockton, CA IAP 70890071 IAP 82980078 |
| color image | Storm on the Matterhorn | 1886 | Oil on canvas on masonite | 136.5 cm × 212.1 cm (53.7 in × 83.5 in) | Joslyn Art Museum, Omaha, NE IAP 29990027 |
| | Interior of a Library, Minneapolis | 1886? | Oil on canvas/paper mounted on aluminum | 50.2 cm × 36.9 cm (19.8 in × 14.5 in) | Museum of Fine Art, Boston, MA IAP 20490139 |
| | Autumn Woods (or Autumn Woods, Oneida County, New York) | 1886 | Oil on canvas | 137.2 cm × 213.4 cm (54 in × 84 in) | New York Historical Society, New York, NY IAP 36361739 40.779167°N 73.974167°W |
| color image | Indian Canoe | 1886 | Oil on canvas | 69.2 cm × 90.8 cm (27.2 in × 35.7 in) | Blanton Museum of Art, Austin, TX IAP 50080026 |
| | The Wave (or The Surf; or The Turquoise Sea) | 1887 | Oil on canvas | 152.4 cm × 182.9 cm (60.0 in × 72.0 in) | Haggin Museum, Stockton, CA IAP 82980072 |
| | Nassau Harbor | 1887+ | Oil on paper mounted on paperboard | 37.5 cm × 50.8 cm (14.8 in × 20.0 in) | California Palace of the Legion of Honor/M. H. de Young Memorial Museum, San Francisco, CA IAP 71068688 |
| | Canoes | 1888 | Oil on canvas/paper | 33 cm × 47 cm (13.0 in × 18.5 in) | IAP 82980152 |
| | The Last of the Buffalo | 1888 | Oil on canvas | 181 cm × 302.9 cm (71.3 in × 119.3 in) | National Gallery of Art, Washington, DC |
| | Buffalo Hunter | 1888? | Oil on canvas | 66 cm × 91.4 cm (26.0 in × 36.0 in) | Zimmerli Art Museum at Rutgers University, New Brunswick, NJ40.500017°N 74.445857°W |
| | Sketch for "The Last of the Buffalo" | 1888? | Oil on board | 37.5 cm × 48.3 cm (14.8 in × 19.0 in) | Whitney Gallery of Western Art, Buffalo Bill Historical Center, Cody, WY44.525055°N 109.073135°W |
| | Study for "The Last of the Buffalo" | 1888? | Oil on canvas | 62.9 cm × 91.1 cm (24.8 in × 35.9 in) | M. H. de Young Memorial Museum, San Francisco, CA |
| | Sailboats on the Hudson at Irvington | 1889 | Oil on canvas | 38.1 cm × 53.3 cm (15.0 in × 21.0 in) | Public collection |
| | Sunrise at Glacier Station (or Sunrise from Glacier Station) | 1889? | Oil on canvas | 76.2 cm × 111.8 cm (30.0 in × 44.0 in) | Public collection IAP 73260763 |
| | Alaskan Coast Range | 1889 | Oil on paper mounted on paperboard | 35.2 cm × 49.2 cm (13.9 in × 19.4 in) | Smithsonian American Art Museum, Washington, DC IAP 08580168 |
| color image | Mount Sir Donald (or Mount Sir Donald, Asulkan Glacier) | 1889? | Oil on canvas | 69.5 cm × 49.5 cm (27.4 in × 19.5 in) | Haggin Museum, Stockton, CA IAP 82980074 |
| | Alaska | 1889? | Oil on canvas | 35.6 cm × 50.8 cm (14.0 in × 20.0 in) | Indianapolis Museum of Art, Indianapolis, IN39.8259°N 86.1855°W |
| | Princess Louisa Inlet, British Columbia [correct title?] | 1889? | Oil on canvas | 73.7 cm × 109.3 cm (29.0 in × 43.0 in) | Art Institute of Chicago, Chicago, IL41.879444°N 87.623889°W |
| | Rocky Mountains in the Selkirk Range Near the Canadian Border (or Rocky Mountains in the Selkirk Range, near the Canadian Border, Mount Sir Donald) | 1889? | Oil on canvas | 212.1 cm × 146 cm (83.5 in × 57.5 in) | New Bedford Free Public Library, New Bedford, MA41.634967°N 70.927627°W IAP 22140029 |
| | Wreck of the "Ancon," Loring Bay, Alaska | 1889 | Oil on paper mounted on masonite | 35.5 cm × 50.2 cm (14.0 in × 19.8 in) | Museum of Fine Art, Boston, MA IAP 20490140 |
| | Mt. Baker from the Fraser River (or Mt. Baker from Skyline Divide; or Mt. Rainier from the Southeast; or Three Sisters) | 1890? | Oil on paper | 43.2 cm × 48.3 cm (17 in × 19 in) | IAP 67530201 |
| view | Mt. Baker, Washington, from the Frazier River (or Encampment in the Rockies) | 1890 | Oil on paper mounted to canvas | 36.2 cm × 49.8 cm (14.3 in × 19.6 in) | Brooklyn Museum, Brooklyn, NY IAP 35680044 |
| color image | Canadian Rockies | 1890? | Oil on canvas | 68.6 cm × 47 cm (27.0 in × 18.5 in) | Haggin Museum, Stockton, CA IAP 82980073 |
| | Island of New Providence | 1891 | Oil on paper | 45.7 cm × 61 cm (18.0 in × 24.0 in) | Public collection |
| | Mount Baker, Washington | 1891 | Oil on canvas | 19 cm × 13.5 cm (7.5 in × 5.3 in) | |
| color image | In the Yosemite Valley | 1891? | Oil on canvas | 59.7 cm × 80 cm (23.5 in × 31.5 in) | Haggin Museum, Stockton, CA IAP 82980076 |
| | The Landing of Columbus | 1892 | Oil on canvas | 274.3 cm × 518.2 cm (108.0 in × 204.0 in) | Destroyed in a fire in 1960 at the American Museum of Natural History, New York. (There are two other extant versions.)IAP 82980052 |
| color image | Butterfly | 1892 | Oil on paper | 12.7 cm × 20.3 cm (5.0 in × 8.0 in) | Westmoreland Museum of American Art, Greensburg, PA IAP 45130076 |
| | Butterfly | 1893 | Oil on paper | 41.84 cm × 28.06 cm (16.5 in × 11.0 in) | The White House, Washington, D.C. |
| | The Landing of Columbus (or Landing of Columbus, October 1492; or The Landing of Columbus at San Salvador) | 1893? | Oil on canvas | 182.9 cm × 307.3 cm (72.0 in × 121.0 in) | Newark Museum, Newark, NJ IAP 31820036 |
| | Landing of Columbus at San Salvador (or Landing of Columbus) | 1893? | Oil on canvas | 203.2 cm × 304.8 cm (80.0 in × 120.0 in) | City of Plainfield, Plainfield, NJ IAP 82980122 |
| | The Morteratsch Glacier Upper Engadine Valley Pontresina | 1895 | Oil on canvas | 96.5 cm × 152.4 cm (38.0 in × 60.0 in) | Brooklyn Museum, Brooklyn, NY |
| | Yosemite Valley | 1898? | Oil on canvas | 137.2 cm × 213.7 cm (54.0 in × 84.1 in) | Stark Museum of Art, Orange, TX30.093497°N 93.736183°W |
| | The Golden Gate | 1900 | Oil on canvas | 96.5 cm × 152.4 cm (38.0 in × 60.0 in) | Public collection |

=== Undated works ===
Table featuring works by Albert Bierstadt
| Image | Title | Dimensions | Notes | Current Location | Ref. |
|---|---|---|---|---|---|
| | A Strike – Salmon Fishing, Cascapedia River, Canada | Oil | 61 cm × 91.4 cm (24.0 in × 36.0 in) | IAP 61020603IAP 87230148 Private Collection | |
| | Tropical Landscape with Fishing Boats in Bay | Oil | 45.2 cm × 74.4 cm (17.8 in × 29.3 in) | IAP 61023558 | |
| | Yosemite Valley | Oil on paper mounted on canvas | 41.7 cm × 50.8 cm (16.4 in × 20.0 in) | Lowe Art Museum | |
| | Home of the Rainbow, Horseshoe Falls, Niagara | Oil | 41.9 cm × 55.9 cm (16.5 in × 22.0 in) | IAP 80030003 | |
| | Lower Yosemite Valley | Oil on paper | 49.5 cm × 34.2 cm (19.5 in × 13.5 in) | | |
| | Niagara from the American Side | Oil on canvas | 52.1 cm × 34.3 cm (20.5 in × 13.5 in) | | |
| | Pioneers of the Woods, California | Oil on canvas | 48.3 cm × 65.4 cm (19.0 in × 25.7 in) | High Museum of Art33.79051°N 84.38517°W | |
| | Wasatch Mountains, Utah | Oil on canvas | 34.3 cm × 48.3 cm (13.5 in × 19.0 in) | IAP 62500023 | |
| | Mt. Hood, Oregon | Oil on paper | 35.1 cm × 48.3 cm (13.8 in × 19 in) | Currier Museum of Art | |
| | Western Lake | Oil over lithograph | 30.5 cm × 47 cm (12.0 in × 18.5 in) | Herbert F. Johnson Museum of Art, Cornell University(attributed to Albert Bierstadt) | |
| | Yosemite Valley | Oil on canvas | 60 cm × 40 cm (23.6 in × 15.7 in) | Herbert F. Johnson Museum of Art, Cornell University, Ithaca, NY IAP 35010068 (attributed to Albert Bierstadt) | |
| | Finsterhorn | Oil on canvas | 30 cm × 20 cm (11.8 in × 7.9 in) | Herbert F. Johnson Museum of Art, Cornell UniversityIAP 35010031 | |
| | Spur at the Edge at Sunset, Grindewald (or Spur of the Edge at Sunset, Grindewald) | Oil on canvas | 25.4 cm × 19.1 cm (10.0 in × 7.5 in) | Herbert F. Johnson Museum of Art, Cornell UniversityIAP 35010030 | |
| | Mountain Study | Oil on paperboard | 16 cm × 24.1 cm (6.3 in × 9.5 in) | Stark Museum of ArtIAP 60970148 | |
| | A Quiet Cove | Oil on canvas | 61.0 cm × 58.4 cm (24 in × 23 in) | St. Johnsbury AthenaeumIAP 53970055 | |
| color image | The Trappers, Lake Tahoe | Oil on canvas | 49.5 cm × 70.5 cm (19.5 in × 27.8 in) | Joslyn Art Museum, Omaha, NE IAP 29990025 | |
| view in collection search | Landscape | Oil on paper mounted on canvas | 34.3 cm × 49.5 cm (13.5 in × 19.5 in) | Newark Museum, Newark, NJ | |
| | Autumn in New Hampshire | Oil on canvas | 34.9 cm × 50.2 cm (13.7 in × 19.8 in) | Lauren Rogers Museum of Art | |
| | Boston Harbor at Night | Oil on canvas | 45.7 cm × 58.1 cm (18.0 in × 22.9 in) | Mead Art Museum, Amherst College | |
| | Brook in Woods | Oil on canvas | 50.8 cm × 76.2 cm (20.0 in × 30.0 in) | Montclair Art Museum | |
| | Canyon and River | Oil on academy board | 30.5 cm × 45.7 cm (12.0 in × 18.0 in) | Delaware Art Museum39.765°N 75.565°W | |
| | Florida Scene | Oil on paper | 34.9 cm × 48.5 cm (13.7 in × 19.1 in) | Smith College Museum of Art | |
| | Hetch Hetchy Cañon, California | Oil on canvas | 130.3 cm × 106.7 cm (51.3 in × 42.0 in) | Mount Holyoke College Art Museum | |
| | Iceberg | Oil on paper | 14.3 cm × 22.9 cm (5.6 in × 9.0 in) | Hirshhorn Museum and Sculpture Garden | |
| | Indian Sunset: Deer by a Lake | Oil on canvas | 77.2 cm × 113 cm (30.4 in × 44.5 in) | Yale University Art Gallery | |
| | Lakeshore Landscape | Oil on canvas | 34.6 cm × 47.3 cm (13.6 in × 18.6 in) | Minneapolis Institute of ArtsIAP 26010014 | |
| | Lander's Peak, Wyoming | Oil on canvas | 92.8 cm × 66.7 cm (36.5 in × 26.3 in) | Los Angeles County Museum of Art | |
| | Landscape | Oil on canvas | 13 cm × 18.8 cm (5.1 in × 7.4 in) | Newark MuseumIAP 31820037 | |
| | Mountain Landscape with Sunset | Oil on paper | 8.2 cm × 9.5 cm (3.2 in × 3.7 in) | Lyman Allyn Art Museum | |
| | Mountain Landscape | Oil on paper mounted on canvas | 27 cm × 38.1 cm (10.6 in × 15.0 in) | Speed Art Museum38.217861°N 85.760917°W | |
| | Mountain Scene | Oil on cardboard | 34.9 cm × 48.2 cm (13.7 in × 19.0 in) | Oakland Museum | |
| | Ox | Oil on cardboard | 29.2 cm × 46.3 cm (11.5 in × 18.2 in) | Oakland Museum | |
| | Redwood Trees | Oil on paper mounted on canvas | 76.2 cm × 54.7 cm (30.0 in × 21.5 in) | Los Angeles County Museum of Art | |
| | Rocky Mountain Landscape | Oil on paper mounted on canvas | 31.8 cm × 45.7 cm (12.5 in × 18.0 in) | Colorado Springs Fine Arts Center | |
| | Rocky Mountains | Oil on canvas | 45.8 cm × 67.3 cm (18.0 in × 26.5 in) | Phoenix Art Museum | |
| | Seals on the California Coast | Oil on millboard | 41.9 cm × 58.4 cm (16.5 in × 23.0 in) | Oakland MuseumIAP 03390005 | |
| | Shady Pool White Mountains New Hampshire [correct title?] | Oil on canvas | 57.2 cm × 76.2 cm (22.5 in × 30.0 in) | Hirshhorn Museum and Sculpture Garden | |
| | Sunrise in the Hetch Hetchy Valley, California | Oil on canvas | 75.5 cm × 111.1 cm (29.7 in × 43.7 in) | George Walter Vincent Smith Art Museum | |
| | Sunset near the Platte River (or Salt Lick at Sunset Glow) | Oil on canvas | 69.8 cm × 99.1 cm (27.5 in × 39.0 in) or 65.4 cm × 90.2 cm (25.7 in × 35.5 in) | New Bedford Free Public Library | IAP 82980110 |
| | Sunset on the Plains | Oil on canvas | 48.2 cm × 66 cm (19.0 in × 26.0 in) | Spencer Museum of Art | |
| | Teton Range, Moose, Wyoming [incorrect title] | Oil on paper mounted on canvas | 31.1 cm × 47 cm (12.2 in × 18.5 in) | Colorado Springs Fine Arts Center | |
| | The Blue Grotto, Capri | Oil on cardboard | 17.4 cm × 22.2 cm (6.9 in × 8.7 in) | Walters Art Museum | |
| | The Buffalo Trail | Oil on canvas | 81.3 cm × 121.9 cm (32.0 in × 48.0 in) | Museum of Fine Arts, Boston | |
| | The Conflagration | Oil on paper | 28.6 cm × 38.4 cm (11.3 in × 15.1 in) | Worcester Art Museum | |
| | The Hetch Hetchy Valley, California | Oil on canvas | 66.3 cm × 92.6 cm (26.1 in × 36.5 in) | Michele & Donald D'Amour Museum of Fine Arts | |
| | The Hetch-Hetchy Valley, California | Oil on canvas | 94.6 cm × 147.9 cm (37.2 in × 58.2 in) | Wadsworth Atheneum | |
| | The High Sierras | Oil on millboard | 30.5 cm × 45.7 cm (12.0 in × 18.0 in) | Oakland Museum | |
| | The Pacific Coast (The Bay of San Francisco) | Oil on board | 33 cm × 50.8 cm (13.0 in × 20.0 in) | Oakland Museum | IAP 71066292 |
| | The Rocky Mountains | Oil on canvas | 33.7 cm × 46.3 cm (13.3 in × 18.2 in) | Denver Art Museum | |
| | The Snow Mountain | Oil on panel | 35.6 cm × 45.7 cm (14.0 in × 18.0 in) | Addison Gallery of American Art | |
| | View of Oakland | Oil on canvas mounted on cardboard | 17.1 cm × 26 cm (6.7 in × 10.2 in) | Oakland Museum | |
| | View of the Wetterhorn from Grindelwald | Oil on paper | 72.4 cm × 50.2 cm (28.5 in × 19.8 in) | San Diego Museum of Art | |
| | Waterfall Landscape | Oil on canvas | 101.7 cm × 76.2 cm (40.0 in × 30.0 in) | Zimmerli Art Museum at Rutgers University | |
| | Waterfall [Minnehaha Falls, Minneapolis, Minnesota] | Oil on canvas | 55.8 cm × 76.2 cm (22.0 in × 30.0 in) | Zimmerli Art Museum at Rutgers University | |
| | Yosemite Falls [incorrect title] | Oil on paper mounted on canvas | 48.3 cm × 35.6 cm (19.0 in × 14.0 in) | Detroit Institute of Arts | |
| | Yosemite Falls | Oil on canvas | 91.4 cm × 66.3 cm (36.0 in × 26.1 in) | Worcester Art Museum | |
| | Yosemite Valley | Oil on paper mounted on canvas | 34.9 cm × 47.6 cm (13.7 in × 18.7 in) | Smith College Museum of Art | |
| | Yosemite | Oil on canvas | 34.3 cm × 48.2 cm (13.5 in × 19.0 in) | Museum of Fine Arts, Boston | |
| | Irvington Woods | | | | |
| | Woodland Sunset | Watercolor on paper | 20.2 cm × 8.4 cm (8.0 in × 3.3 in) | Los Angeles County Museum of Art, Los Angeles, CA IAP 02960281 | |
| | Sunset – Last Reflections – Cloud Study | | 29.2 cm × 39.1 cm (11.5 in × 15.4 in) | Brooklyn Museum | |
| | Blue and White Cloud | | 19.1 cm × 23.2 cm (7.5 in × 9.1 in) | Brooklyn Museum | |
| | Fishing from a Canoe | | | | |
| | Cloud Study | Oil on paper | 24.1 cm × 34.0 cm (9.5 in × 13.4 in) | IAP 60970133 | |
| | Sailboats on the Hudson River | Oil | 38.1 cm × 61.0 cm (15 in × 24 in) | IAP 63004959 | |
| | Two Horses | Oil on paper mounted on cardboard | 35.2 cm × 49.8 cm (13.9 in × 19.6 in) | Whitney Gallery of Western Art, Buffalo Bill Historical CenterIAP 82980207 | |
| | Elk | Oil on paper | 35 cm × 47 cm (13.8 in × 18.5 in) | Whitney Gallery of Western Art, Buffalo Bill Historical Center, Cody, WY IAP 82980192 | |
| | The Iceberg | Oil on canvas | | MUŻA | |
| | Wooded Hillside | Oil on canvas | | | |
| | Cloud Study With Mountain Peak | Oil on paper | 29.2 cm × 46.0 cm (11.5 in × 18.1 in) | Detroit Institute of Arts | |

== See also ==
- List of paintings by Frederic Edwin Church
- List of paintings by Thomas Cole

== Sources ==
- Media related to Paintings by Albert Bierstadt at Wikimedia Commons
- Inventories of American Painting (IAP), Smithsonian Institution Research Information System(SIRIS)
