= On the Platte River, Nebraska =

1863 oil painting by Albert Bierstadt

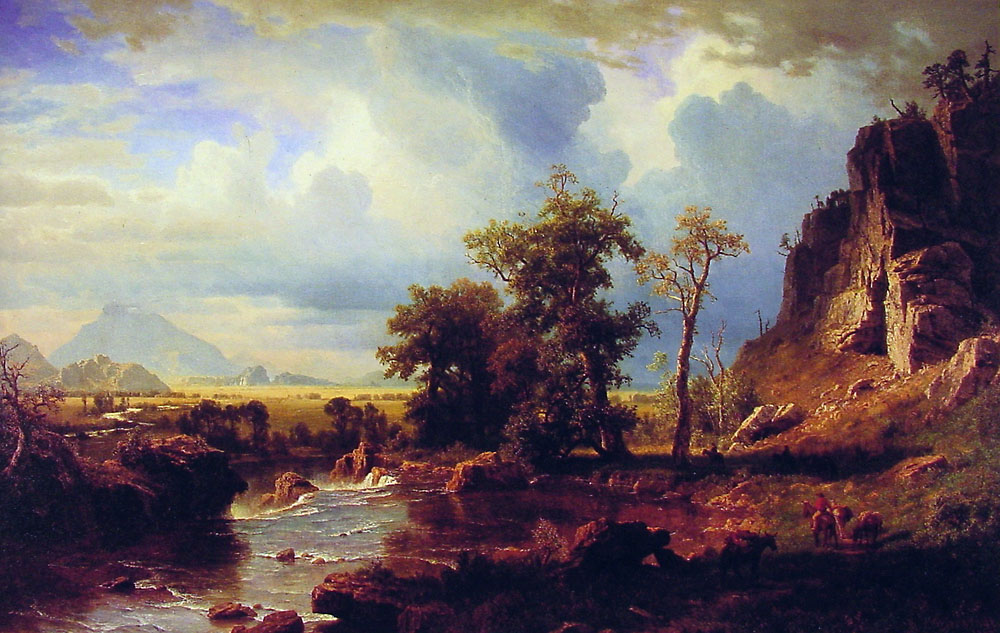
- Artist: Albert Bierstadt
- Year: 1863
- Movement: Hudson River School
- Subject: Platte River
- Dimensions: 18 1/8 × 20 1/8 × 2 1/2 in. (46 × 51.1 × 6.4 cm)
- Location: Gilcrease Museum, Tulsa
- Owner: Smithsonian

On the Platte River, Nebraska is an 1863 oil landscape painting by the Hudson River School artist Albert Bierstadt.

== See also ==
- List of works by Albert Bierstadt
