= R. W. Norton Art Gallery =

Art museum and gardens in Shreveport, Louisiana

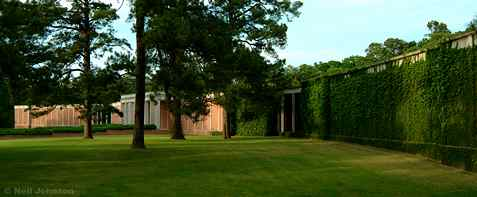
- The gallery building on Creswell Avenue
- Established: 1966
- Location: 4747 Creswell Avenue, Shreveport, Louisiana, United States
- Coordinates: 32°27′32″N 93°44′27″W
- Type: Art museum, botanical garden
- Collection size: American and European art; art of the American West; rare books
- Founder: R. W. Norton Art Foundation
- Website: rwnaf.org

The R. W. Norton Art Gallery (often called simply the Norton) is a private, non-profit art museum and garden in the South Highlands neighborhood of Shreveport, Louisiana. Opened in 1966 by the R. W. Norton Art Foundation, it holds American and European paintings, sculpture and decorative arts, and is best known for its large collections of works by the Western artists Frederic Remington and Charles Marion Russell. The museum also houses a non-circulating research library that includes a double elephant folio of John James Audubon's The Birds of America, and it sits within about 40 acres (16 ha) of landscaped grounds noted for their azaleas. Admission is free; the museum is funded entirely by its foundation.

== History ==
The museum's funds derive from oil. Richard W. Norton Sr. (1886–1940) was among the discoverers of the Rodessa Oil Field in northwestern Louisiana, where he began operations in August 1930. During the boom years that followed, his wife, Annie Miles Norton (1886–1975), and their son, Richard W. Norton Jr. (1919–1974), assembled a substantial collection of fine art.

In 1946, mother and son established the R. W. Norton Art Foundation, a 501(c)(3) charitable foundation, in memory of Norton Sr. The foundation's initial holdings came from the family's own acquisitions. The gallery building, planned as a light, open contemporary structure that could later be enlarged, opened to the public in 1966. It was expanded with a south wing in 1990 and a north wing in 2003.

== Collections ==
The permanent collection spans American art from the colonial period to the present, together with European works. A 2022 profile described it as comprising more than 500 paintings by over 100 artists.

=== Art of the American West ===
The Norton's holdings of Remington and Russell occupy several exhibition rooms and are the core of its national reputation. The Russell collection includes one of the largest and most complete sets of the artist's bronzes ever assembled, numbering 136 subjects, as well as The Trappers' Last Stand (1899), one of his largest oil paintings. The Remington holdings include paintings, watercolors, drawings and sculpture, among them a cast of The Bronco Buster (1895). The gallery published a catalogue of its Remington collection in 1979.

=== Other American art ===
The American collection is particularly strong in nineteenth-century landscape painting, including many works of the Hudson River School. Other holdings include Martin Johnson Heade's still life Giant Magnolias (c. 1880), Mary Cassatt's Mother and Daughter, Both Wearing Large Hats, and a collection of Steuben glass. Artists represented in the collection also include Attilio Piccirilli, Clementine Hunter, Jacob Lawrence and Kadir Nelson. An American history gallery arranges objects chronologically to illustrate the nation's past.

== Research library ==
The Norton Research Library is a non-circulating collection on the fine arts, United States and Louisiana history, and genealogy, and it includes the museum's Rare and Antiquarian Book Collection. After a five-year renovation, during which some 13,000 volumes were catalogued, the library reopened in January 2012. The redesigned reading room uses exotic woods, stone and stained glass, and it displays a portrait of Norton Jr., whose interest in books was the library's origin. Its centerpiece is a double elephant folio of Audubon's The Birds of America (1827–1838); the library also displays a marble bust of Samuel Johnson by Augustus Saint-Gaudens.

== Gardens ==
The museum stands within about 40 acres of landscaped grounds and botanical gardens with walking trails. The gardens contain more than 15,000 azaleas, mostly evergreen Southern Indica hybrids along with deciduous species; the Maple Ridge Garden was added in 2011. The grounds also feature dogwoods, redbuds and maples, and outdoor sculpture. Southern Living named the gardens among the South's favorite spring destinations in its spring 2005 issue. The Azalea Society of America lists the Norton among the public gardens with notable azalea collections.

== Exhibitions and programs ==
In addition to its permanent galleries, the Norton presents traveling and in-house special exhibitions; past examples include photographs of the Vietnam War and a show of Cuban art. Since about 2017 the museum has held BLOOM!, an annual spring juried art exhibition inspired by the azalea season; its tenth edition took place in 2026. Other recurring programs include free guided tours, outdoor film screenings, a children's reading program called Backyard Books, and summer art camps.

== See also ==
- List of museums in Louisiana
- Meadows Museum of Art
