= Grace Hoops =

Painting by Winslow Homer

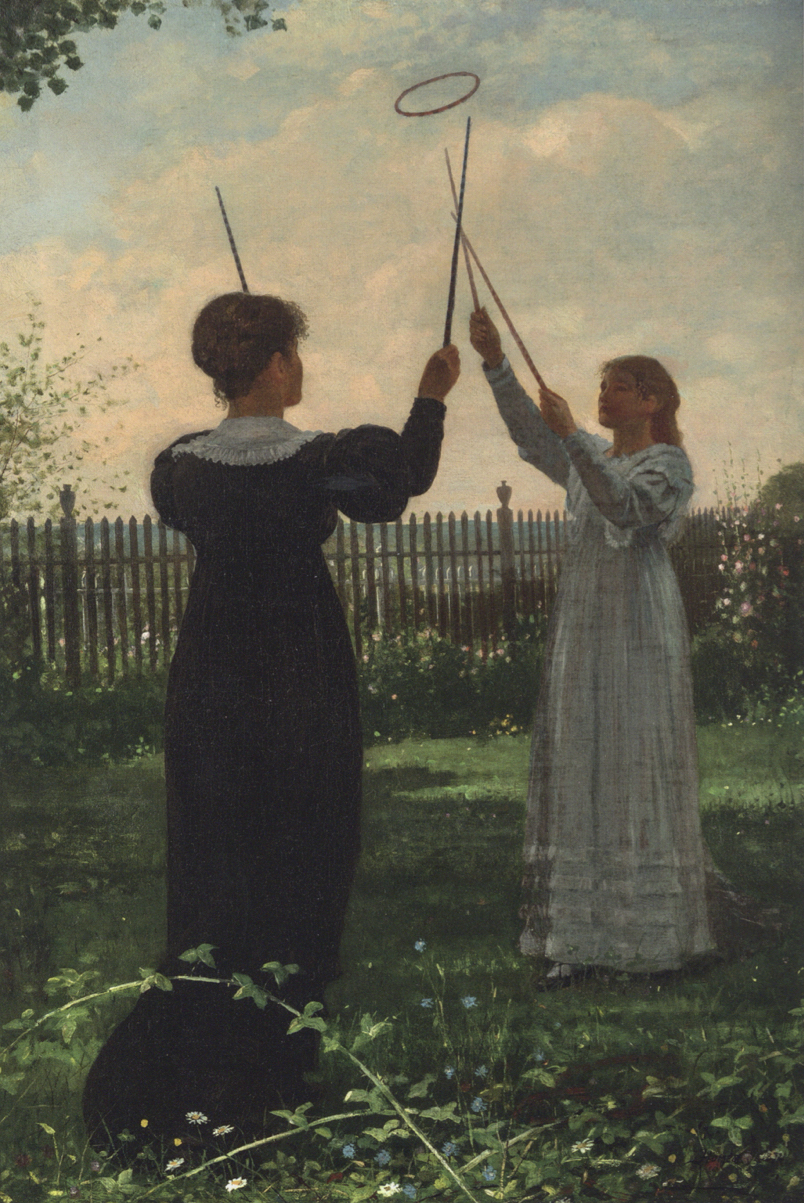
- Artist: Winslow Homer
- Year: 1872
- Medium: Oil on canvas
- Dimensions: 22 in x 15 in (55.9 cm x 38.1 cm)
- Location: McMullen Museum of Art

Grace Hoops is a genre painting by the American artist Winslow Homer. It depicts two young women outdoors playing the game of graces. Scenes of childhood innocence constituted one of Homer's recurring subjects throughout the 1870s. The work is now in the collection of the McMullen Museum of Art at Boston College, having been donated as part of the Carolyn A. and Peter S. Lynch collection.

== Background ==
In the 1870s, Winslow Homer was at a turning point in his life. Free from his obligations as an artist-reporter during the Civil War, he began focusing on his career as a painter.

Homer travelled to Paris between 1867 and 1868. There, he took an interest in scenes of peasants and their life in the countryside. From his stay in France, he is thought to have developed an appreciation for Impressionist techniques such as loose brushwork and the use of outdoor lighting. When he came back to the US, he settled in a studio in New York City and continued working as a magazine illustrator.

In his thirties, the artist went through an experimental period painting a series of canvases mainly depicting the theme of childhood and women. These paintings, including Grace Hoops, differ considerably from his later maritime scenes.

== Painting ==
=== Game of graces ===
The game of graces originated in 19th-century France. Designed for young girls from middle- and upper-class families, the game was meant to entertain children while encouraging gracefulness, in accordance with period ideas of feminine civility.

According to a 19th-century description of the game, “the sticks are held straight, about four inches apart, when trying to catch the hoop; and when the hoop is thrown, they are crossed like a pair of scissors.”

=== Description ===
In Homer's painting, the game is played by two girls gracefully throwing a hoop to each other with sticks. The figure in black holds blue and white striped sticks while the one in white holds red and white sticks. Together, the women are tossing a red and white striped hoop between each other.

The scene takes place in a garden enclosed by a wooden fence, offering a glimpse of the landscape behind it. The dresses and the wide range of flowers indicate a summer day. Ground-ivy and common daisies occupy the foreground, while flowering bushes and pinkish hollyhocks in the background create a bucolic atmosphere. The blue sky is covered by bright, white clouds.

The young ladies are wearing long straight dresses. The dresses have balloon-shaped sleeves and an unnaturally high waistline, as favored by the 1870s fashion. The lack of hats or hair accessories that were typical in social settings suggests an intimate relation between the women.

Staring at the flying hoop, they both look very focused. The young ladies stand in a graceful pose as their chins are up, their arms slightly bent at the elbow and raised in the air accentuating their thin silhouette.

Homer chose to depict a key instant where the hoop is in motion in mid air, and time seems to freeze.

=== Analysis ===
Winslow Homer's interest in childhood was a preoccupation shard by other artists and writers after the Civil War. In 1869, Eugene Benson, writer for the Appletons' Journal and close friend of the painter, referred to childhood in literature as "a special and individual presence, not an accidental and accessory one." Grace Hoops has been described as a meditation on the “transition between childhood and adulthood.” According to the art historian Helen A. Copper, the painting might also be a way for Homer to reflect on his current position as an adult, at the end of his own youth.

== Related works ==
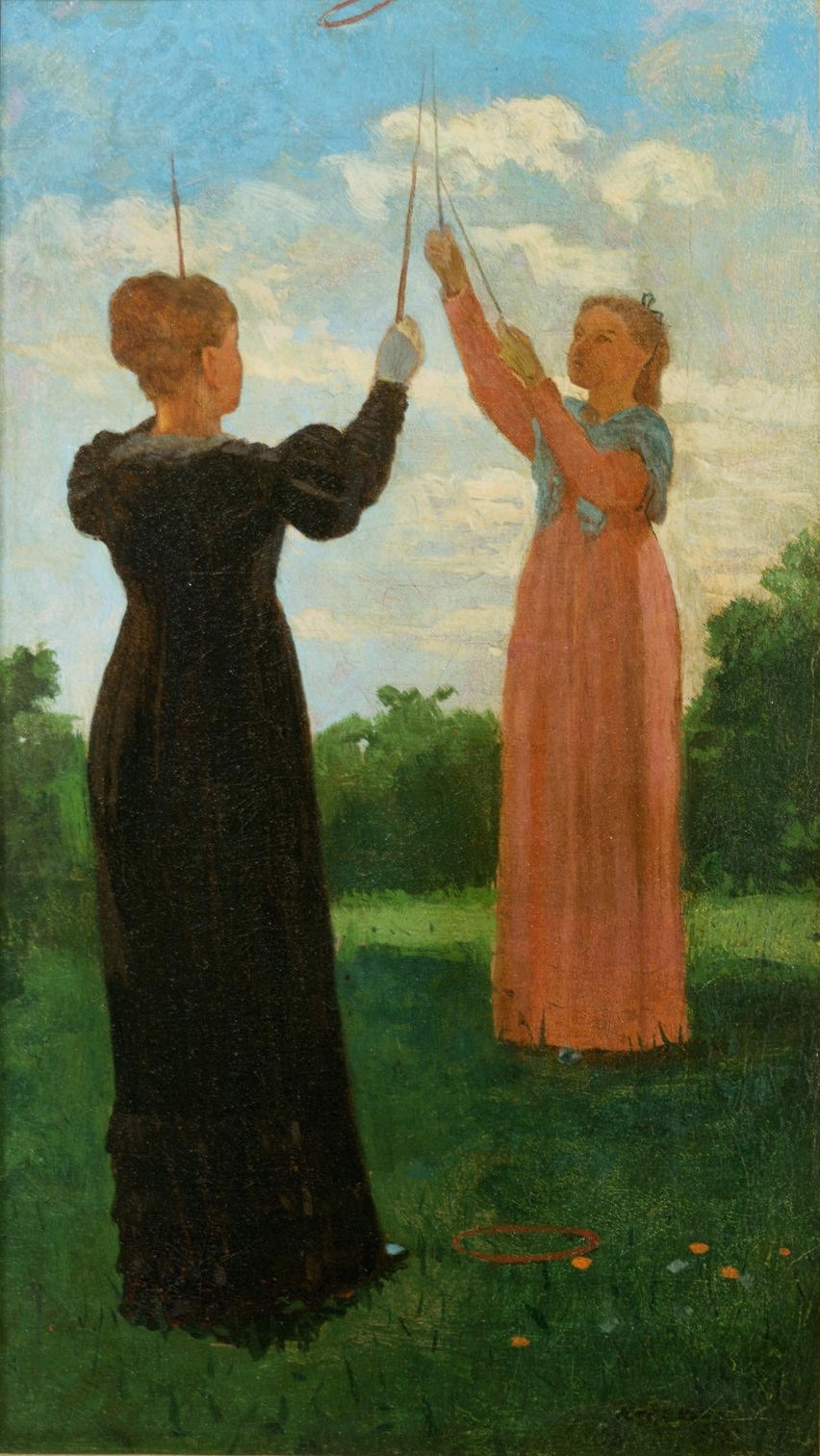
Grace Hoops

A related study, also titled Grace Hoops, is less refined and different in several respects. The girls in the study are playing in a garden with no fencing and few flowers. Homer also uses different colors for the dresses and the natural surroundings. The girl in the black dress wears a smaller collar in the study. In the study, the other girl wears a pink dress with a blue shawl while she wears a white dress in the finished version.

The woman in the black dress at the foreground is thought to be Grace Barret Valentine, who modeled for other paintings of the same year, including An Open Window (1872), At the Window (1872), Reverie (1872) and Salem (1872).

Works with Grace Barret Valentine
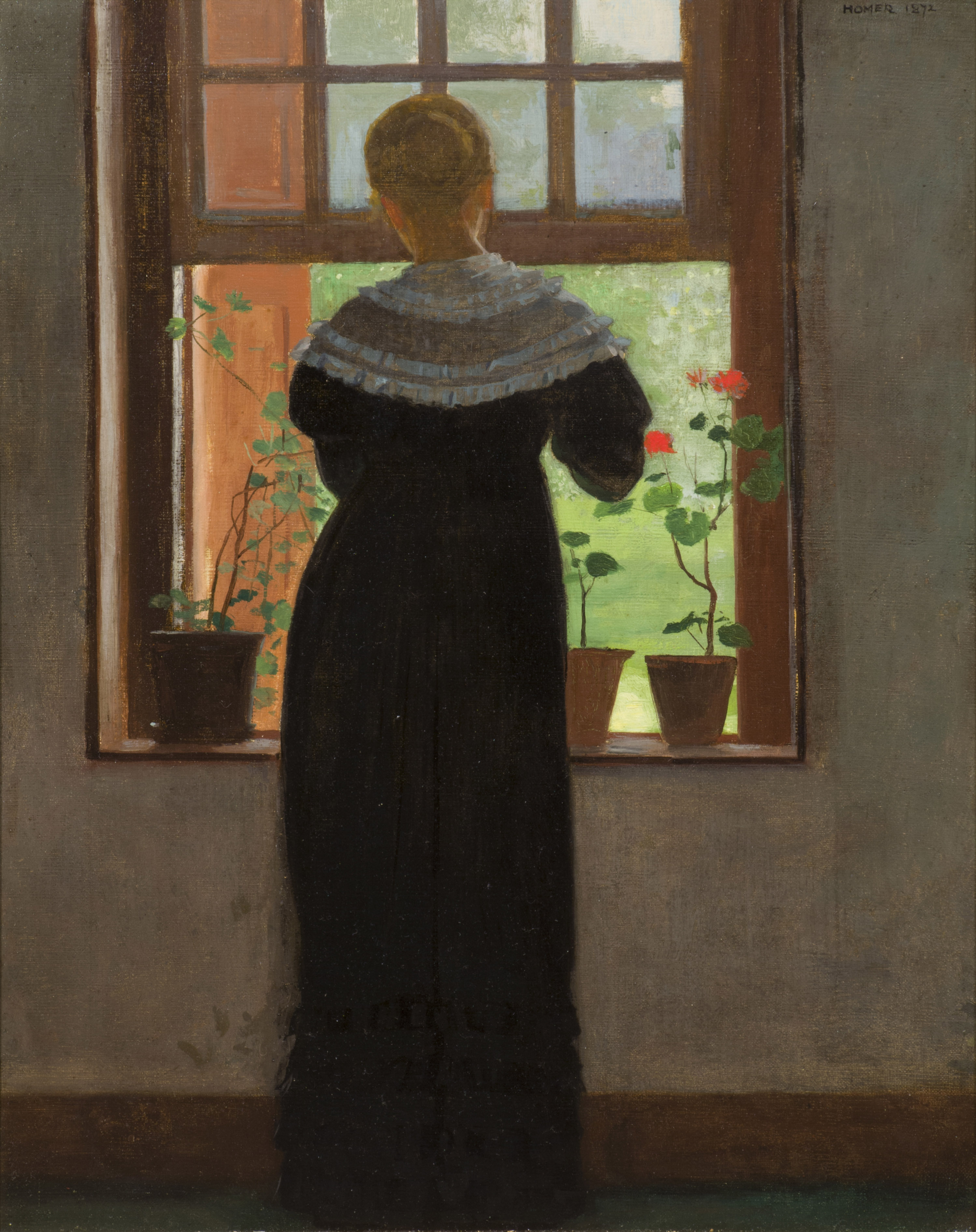
An Open Window, Winslow Homer

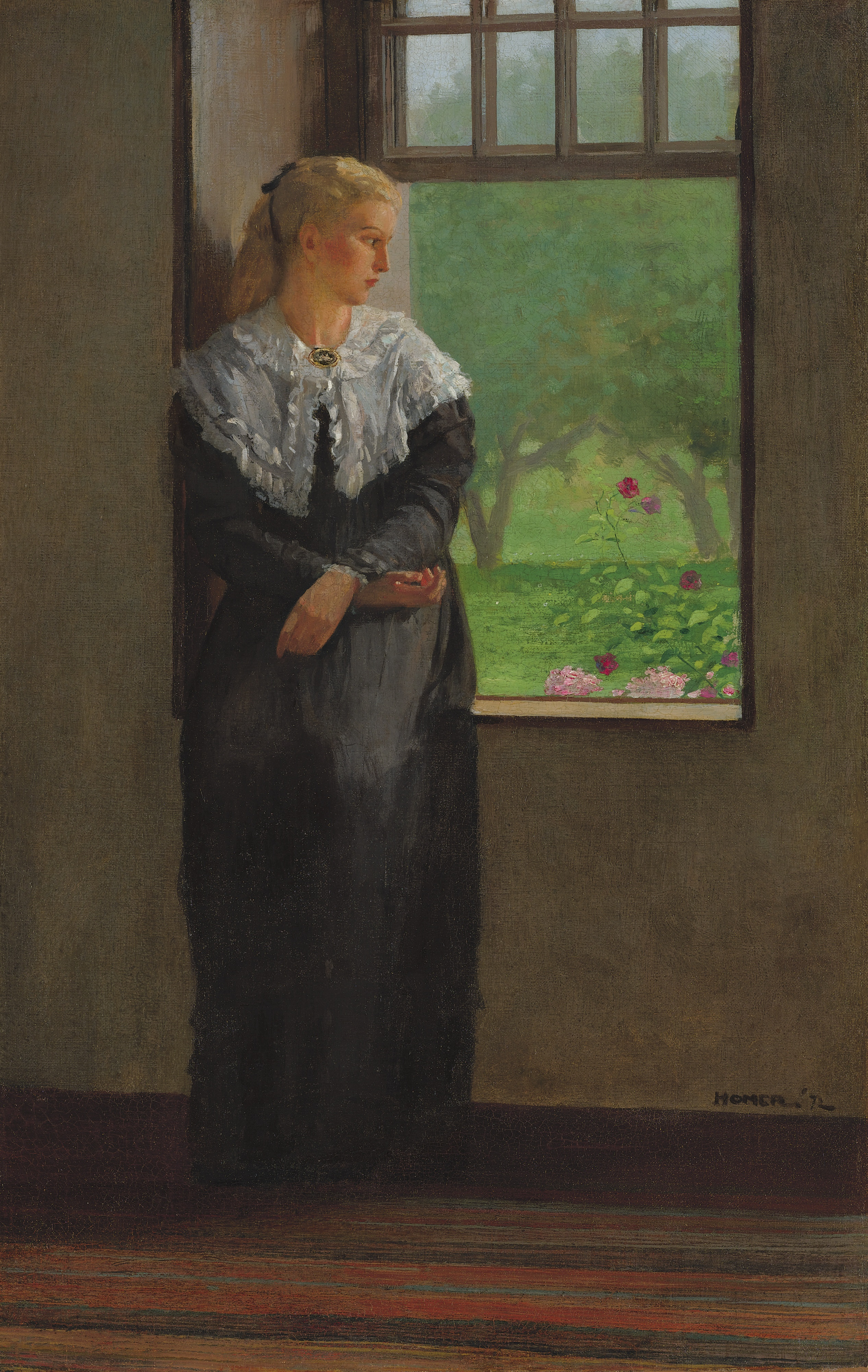
Reverie, Winslow Homer

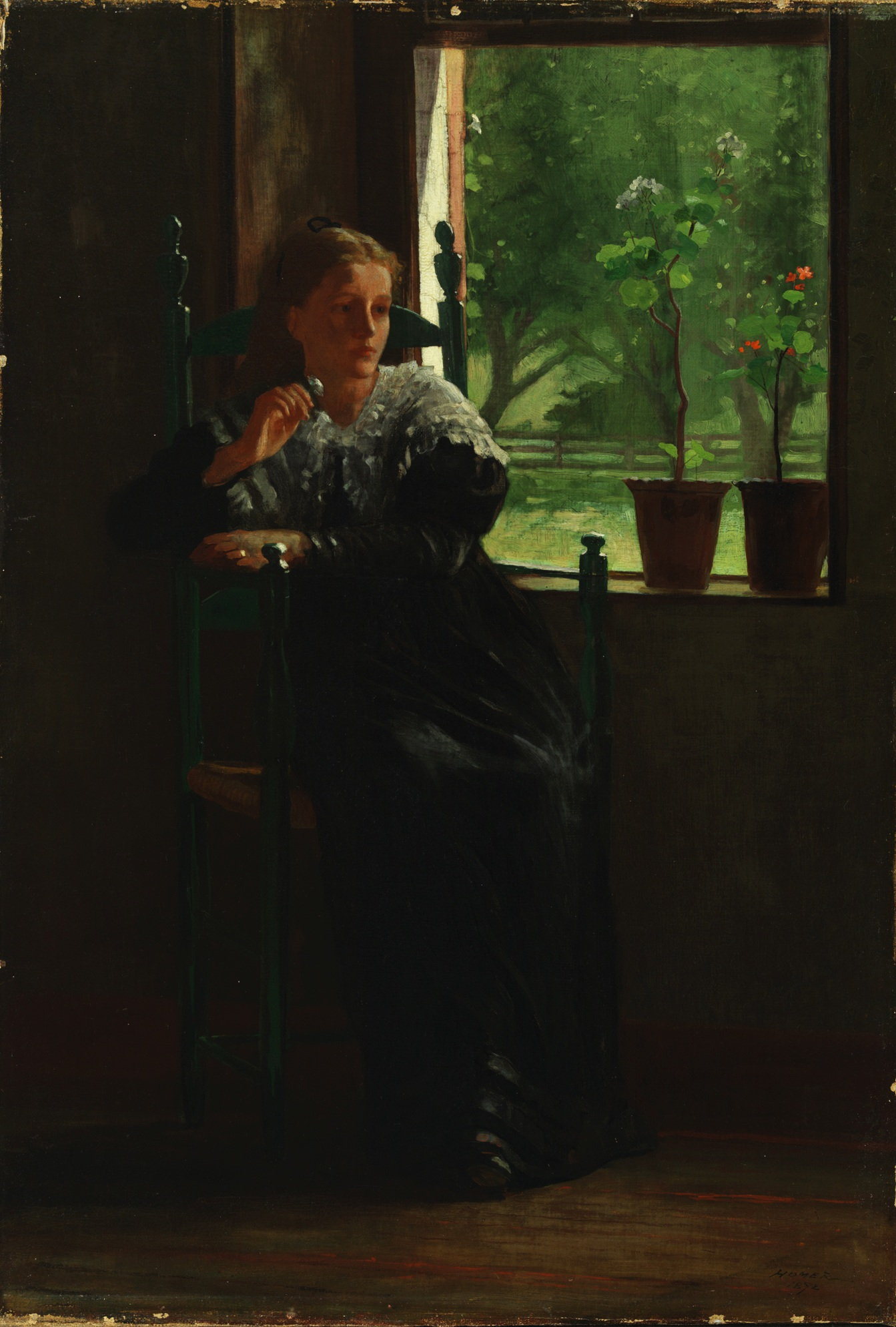
At The Window, Winslow Homer

== Reception ==
=== Press ===
Grace Hoops was discussed by several critics. One author praised it as a "spirited picture." Another writer ridiculed it in the New York Daily Tribune: "Mr. Winslow Homer had a picture entirely unworthy of his reputation. It was called 'Grace Hoops,' but why, who can tell. These ladies had no hoops, and certainly they had no grace."

=== Sales and exhibitions ===
The painting is currently in the collection of the McMullen Museum of Art, having been donated as part of the Carolyn A. and Peter S. Lynch collection. It was first owned by a certain Henry T. Chapman before being sold at Leavitt's auction house to Lawson Valentine in May 1875.

Grace Hoops has also been exhibited on several occasions since its creation in the 19th century. It has been displayed at Young's Art Galleries in Chicago, Illinois; the Museum of Fine Arts, Boston in 1944; the San Francisco Legion of Honor in 1964; and the Whitney Museum of American Art in 1973.

== See also ==
- List of paintings by Winslow Homer
