= McMullen Museum of Art =

Museum in Chestnut Hill, Massachusetts

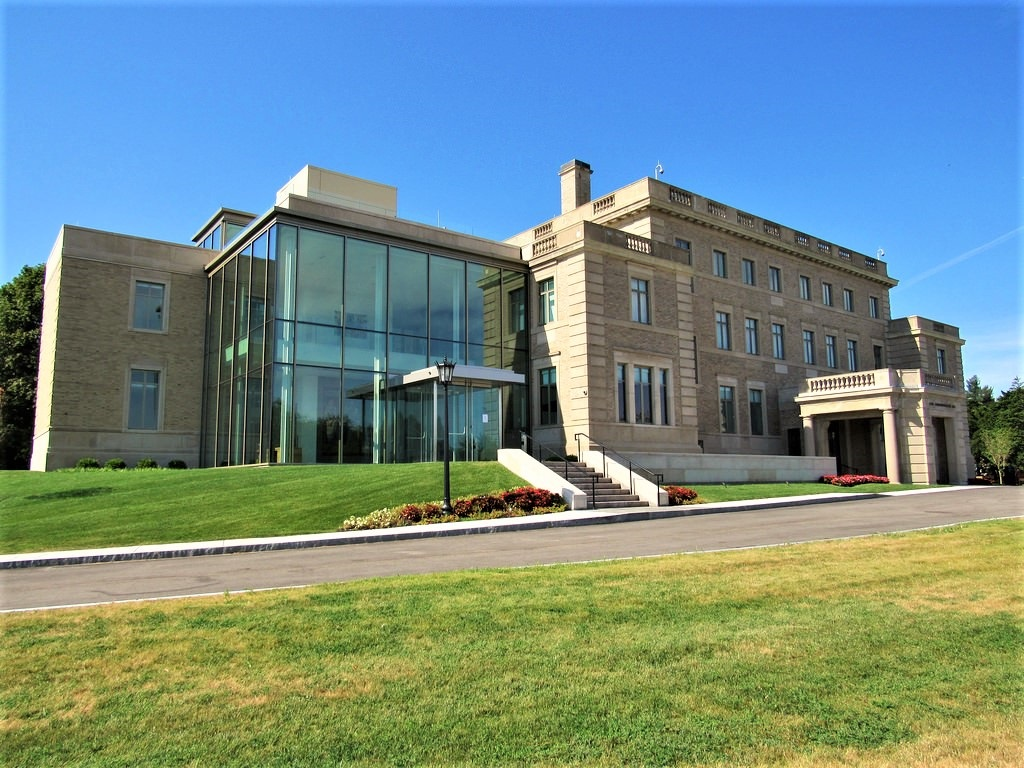
- Established: 1993
- Location: 2101 Commonwealth Avenue, Boston, Massachusetts, US
- Coordinates: 42.3352°N 71.1696°W
- Type: Art museum
- Director: Nancy Netzer
- Website: mcmullenmuseum.bc.edu

McMullen Museum of Art is the university art museum of Boston College in Brighton, Massachusetts, near the main campus in Chestnut Hill.

== History ==
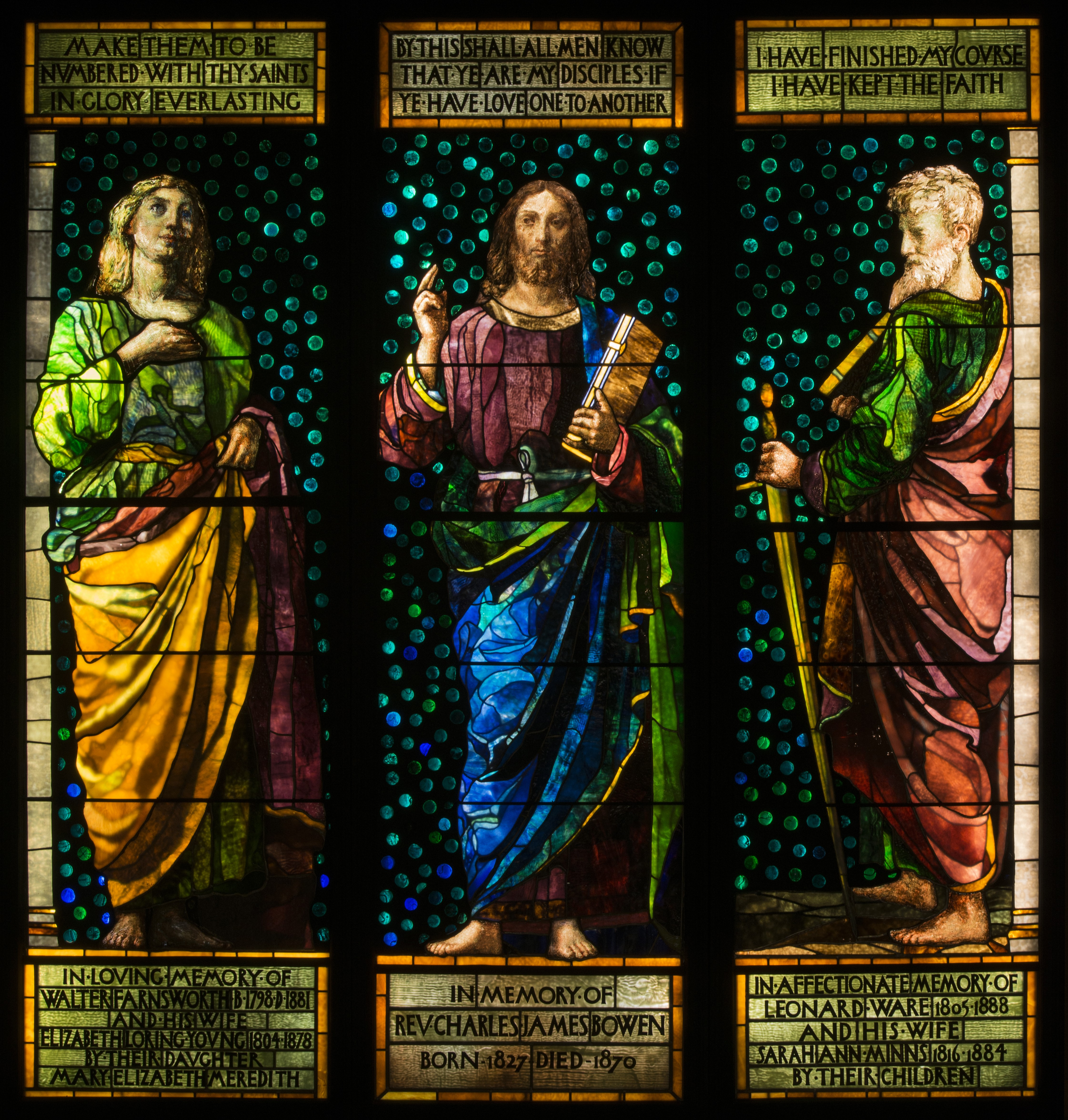
John La Farge, Christ between the Apostles John and Paul (Christ Preaching), McMullen Museum of Art.

The museum, which opened in Devlin Hall in 1993, was officially named The Charles S. and Isabella V. McMullen Museum of Art in 1996 in honor of the parents of the Boston College benefactor, trustee, and art collector John J. McMullen.

In September 2016, the museum relocated to 2101 Commonwealth Avenue on Boston College's Brighton Campus. The new facility features nearly two times the exhibition space of its previous location in Devlin Hall, state-of-the art lighting, movable walls, humidity and climate control, and extensive storage for the museum's growing permanent collection.

Despite being a university art museum residing on a college campus, the McMullen Museum of Art organizes multidisciplinary exhibitions that have received national and international recognition. Stephen Kinzer of the New York Times has written that it is in the vanguard of museums creating exhibitions that "reach far beyond traditional art history", providing political, historical, and cultural context for works on view.

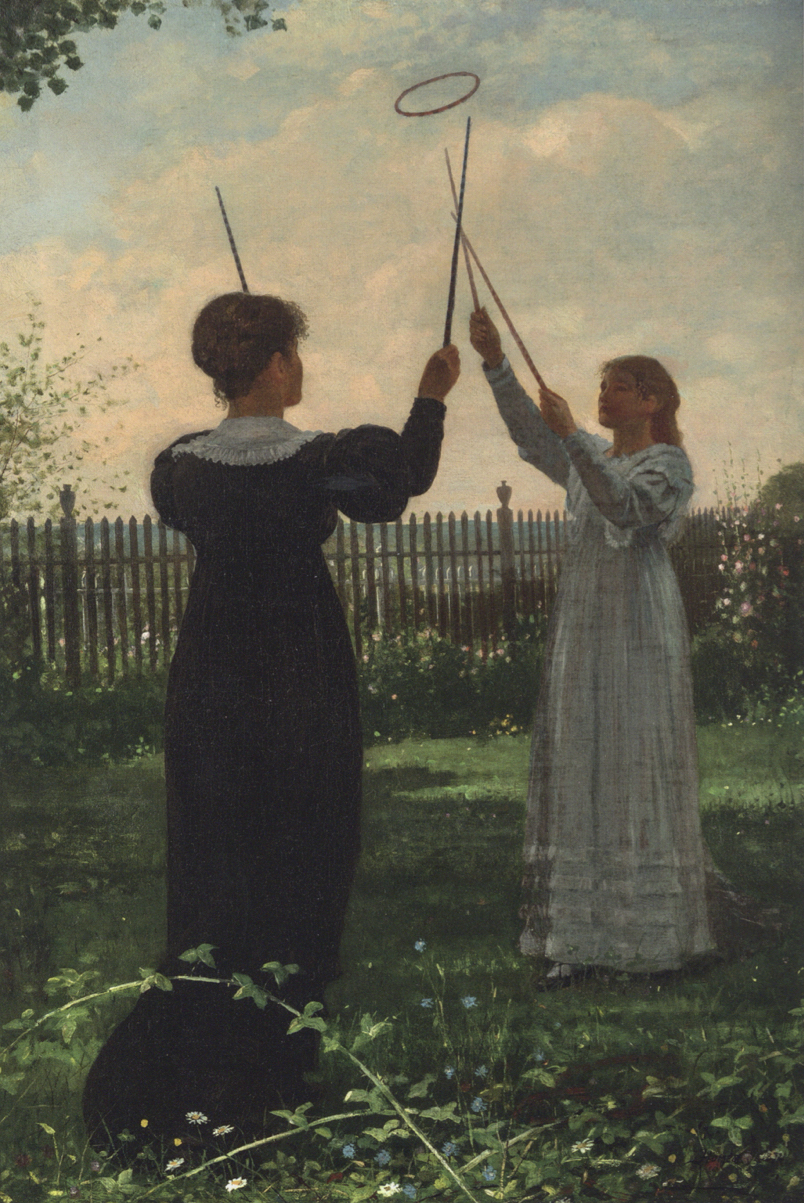
Winslow Homer, Grace Hoops, part of the Lynch Collection at the McMullen Museum of Art.

The Museum holds an extensive permanent collection that spans the history of art from Europe, Asia, Americas, and has significant representation of Gothic and Baroque tapestries, Italian paintings of the 16th and 17th centuries, and American paintings of the 19th and early 20th centuries. Well-known artists represented in the museum include Amedeo Modigliani, Frank Stella, Françoise Gilot, Alexander Ney, and John La Farge.

In 2021, the investor and philanthropist Peter Lynch donated 27 paintings and drawings to the museum, including works by Winslow Homer, Mary Cassatt, John Singer Sargent, and Pablo Picasso. Lynch also committed $5 million to support the curation of the works, which will become the museum's Carolyn A. and Peter S. Lynch Collection.

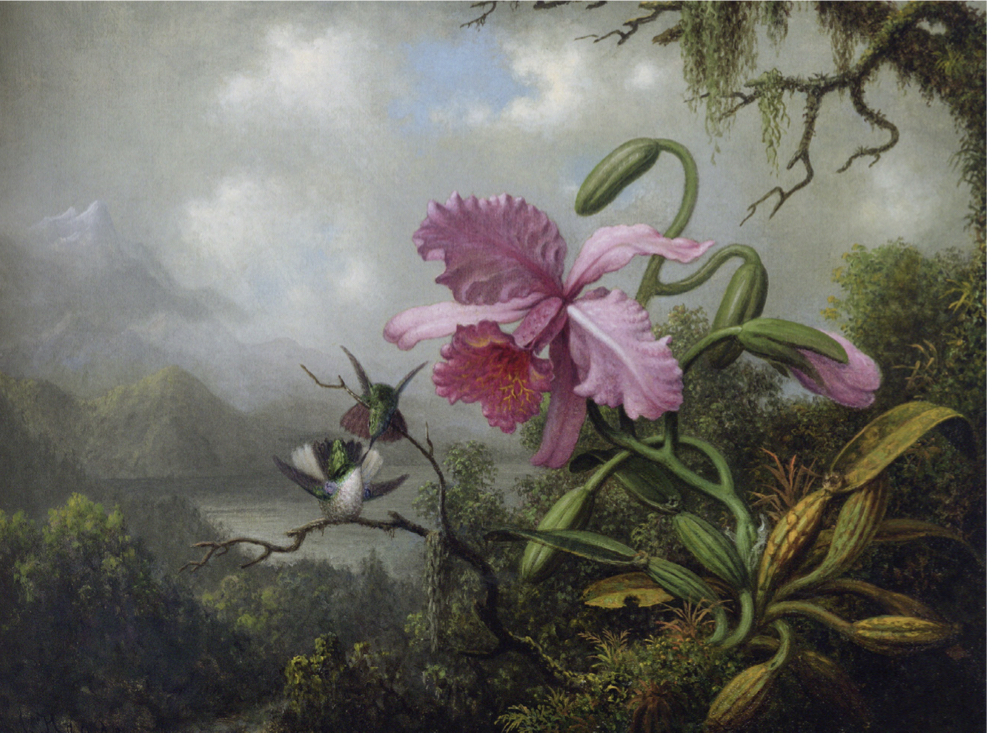
Martin Johnson Heade, Orchid and Hummingbirds near a Mountain Lake, part of the Lynch Collection at the McMullen Museum of Art.

== Exhibitions ==
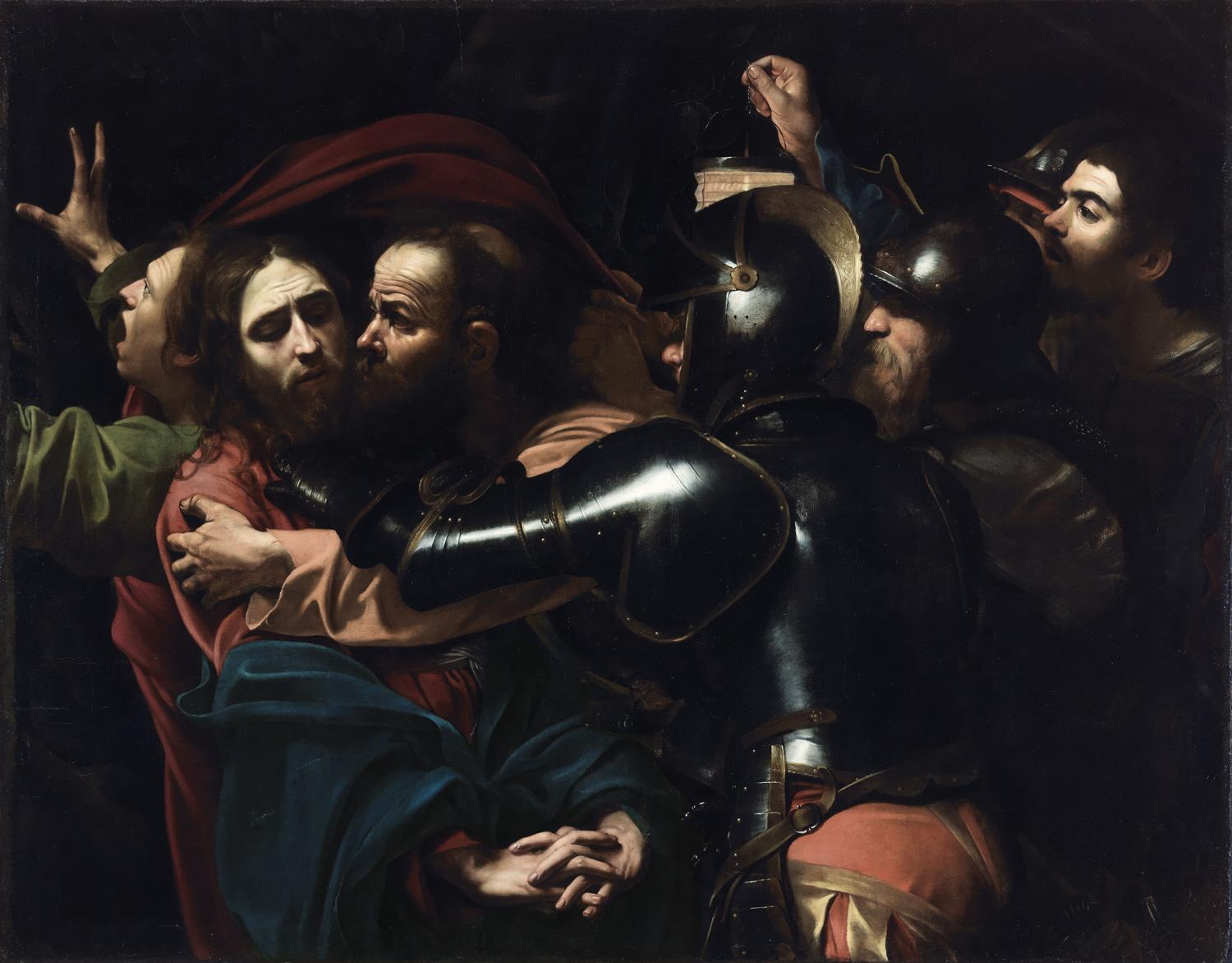
The Taking of Christ (1602) from the collections of the National Gallery of Ireland, Dublin, was a major draw at the McMullen Museum's 1999 exhibition "Saints and Sinners".

The McMullen Museum has hosted more than sixty exhibitions over two decades. They have been curated by both internal teams of scholars from the Boston College and international specialists. Being a university museum, the focus of the exhibitions is the generation of new knowledge in all disciplinary fields of art history.

Recent significant exhibitions include:

- "Carrie Mae Weems: Strategies of Engagement" (2018)
- "Cao Jun: Hymns to Nature" (2018), curated by the American philosopher John Sallis. It was the first exhibition of Cao Jun's work in the United States.
- "Beyond Words: Illuminated Manuscripts in Boston Collections" (2016)
- "Portugal, Jesuits, and Japan: Spiritual Beliefs and Earthly Goods" (2013). The exhibit focused on nearly a century of interaction, beginning in 1543, between the Japanese people and the Portuguese, namely traders and Jesuit missionaries. .
- "Paul Klee: Philosophical Vision; From Nature to Art", with which the McMullen Museum of Art reopen for its fall 2012 season;
- "Pollock Matters" (2007) received much media attention, comprising over 150 paintings, drawings, photographs, and sculptures, exploring the personal and artistic relationship between famed American Abstract Expressionist painter Jackson Pollock and noted Swiss-born photographer and graphic designer Herbert Matter;
- A retrospective of the work of Surrealist Roberto Matta (2004), organized by university faculty from the romance languages, art history, and theology departments, was also well received;
- "Edvard Munch: Psyche, Symbol, and Expression" (2001) was the largest American exhibition of Munch's work since 1978;
- "Saints and Sinners: Caravaggio and the Baroque Image" (1999), featuring as its centerpiece the first North American appearance of the then-recently rediscovered masterpiece by Italian Baroque artist Caravaggio, The Taking of Christ. This exhibition, by any reckoning, has outshone by far all other McMullen exhibitions, previous and subsequent, both in terms of the amount of international media attention and attendance numbers it received. It effectively first put the McMullen Museum "on the map."
