= Orchid and Hummingbirds near a Mountain Lake =

Painting by Martin Johnson Heade

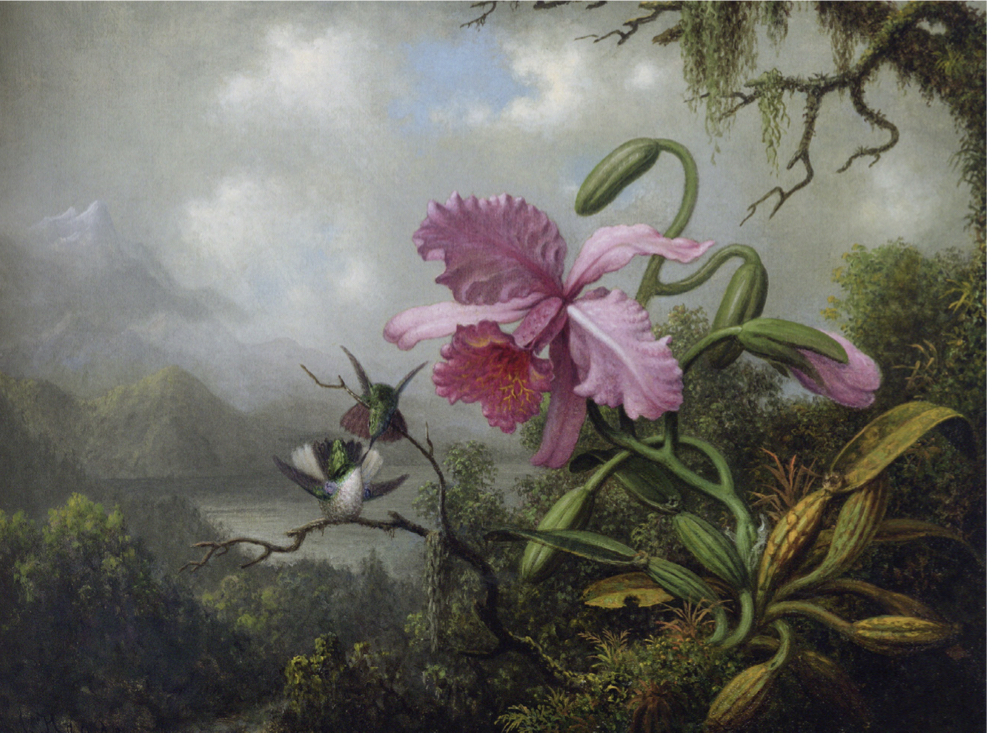
- Artist: Martin Johnson Heade
- Year: c. 1875–1890
- Medium: oil on canvas
- Dimensions: 15.2 cm × 20.5 cm (6.0 in × 8.1 in)
- Location: McMullen Museum of Art; Boston

Orchid and Hummingbirds near a Mountain Lake is a painting by Martin Johnson Heade, which he completed sometime between 1875 and 1890. Some scholars see the sensual depiction of the orchid and the nearly touching beaks of the birds as conveying romantic or even sexual overtones. Others see Heade's interest in orchids and hummingbirds as an exploration of dominance and survival in nature, perhaps inspired by Charles Darwin's evolutionary theory. The work is now in the collection of the McMullen Museum of Art at Boston College, having been donated as part of the Carolyn A. and Peter S. Lynch collection.

Works such as this earned Heade critical and commercial success during his lifetime. His reputation grew substantially during the second half of the twentieth century, and the curator Theodore E. Stebbins, Jr. remarked in 1992 that "Heade has been recognized during the last fifty years as one of the most original and most talented of all American artists."

== Background ==
=== Heade's South America ===
Heade began his study on hummingbirds during an expedition to South America, specifically Brazil, in 1863. He made two more trips to South America after that, with the third and final trip being in 1869–70. In South America, Heade spent his time studying the environment and sketching what he saw in its lively and natural form.

=== Hummingbirds in art ===
Heade was the first artist to paint live hummingbirds in their natural environment as opposed to dead hummingbirds in a studio setting. According to Stebbins, "during the early 1870s Heade moved from conventional still-life compositions, in which he would typically paint a vase of flowers resting on a table indoors, to a highly unusual format–hardly a 'still-life' at all–where he would depict orchids and hummingbirds as they existed in the tropical wilderness." Before these paintings, Heade mostly painted marshes and coastlines. The landscape element of his paintings of hummingbirds is often overlooked. Even though the landscape is not the focal point, it still takes up a majority of the painting. Heade was known to be fond of hummingbirds, even feeding his own hummingbirds sugar water.

While Heade pioneered the portrayal of hummingbirds in art during his trip to South America, writers such as Mabel Loomis Todd and Emily Dickinson depicted them in their work as well. Hummingbirds are classically symbolic of American identity and exemplary of European fasciation with the exotic wildlife in the Americas. A mutual love for the exoticism of hummingbirds also fostered a relationship between Heade and Pedro II of Brazil.

Heade has painted over 100 depictions of hummingbirds in their tropical abodes. Heade's depictions of these exotic birds are small, "measuring only about twenty inches on their longest edge," giving the work a feeling of intimacy. The paintings lack negative space, instead depicting the surrounding landscape in minute detail.

=== Orchids in art ===
Many scholars believe that the orchid depicted in Heade's art is symbolic of women and sexuality because of how intensely it was painted. The orchid has roots in sensual symbolism, as the word orchid is derived from the Greek word for testicles, "orchis." This symbolism of the orchid is corroborated because, according to art historian Barbara Novak, "the flowers themselves are suggestively configured and painted with a variety of stroking and touches." Since Heade was not married until later in his life, it is possible, according to scholars, that the orchid is used to symbolize the sublimation of his own sexual desires.

The orchid in the scope of Heade's works could also be symbolic of the struggle of survival in the wild. According to Timothy A. Eaton, as Darwin's ideas were becoming more popular at the time, "the orchid was held up as an example of his theory’s validity because of its remarkable diversity attributed to the need for adaptation in the struggle for survival." The orchid and hummingbird are similar in their depiction as an exotic piece of nature with complex anatomy, so the Orchid and Hummingbird Near a Mountain Lake could be pinning the two against one another in a fight.

== Painting ==
=== Heade's technique ===
Heade typically forwent preparatory sketches in favor of painting directly onto his canvas. Heade employed many motifs in his paintings, two of them being hummingbirds and orchids. Once he perfected the craft of painting each motif, he tended to add them into many of his paintings, which is one of the reasons why he has so many paintings including orchids and hummingbirds. Heade tended to begin with a tentative background before adding in the finer details of each painting. Heade also used a variety of colors as they became available, as well as an array of glazing techniques to add light to his paintings. Heade's hummingbirds are executed with a level of detail similar to Pre-Raphaelite paintings.

== Comparison ==
=== Comparison to Church ===
Heade was greatly influenced by artists in the 10th Street Studio in New York City. One of these artists was Frederic Edwin Church. Church was considered to be one of the greatest painters in America, and Heade greatly admired Church's landscape paintings, especially Niagara. Many of Heade's paintings appear to be influenced by the landscapes of Church, most notably with Heade's Study of an Orchid, which has waterfalls and a cliff, two features common to Church's paintings.

== Display ==
Orchid and Hummingbirds on a Mountain Lake is not currently on view, but is in the collection of the McMullen Museum at Boston College as part of Peter S. Lynch's donation of 27 paintings and 3 drawings. Lynch and his wife Carolyn were fond of nature paintings, especially Orchid and Hummingbirds Near a Mountain Lake, which Stebbins referred to as one of the "masterpieces of the collection."
