= Metropolitan Museum of Art Schools =

Former MMA education programs

The Metropolitan Museum of Art Schools were a series of educational programs established by the Metropolitan Museum of Art to provide vocational training in the late 19th century.

== History ==
The Metropolitan Museum of Art embarked its first educational venture during the winter of 1879–1880 with the establishment of a school to provide vocational training in woodworking and metalworking. The first school was funded by a $50,000 contribution from Gideon F.T. Reed, former partner of Tiffany and Co., with organizational assistance from Edward Moore, a silversmith. Over the next 15 years the school's name was changed numerous times in part a reflection of changing ideas about education held by Metropolitan Museum Trustees. Among names used were Industrial Art Schools of the Metropolitan Museum of Art, Technical Art Schools of the Metropolitan Museum of Art, Metropolitan Museum Art Schools, and The Metropolitan Museum of Art Schools. The schools were supervised by a succession of managers under the direction of a Committee on Art Schools, which in turn reported to the Metropolitan's Board of Trustees. Managers included John Buckingham, John Ward Stimson, Arthur L. Tuckerman and Arthur Pennington.

The first location of these Schools was the third floor of 31 Union Square, on the northwest corner of Broadway and 16th Street. Free classes in woodwork and metalwork met twice weekly in the evening. In 1880, Richard T. Auchmuty, a proponent of trade schools, offered the Museum rent-free use of a building he had newly erected on 1st Avenue between 67th and 68th Streets. His only condition was that students should be charged a nominal tuition of $5 or $8 per semester, depending on whether they took day or evening classes. Prior to this classes had been free. At the 1st Avenue location, 143 students studied drawing and design, modeling and carving, carriage drafting, decoration in distemper and plumbing. The school soon relocated to the upper floors of the Glass Hall building, 214-216 East 34th Street, where it remained until 1887. At this location, elementary classes were added and the number of teachers was increased. The following year the school moved once again to 797-799 3rd Avenue.

John Ward Stimson, a former Museum superintendent who became the head of the Museum Schools, oversaw the development of the Schools from thirty to four hundred students in seventeen classes by 1888. At this point, two-thirds of the Schools' were women, and Stimson was adamant that the School had the potential to provide women with vocational training opportunities.

Despite significant contributions from Museum Trustees (including a $30,000 gift from Museum President Henry Gurdon Marquand) the school was financially challenged through much of its existence. In an 1889 cost-cutting move, the school relocated into the basement of the Museum building on 5th Avenue and 82nd Street. There the curriculum evolved to encompass the fine arts; course offerings included antique, life and still life painting, architecture, ornamental design, illustration and sculpture. In 1892 advance courses were instituted and prominent artist John La Farge was hired as instructor. In 1893, Frederick Ruckstull was appointed to teach modeling and marble carving, and the tuition was recorded as fifty dollars for a season ticket of day classes and thirty dollars for night classes.

Two years later, because of the increased expenses, all elementary courses were discontinued and the advanced painting class was cancelled right after. Museum Trustees ceased operation of the school program in spring 1895 and early in the 20th century the Trustees recommitted the Museum to a pedagogic mission by establishing an Education Department focused on a collections-based fine arts instruction.
