= Frances Sergeant Childs =

American historian (1901–1988)

- Born: April 17, 1901
- Died: June 11, 1988 (aged 87); Bridgeport, Connecticut
- Occupation: Historian
- Years active: 1928–1963
- Known for: Founding faculty member of Brooklyn College

Frances Sergeant Childs (April 17, 1901 – June 11, 1988) was an American historian who was a founding faculty member of Brooklyn College. Her area of specialization was Franco-American relations in the 18th and 19th centuries.

== Biography ==
Childs was born in New York City to Frances Aimee (La Farge) Childs and Edward Herrick Childs. Her maternal grandfather was the painter John La Farge. She attended Chapin School and then got her undergraduate degree from Bryn Mawr College (1923) and her master's (1927) and doctoral (1939) degrees from Columbia University.

Childs began her career in education as an instructor in history at Hunter College (1928–1930). In 1930, Childs was a founding faculty member of Brooklyn College, where she taught history for many years, beginning as an instructor and rising to full professor. As an historian, Childs specialized in Franco-American relations in the 18th and 19th centuries. Her major book is the much-cited survey French Refugee Life in the United States, 1790-1800: An American Chapter of the French Revolution (1940).

Childs retired in 1963 and died in Bridgeport, Connecticut.

== Books ==
- French Refugee Life in the United States, 1790-1800: An American Chapter of the French Revolution (1940)
- Fontaine Leval, a French Settlement on the Maine coast, 1791: A French Manuscript in the American Antiquarian Society in Worcester, Massachusetts, with an Introduction and Notes by Frances Sergeant Childs (1942)
- French Opinion of Anglo-American Relations: 1795-1805 (1948)
- Citizen Hauterive's "Questions on the United States" (1957)
- France in New York, 1795-1850 (1957)
