= Cao Jun (artist) =

Artist (b. 1966)

- 曹俊
- Born: 1966 (age 59–60); Jiangyan
- Education: Shandong University of Science & Technology (B.S.); Nanjing University of the Arts (Ph.D.)
- Known for: Artist

Cao Jun (Chinese: 曹俊, born 1966 in Jiangyan District, Jiangsu Province, China) is a Chinese artist living in the United States. He won the Gold Medal at the Salon du Carrousel du Louvre in Paris in 2013. In 2018 he exhibited his works at the McMullen Museum of Art, Boston, United States in a solo exhibition curated by the philosopher and professor Sallis John, together with the art historian Prof. Nancy Netzer. His works are a synthesis of Chinese classical calligraphy and western Modernism.

== Life ==
Cao Jun was born in 1966 in Jiangyan, Jiangsu Province, China. In 1989, he completed his bachelor's degree in mining engineering at Shandong University of Science & Technology, and in the following years increasingly devoted his life to art. In 1997, he won first place at the Shandong Chinese Fine Arts exhibition, organized by the China Artists Association. In 1999 his pictures were selected by the Chinese Artists Association for the national exhibition "Flower & Bird Painting". The China Central Academy of Fine Arts in Beijing awarded him a certificate of excellence in 2001 for his talent in calligraphy. In 2002 he emigrated to New Zealand and founded a gallery in Auckland and his own museum in Wuxi, China.

Many of his expressive works have been published in art magazines, periodicals and books, and are among the collections of contemporary art in museums worldwide. such as the National Art Museum of China, the Center Pompidour, the Parliament of New Zealand and the Rangitoto College. In 2012, he received a doctorate from Nanjing University of the Arts in China. His works went around the world in 2012, cured by the International Olympic Committée. On October 24, 2014, Cao Jun's "Space of Seeking Dream" was sent to the moon in an unmanned Chang'e-5 spacecraft. The purpose of Jun's painting was to test the functions of the probe. In 2017 he collaborated with Steven Rockefeller Jr. to create the installation “breath of earth”, in which the surging waves near the Bahamas - photographed by Steven keep - laps against the majestic mountains drawn by Cao Jun. In 2018, Cao Jun exhibited his works at The McMullen Museum of Art at Boston College as part of his first American retrospective, Cao Jun: Hymns to Nature. His oeuvre was presented by the philosopher and curator Prof. John Sallis and the art historian and director of the McMullen Museum of Art Prof. Nancy Netzer. Cao Jun is co-chairman of the Overseas Chinese Artists Association, President of the Chinese Painting Society in New York, and a Distinguished Professor at the Renmin University of China. Currently the artist lives in the United States.

== Work ==
Cao Jun began early on in his life to paint traditional calligraphies with ink and watercolors. During his stay abroad - first in New Zealand and then in the US - he came in contact with Western modernism, which essentially changed his own style. From this period on, Cao Jun started to work on warm-toned -often red and orange- calligraphies with abstracting -often blue or black- watercolor surfaces, stylistic juxtaposing the abstract-cold-modern west and the figurative-hot-traditional east.

Thematically, the artist indicates through his colourful surfaces the spiritual presence of the figurative nature, for example illustrating how their existence depends on the flow of time. In this sense, the musical comparison often cited by the artist is essential for the understanding of his oeuvre: just as music expresses the ubiquitous presence of time with physical instruments through its rhythms and sounds, so the works of Cao Jun show with colors and shapes, through the watercolor or oil, the invisible essence of the physical world. This concept is so relevant in his work that Cao Jun has later transformed these abstract surfaces into large-scale independent works. With colors in liquid oil, which he guides in a way inspired by ancient calligraphy, the artist creates currents on the canvas. Then these paintings inspired by nature are often enriched with shining gold dust, through which the composition enters in a dynamic dialog with the room around it. The result reminds of visions of the Cosmos, submarine landscapes or bird's eye views.

== Selected exhibitions ==
- Cao Jun: Hymns to Nature, McMullen Museum of Art, Boston, United States, 2018
- Art & Antique Residenz Salzburg (March and August), Schütz Fine Art-Chinese Department, Salzburg, Austria, 2018
- Art & Antique Hofburg Wien, Schütz Fine Art-Chinese Department, Vienna, Austria, 2018
- Art & Antique Residenz Salzburg (March and August), Schütz Fine Art-Chinese Department, Salzburg, Austria, 2017
- Art & Antique Hofburg Wien, Schütz Fine Art-Chinese Department, Vienna, Austria, 2017
- Art Salzburg, Salzburg, Austria, Schütz Fine Art-Chinese Department, 2016
- Art & Antique Residenz Salzburg, Schütz Fine Art-Chinese Department, Salzburg, Austria, 2016
- Solon du Carrousel du Louvre, Paris, France, 2013
- Personale, Zibo, Shandong, China, 2013
- Personale, Cao Jun Art Museum, Wuxi, China, 2011
- Century Development Inspiring Painting, The National Art Museum of China, Beijing, China, 2011
- Personale, Cao Jun Art Exhibition, Jiangsu Provincial Art Museum, Nanjing, China, 2010
- Personale, Cao Jun Art Exhibition, Yangzhou Art Museum Grand Opening, Yangzhou, China, 2010
- Personale, Cao Jun Art Exhibition-Where New Zealand Meets China, National Art Museum of China, Beijing, China, 2009
- Personale alla Cao Jun Art Gallery, Yangzhou, China, 2009
- Personale alla Cao Jun Art Centre, Zibo, Shandong, China, 2009
- Cao Jun Art Exhibition in Henglu Art Museum, Hangzhou, Zhejiang, China, 2006

== Selected awards and honors ==
- Six Star Diamond Award, Six Star Diamond Awards Ceremony, New York City, United States, 2018
- Gold Medal at the Salon du Carrousel du Louvre in Paris, France, 2013

== Selected artworks ==
- Turning Around the Universe, mixed media on canvas, 125 x 151 cm, sign. bottom right, 2016. Schütz Fine Art - Chinese Department, Vienna, Austria
- Opening and closing, mixed media on canvas, 213 x 137 cm, sign. bottom left, 2016. Schütz Fine Art - Chinese Department, Vienna, Austria
- The Noble Mystery, mixed media on canvas, 137 x 105 cm, 2015. Schütz Fine Art - Chinese Department, Vienna, Austria
- Colorful Time, mixed media on canvas, 107 x 159 cm, sign. bottom left, 2012. Schütz Fine Art - Chinese Department, Vienna, Austria
- Lotus, ink and color / golden painted paper (mounted), 41 x 41 cm, 2012
- National Spirit, ink and watercolor on paper, 205 x 144 cm, stamp, 1999

== Bibliography ==
- Sallis John (2018). Hymns to Nature. McMullen Museum of Art, Boston College, Boston

== See also ==
- Chinese callography
- Chinese Art
