= Christ between the Apostles John and Paul (Christ Preaching) =

Triptych by John La Farge

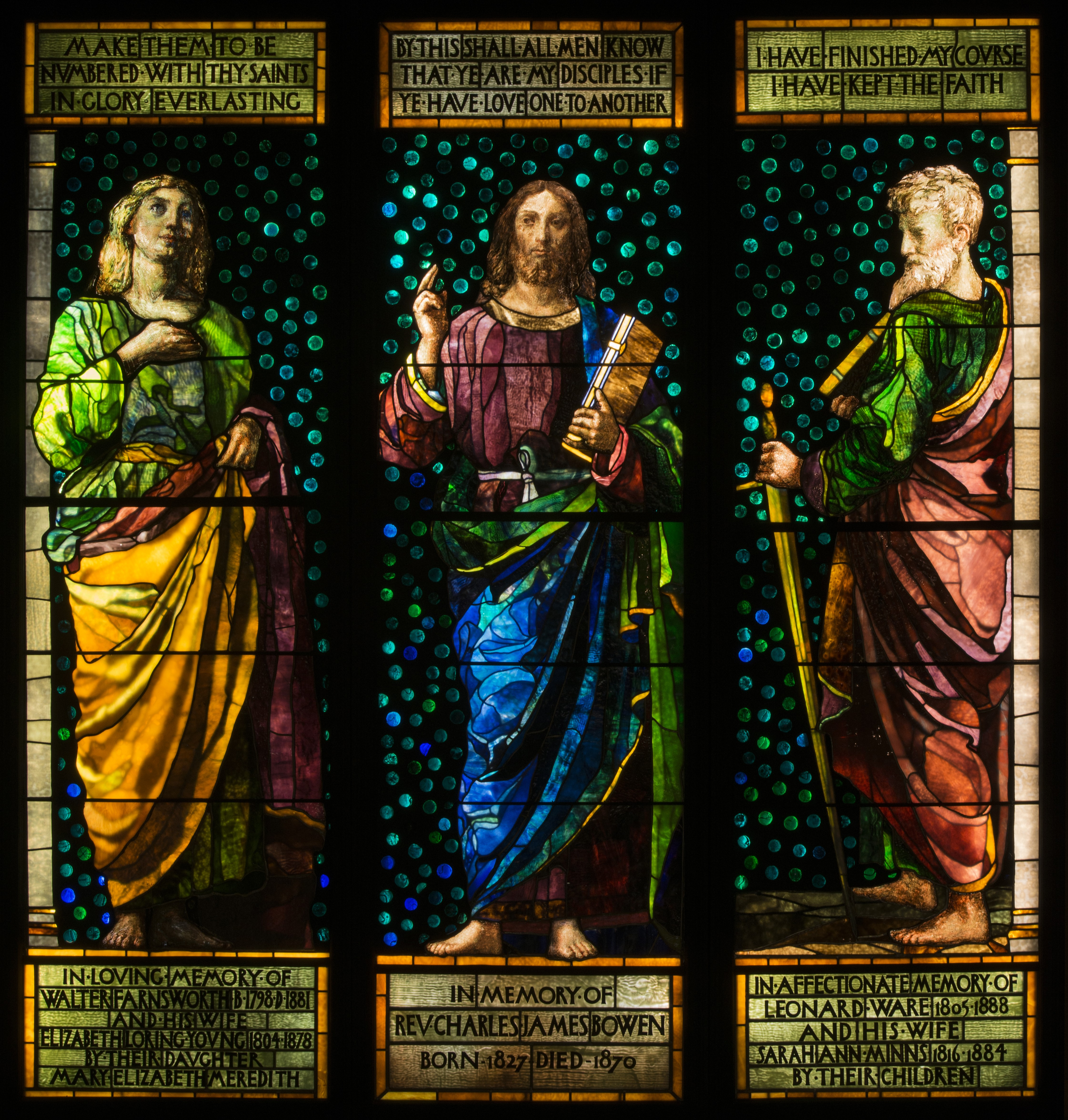
- Artist: John La Farge
- Year: 1889
- Location: McMullen Museum of Art

Christ between the Apostles John and Paul (Christ Preaching) is a stained glass triptych by the American artist John La Farge. The windows were originally created in 1889 for the All Souls Unitarian Church in Roxbury, Massachusetts (now the Charles Street African Methodist Episcopal Church). In 1925, they were transferred to the Unitarian Universalist Society of Amherst, Massachusetts, where they remained until 2013, when they were sold and subsequently donated to the McMullen Museum of Art at Boston College.
