= John La Farge =

American artist (1835–1910)

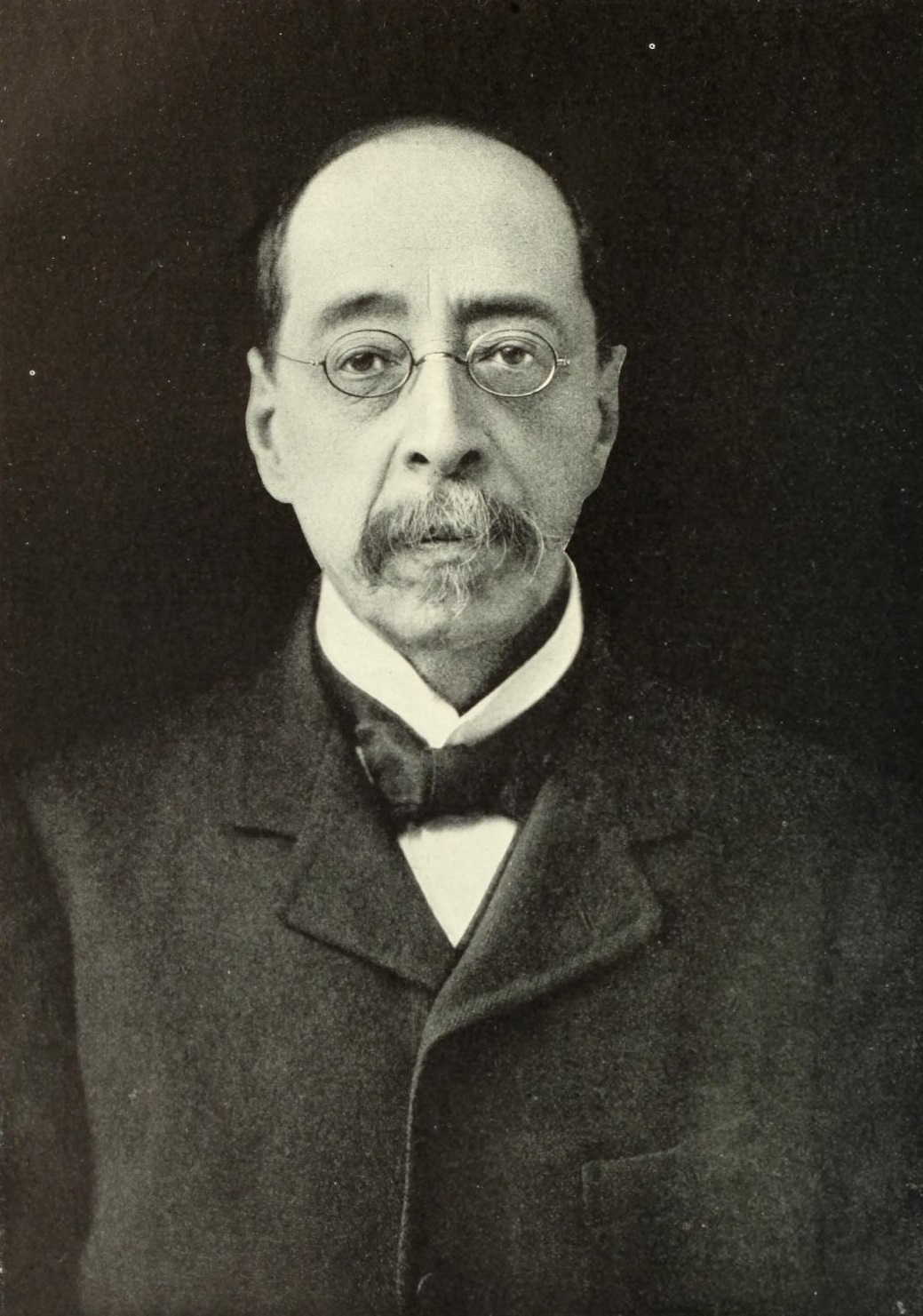
- John La Farge, 1902
- Born: March 31, 1835; New York City
- Died: November 14, 1910 (aged 75); Providence, Rhode Island
- Education: Mount St. Mary's University; Fordham University
- Occupations: Painter, stained glass artist, decorator, writer
- Spouse: Margaret Mason Perry (m. 1860)
- Children: 8, including Christopher, John

John La Farge (March 31, 1835 – November 14, 1910) was an American artist whose career spanned illustration, murals, interior design, painting, and popular books on his Asian travels and other art-related topics. La Farge made stained glass windows, mainly for churches on the American east coast, beginning with a large commission for Henry Hobson Richardson's Trinity Church in Boston in 1878, and continuing for thirty years. La Farge designed stained glass as an artist, as a specialist in color, and as a technical innovator, holding a patent granted in 1880 for superimposing panes of glass. That patent would be key in his dispute with contemporary and rival Louis Comfort Tiffany.

La Farge rented space in the Tenth Street Studio Building at its opening in 1858, and he became a longtime presence in Greenwich Village. In 1863 he was elected into the National Academy of Design; in 1877 he co-founded the Society of American Artists in frustration at the National Academy's conservatism. In 1892 La Farge was brought on as an instructor with the Metropolitan Museum of Art Schools to provide vocational training to students in New York City. He served as president of the National Society of Mural Painters from 1899 to 1904. In 1904, he was one of the first seven artists chosen for membership in the American Academy of Arts and Letters.

== Early life ==
La Farge was born in New York City to wealthy French parents, Jean Frédéric "John Frederick" La Farge and Louise Joséphine "Louisa" La Farge (née Binsse de Saint-Victor), and was raised bilingually. As a child, he and his brothers produced a handmade magazine in French entitled Le Chinois.

His interest in art began during his studies at Mount St. Mary's University in Maryland and St. John's College (now Fordham University) in New York. He studied law. His first visit to Paris in 1856 induced him to study painting with Thomas Couture, and become acquainted with an artistic and literary social circle. La Farge's earliest drawings and landscapes showed marked originality, especially in the handling of color values.

La Farge returned from Europe in October 1857, which ended his relationship with Couture. He returned to continue his law studies although, in his own words, at the same time "stealing as much time as I could for some of my new friends, the painters and architects." These included William James Stillman, George Henry Boughton, and members of the second generation of the Hudson River School. These circumstances changed with the death of his father in June 1858: the pressure to attend law school was gone, and there was a significant inheritance which gave him the freedom to take studio space in the newly created Tenth Street Studio Building at 51 West 10th Street in Greenwich Village. The building's communal spaces for artists set the conditions for social networking; its central atrium and traditional Saturday receptions were important in the careers of its tenants, and to the artistic reputation of the Village. Its architect Richard Morris Hunt recommended that La Farge study under his brother William Morris Hunt in Newport, Rhode Island. The artist Hunt was also a product of Couture's atelier.

== Career ==
Between 1859 and 1870, La Farge took up illustration, with Tennyson's Enoch Arden and Robert Browning's Men and Women, and worked on children's magazine illustrations with engraver Henry Marsh (American, 1826–1912).

In the 1870s, La Farge began to paint murals, which became popular for public buildings as well as churches. His first mural was painted in Trinity Church, Boston, in 1873. Then followed his decorations in the Church of the Ascension (the large altarpiece) and St. Paul's Chapel, New York. In his lunette mural Athens at Bowdoin College Museum of Art, a building designed by Charles Follen McKim, the model for the central figure was the African-American muse Hettie Anderson. (Anderson also owned one of his paintings of Samoa.) He also took private commission from wealthy patrons (e.g. Cornelius Vanderbilt) and was reputedly worth $150,000 at one point. La Farge continued to create murals through his career: for the Minnesota State Capitol at St. Paul, at age 71, he executed four great lunettes representing the history of law. Also among his final works were six murals on the theme of eminent lawgivers, beginning with Moses, for the Baltimore City Court House, now the Clarence M. Mitchell Jr. Courthouse.

During an 1880s renovation of the Samuel J. Tilden Mansion, now home to the National Arts Club, La Farge was one of several artisans hired by lead architect Calvert Vaux. He created stained glass panels for the interior of the mansion which remain today.

La Farge traveled extensively in Asia and the South Pacific, which inspired his painting. He visited Japan in 1886 in the company of Henry Adams in the aftermath of the suicide of Adams' wife; there, La Farge began a lifelong friendship with Kakuzō Okakura. Again in Adams's company, he visited the South Seas in 1890 and 1891, in particular spending time absorbing the culture of Samoa, Tahiti and Fiji. In Hawaii in September 1890 he painted scenic spots on Oahu and traveled to the Island of Hawaii to paint an active volcano. These travels are extensively recounted in his book Reminiscences of the South Seas, and in Adams' letters.

In 1863 he was elected into the National Academy of Design; in 1877 he co-founded the Society of American Artists in frustration at the National Academy's conservatism (although he retained his National Academy membership). In 1892 La Farge was brought on as an instructor with the Metropolitan Museum of Art Schools to provide vocational training to students in New York City. He served as president of the National Society of Mural Painters from 1899 to 1904. In 1904, he was one of the first seven artists chosen for membership in the American Academy of Arts and Letters. La Farge also received the Cross of the Legion of Honor from the French Government.

== Stained glass ==
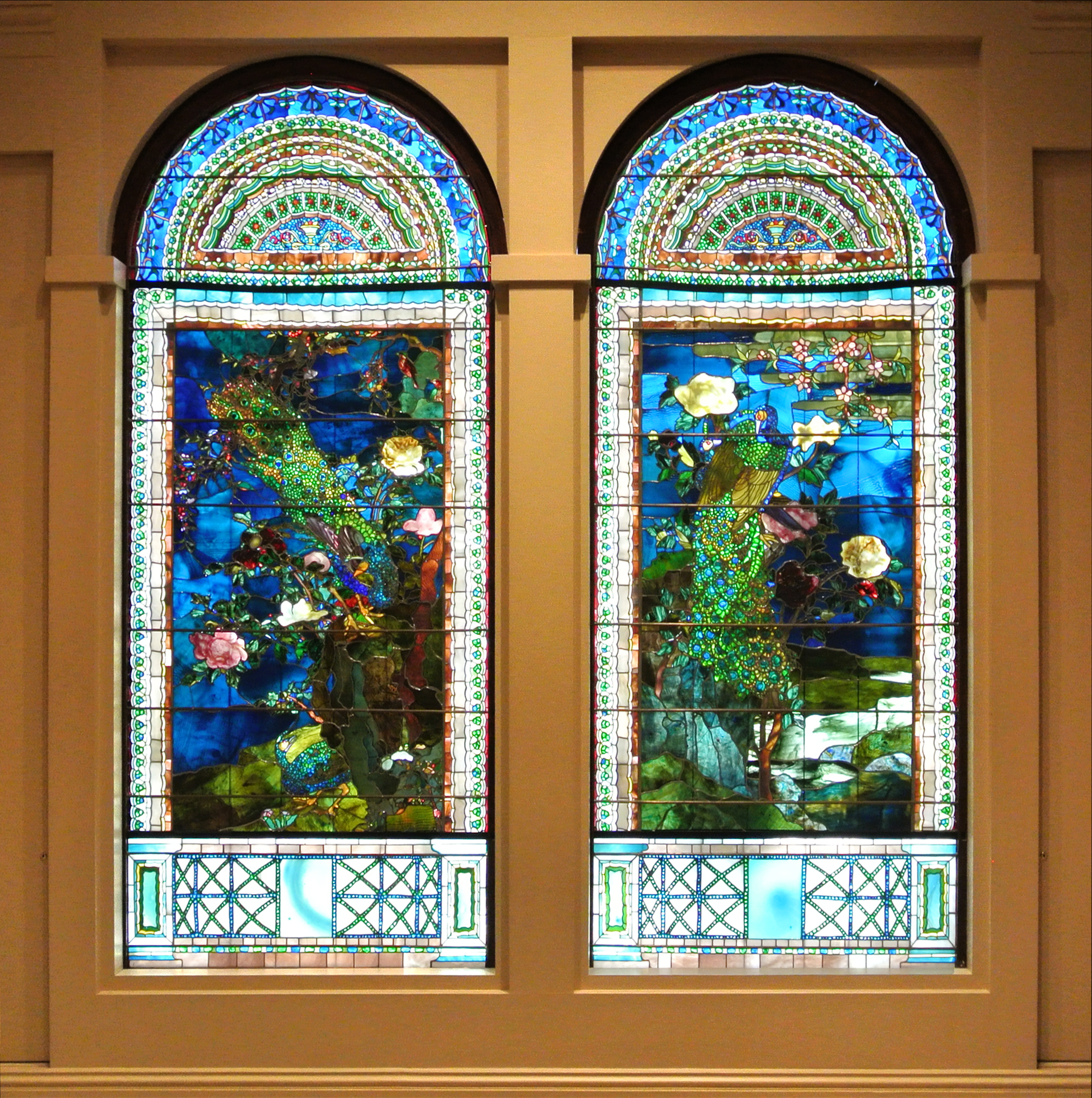
Peacocks and Peonies, 1882

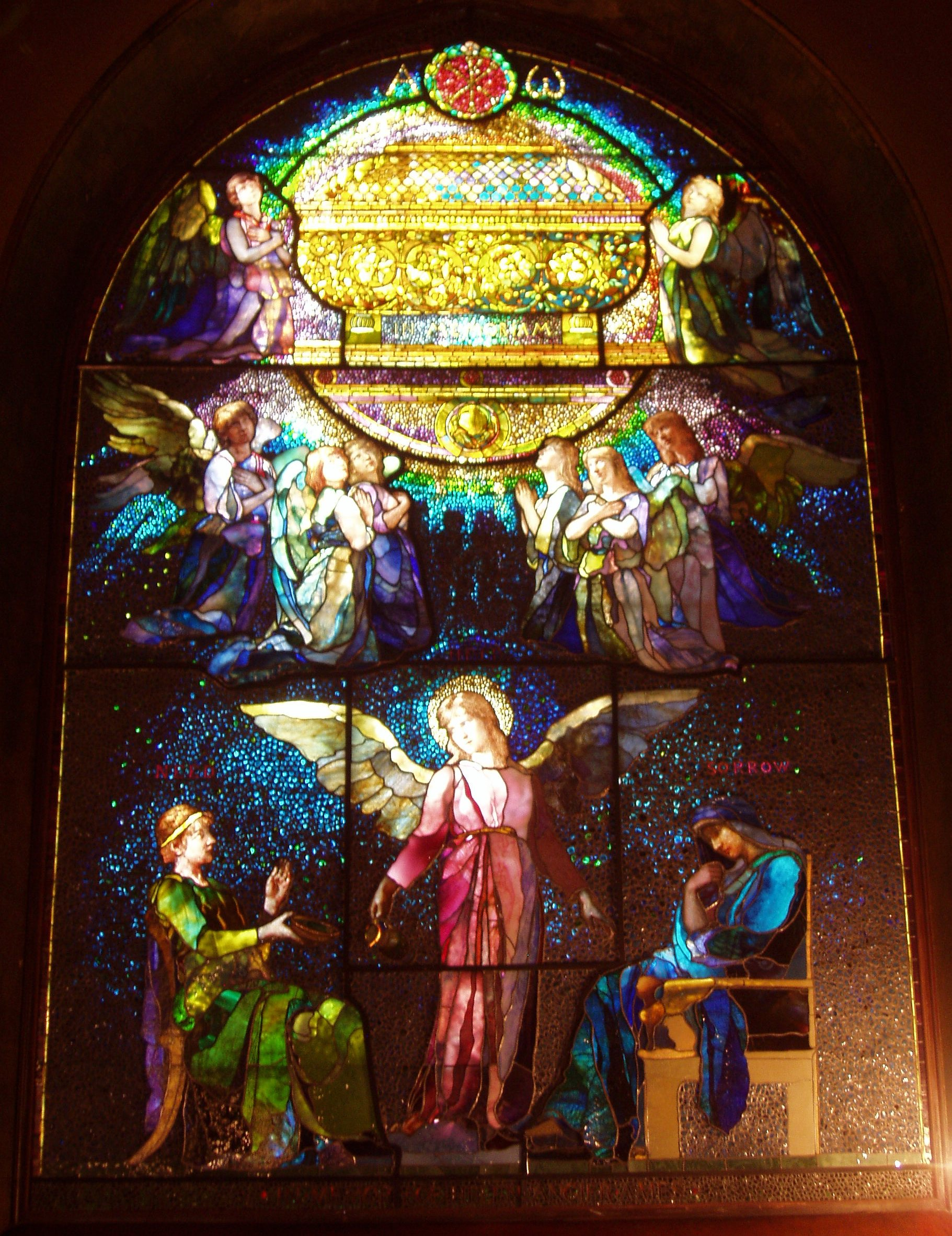
Angel of Help, 1886

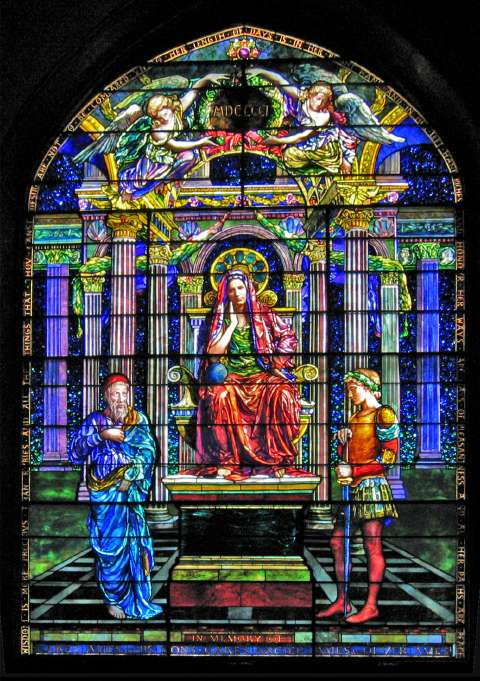
Figure of Wisdom, 1901

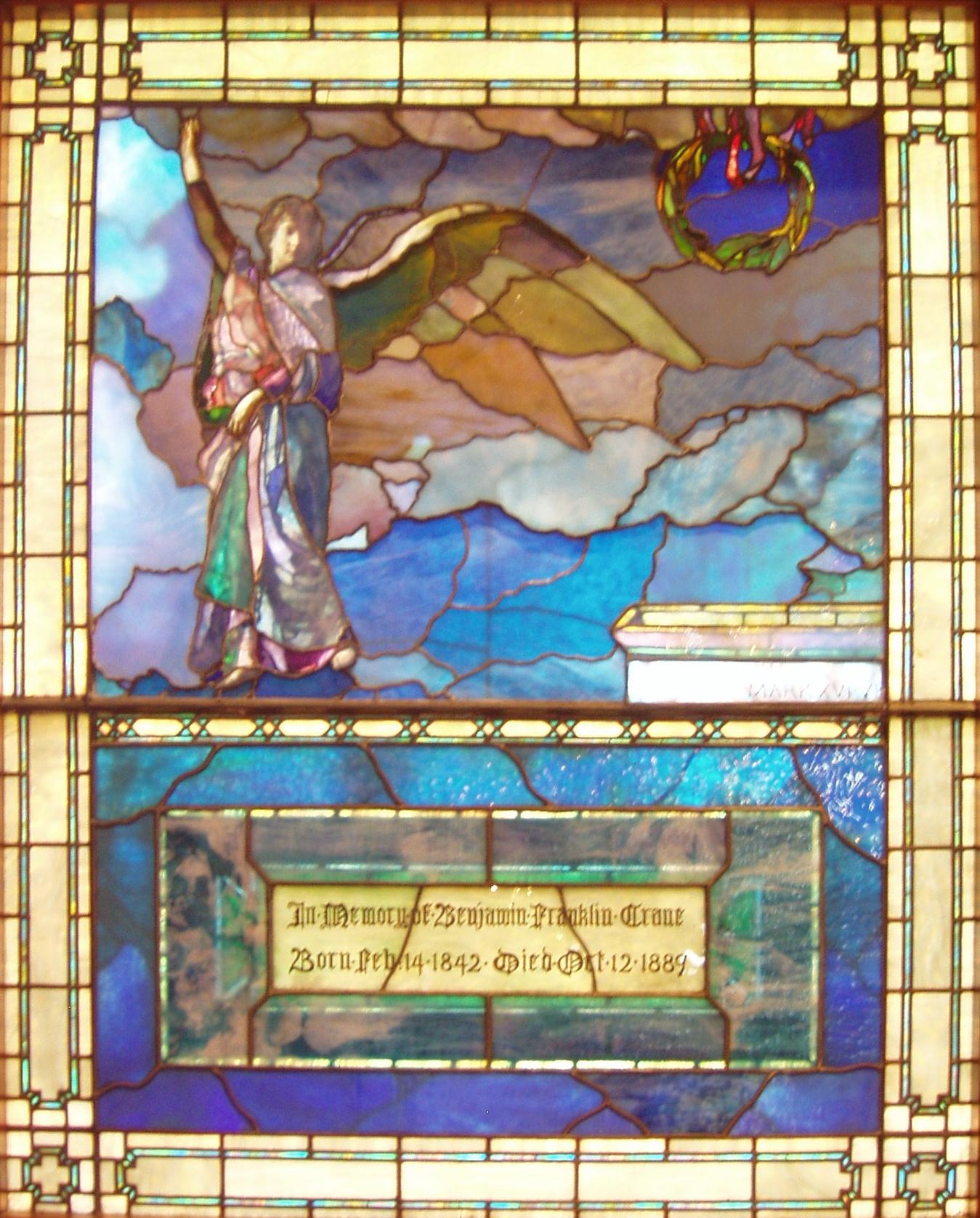
Angel at the Tomb, Thomas Crane Public Library

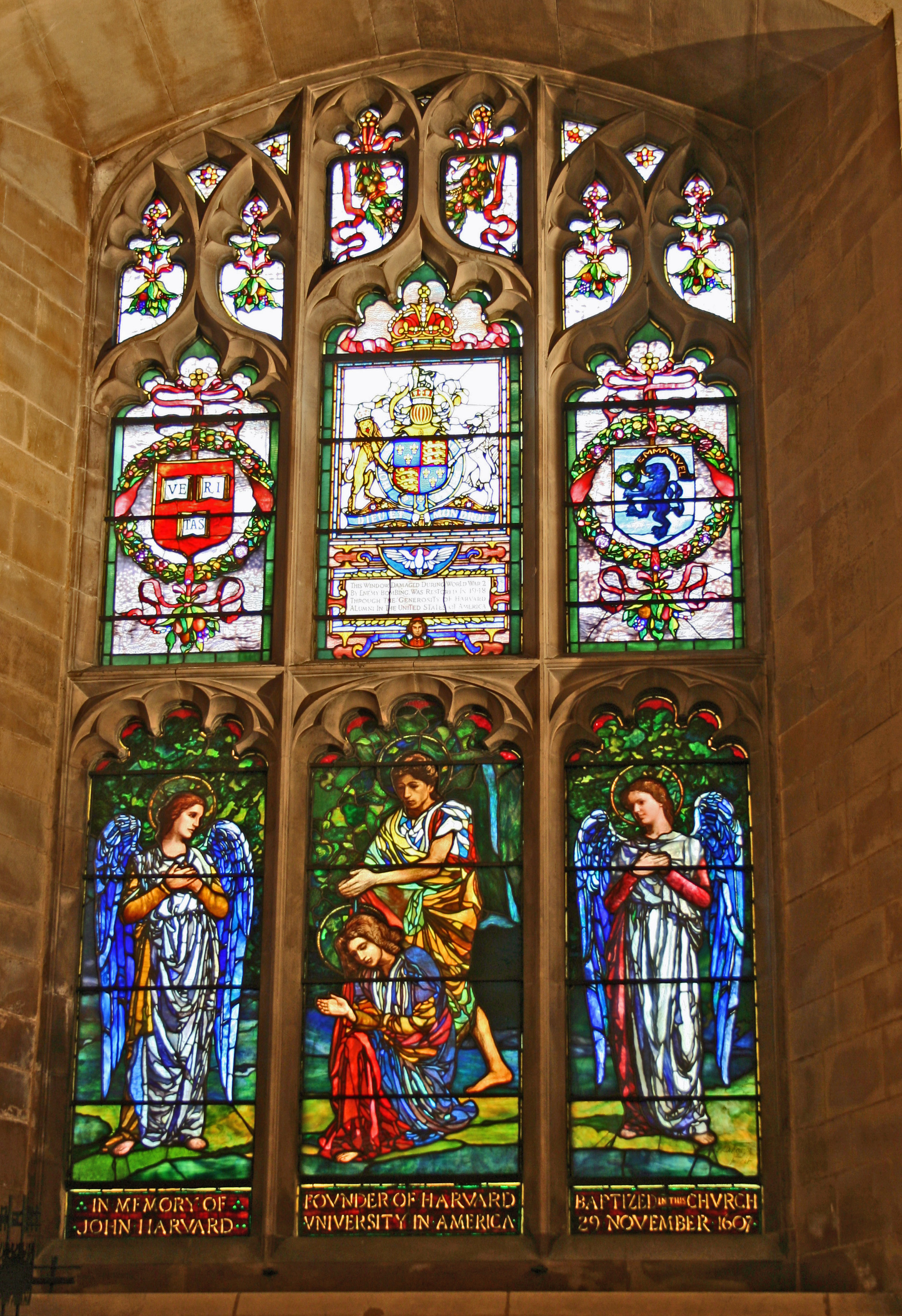
“John Harvard window”, Harvard Chapel, Southwark Cathedral, London, England

In 1875, La Farge began experimenting with problems of shifting and deteriorating color, especially in the medium of stained glass. At this time, stained glass had not yet been widely adopted as a medium in the United States, making his early efforts critical to its success. His work rivaled the beauty of medieval windows and added new resources by his use of opalescent glass and by his original methods of layering and welding the glass, which created a sense of three-dimensionality. Opalescent glass had been used for centuries in tableware, but it had never before been formed into flat sheets for use in stained-glass windows and other decorative objects. For his early endeavors, La Farge had had to custom-order flat sheets of opalescent glass from a Brooklyn glass manufacturer.

La Farge filed a patent application on Nov. 10, 1879, shortly after a newspaper account praised a recent window he made for Richard Derby of Long Island as "the first application of a new material [opalescent glass] to windows." He was granted patent no. 224,831 on February 24, 1880, for a "Colored-Glass Window", with technical details about manufacturing opalescent sheet glass and layering it to create windows.

=== Work ===
Among La Farge's many stained-glass works are windows at:

- Union Baptist Church of Baltimore (Baltimore) (1906)
- Trinity Church, Boston (1877–78)
- Biltmore Estate in Asheville, North Carolina (1881)
- Samuel J. Tilden House, NYC (1881; building converted into the National Arts Club in 1906)
- Thomas Crane Public Library, Quincy, Massachusetts (c. 1882)
- Unity Church of North Easton, Massachusetts (1882)
- Church of St. Joseph of Arimathea in Greenburgh, New York (1883)
- Blessed Sacrament Church, Providence, Rhode Island The church was designed by George Lewis Heins and Christopher Grant La Farge, LaFarge's brother-in-law, and his eldest son. https://library.bc.edu/lafargeglass/exhibits/show/descriptions/st-john/blessed-sacrament
- Christ Church in Lincoln, Rhode Island (1884)
- Trinity Episcopal Church in Buffalo, New York (1886–89)
- St. Paul's Chapel, Columbia University, NYC (1888–99)
- All Saints Episcopal Church, Briarcliff Manor, New York (1889)
- All Souls Unitarian Church, Roxbury, Massachusetts
- First Unitarian Church of Detroit (1890)
- St. Mary's-in-Tuxedo Episcopal Church, Tuxedo Park, New York (1890)
- The Cathedral of All Saints, Albany, New York (c. 1890)
- Judson Memorial Church, NYC (1890–93)
- First Unitarian Church of Philadelphia (1891)
- Caldwell Sisters' chapel, Newport, Rhode Island, re-located to Our Lady of Mercy Chapel at Salve Regina University in Newport (1891)
- Mount Vernon Church, Boston (c. 1893)
- Church of the Ascension, Episcopal, (Manhattan)
- Church of the Transfiguration, Episcopal, New York City (1898)
- John Harvard Window, Southwark Cathedral, London, England (1907)
- First Congregational Church of Natick, Natick, Massachusetts

Several of his windows, including Peonies Blown in the Wind (1880), are in the collection of the Metropolitan Museum of Art, New York.

=== Dispute with Tiffany ===
La Farge apparently introduced Tiffany to the new use of opalescent glass sometime in the mid-1870s, showing him his experiments. Sometime in the late 1870s or early 1880s, however, relations between the artists soured, probably due to a lawsuit between the two men.

Eight months later, Tiffany applied for a similar patent, which was granted in 1881 as no. 237,417. The major difference in their patents is that Tiffany lists somewhat different technical details, for instance relating to the air space between glass layers. Since La Farge's patent focused more on the material and Tiffany's more on its use in construction, it appeared that the two patents might be mutually dependent, prohibiting either artist from making stained-glass windows without the other's permission. There is some indication that La Farge may have come to some kind of agreement with Tiffany on the use of La Farge's patent, but the details are unclear and disputed by scholars. What does seem certain is that around 1882 La Farge planned to sue Tiffany, claiming that Tiffany had infringed his patent by appropriating some of his working methods for opalescent sheet glass. Official records of the lawsuit have not been found, suggesting it was never filed, but there are multiple references to it in the correspondence of both men. Possibly, as stained glass increased in popularity, drawing other artists to the medium, both La Farge and Tiffany decided it would be too much trouble to legally defend their patents.

== Personal life ==
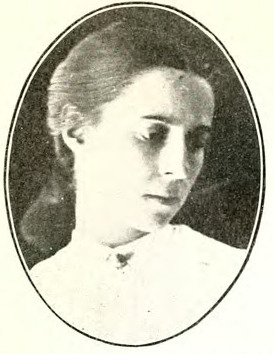
Margaret Mason Perry LaFarge

On October 15, 1860, he was married to Margaret Mason Perry (1839–1925) at Newport, Rhode Island. She was the daughter of Christopher Grant Perry, and the granddaughter of Commodore Oliver Hazard Perry, and great-granddaughter of Sarah Franklin Bache. They were descendants of colonial leaders Governor Thomas Prence (1599–1673) and Elder William Brewster (c. 1567–1644), who had been a passenger on the Mayflower.

Together, Margaret and John had eight children:

- Christopher Grant La Farge (1862–1938), who was a partner in the New York-based architectural firm of Heins & LaFarge. He designed projects in Beaux-Arts style, notably the original Byzantine Cathedral of St. John the Divine, the Yale undergraduate society St. Anthony Hall (extant 1893–1913) and the original Astor Court buildings of the Bronx Zoo.
- Emily Marie La Farge (1862–1890), who married William Rehn Claxton
- John Louis Bancel La Farge (1865–1938), who married Mabel Hooper
- Margaret Angela La Farge (1867–1956)
- Oliver Hazard Perry La Farge (1869–1936), who also became an architect and real estate developer. Part of his career in real estate was in a Seattle partnership with Marshall Latham Bond, Bond & La Farge. He designed the Perry Building, still standing in the city. Later in life O.H.P. La Farge designed buildings for General Motors.
- Joseph Raymond La Farge (1872–1872), who died in infancy
- Frances Aimee La Farge (1874–1951), who married Edward H. Childs (b. 1869)
- John La Farge, Jr., S.J. (1880–1963), who became a Jesuit priest and a strong supporter of anti-racist policies.

La Farge died at Butler Hospital, in Providence, Rhode Island, in 1910. The interment was at Green-Wood Cemetery, in Brooklyn, New York.

Through his eldest son Christopher, he was the grandfather of Christopher La Farge, a novelist and poet, and Oliver La Farge, a noted writer and anthropologist. Peter La Farge, son of Oliver, was a celebrated songwriter in Greenwich Village in the 1960s. He penned "The Ballad of Ira Hayes," made famous by Johnny Cash.

Through his daughter Frances, he was the grandfather of Frances Sergeant Childs, who was a member of the founding faculty of Brooklyn College, where she was a professor of history.

== Writing ==
La Farge's writings include:

- The American Art of Glass (a pamphlet)
- Considerations on Painting (New York, 1895)
- An Artist's Letters from Japan (New York, 1897)
- The Great Masters (New York)
- Hokusai: a talk about Japanese painting (New York, 1897)
- The Higher Life in Art (New York, 1908)
- One Hundred Great Masterpieces
- Reminiscences of the South Seas (1912)
- The Gospel Story in Art (New York, 1913)
- Letters from the South Seas (unpublished)
- Correspondence (unpublished)

His papers, together with some of those of certain children and grandchildren, are held by Yale University Library.

== In popular culture ==
John La Farge is a minor character in Anya Seton's novel The Hearth and Eagle, where he appears as a friend of the fictional artist Evan Redlake.

== See also ==
- John Humphreys Johnston

== Bibliography ==
- Adams, Foster, La Farge, Weinberg, Wren and Yarnell, John La Farge, Abbeville Publishing Group, NY, NY 1987
- Cortissoz, Royal, John La Farge: A Memoir and a Study, Houghton Mifflin Company, Boston 1911
- Forbes, David W., "Encounters with Paradise: Views of Hawaii and its People, 1778–1941", Honolulu Academy of Arts, 1992, 201–220.
- Gaede, Robert and Robert Kalin, Guide to Cleveland Architecture, Cleveland Chapter of the American Institute of Architects, Cleveland OH 1991
- Kowski, Goldman et al., Buffalo Architecture:A Guide, The MIT Press, Cambridge MA 1981
- Mather, Frank Jewett Jr. (April 1911). "John La Farge – An Appreciation". The World's Work: A History of Our Time. XXI: 14085–14100.
- Waern, Cecilia, John La Farge: Artist and Writer, Seeley and Co. Limited, London 1896

== Gallery ==
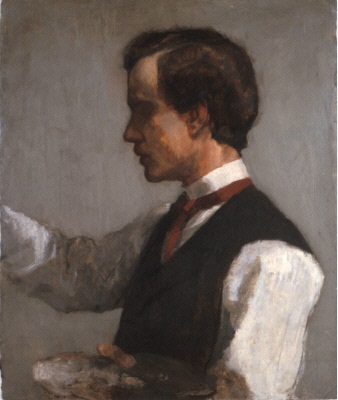
Portrait of William James, circa 1859

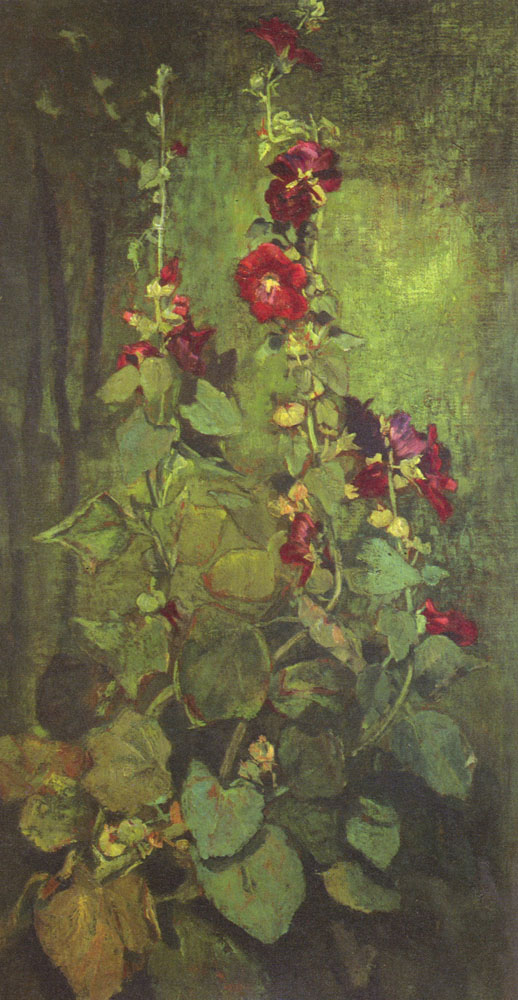
Agathon to Erosanthe, Votive Wreath, 1861

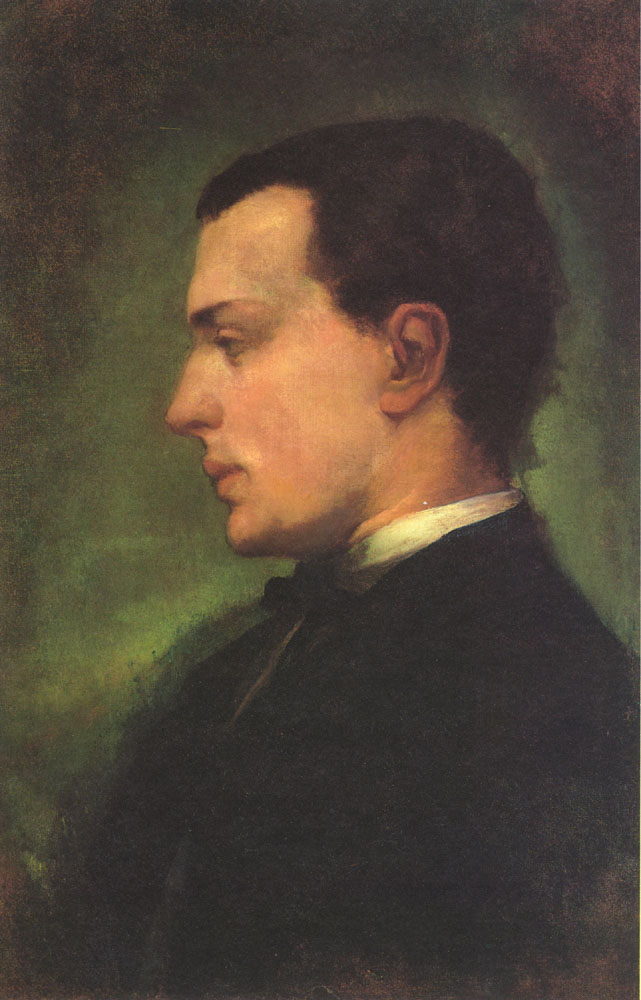
Portrait of the Novelist Henry James, 1862

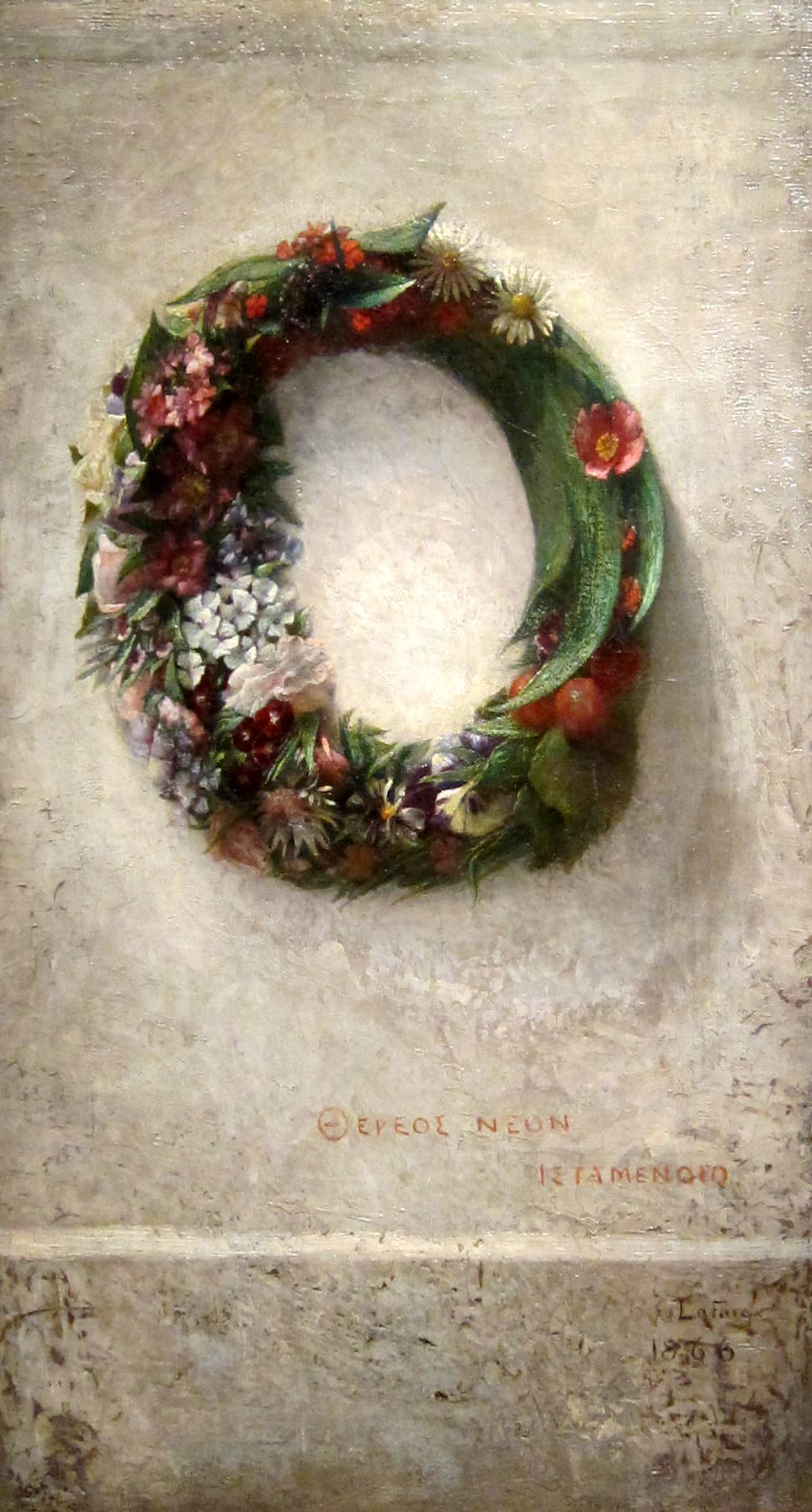
Wreath of Flowers, 1866, Smithsonian American Art Museum

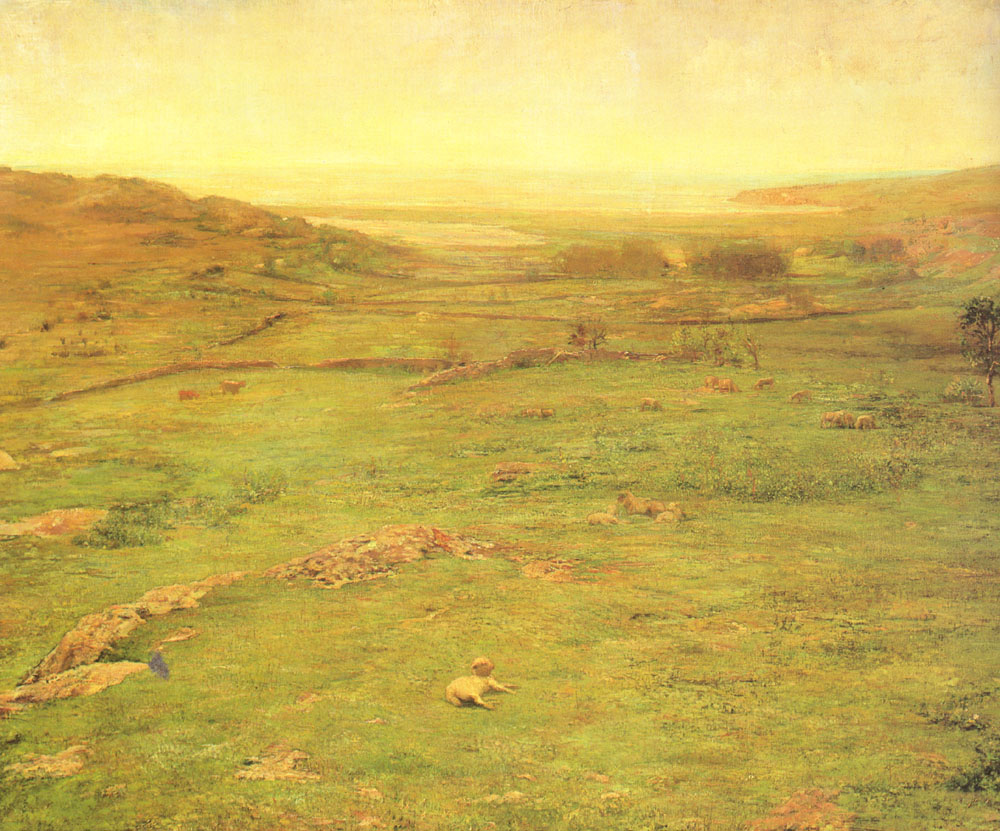
Paradise Valley, 1866–68

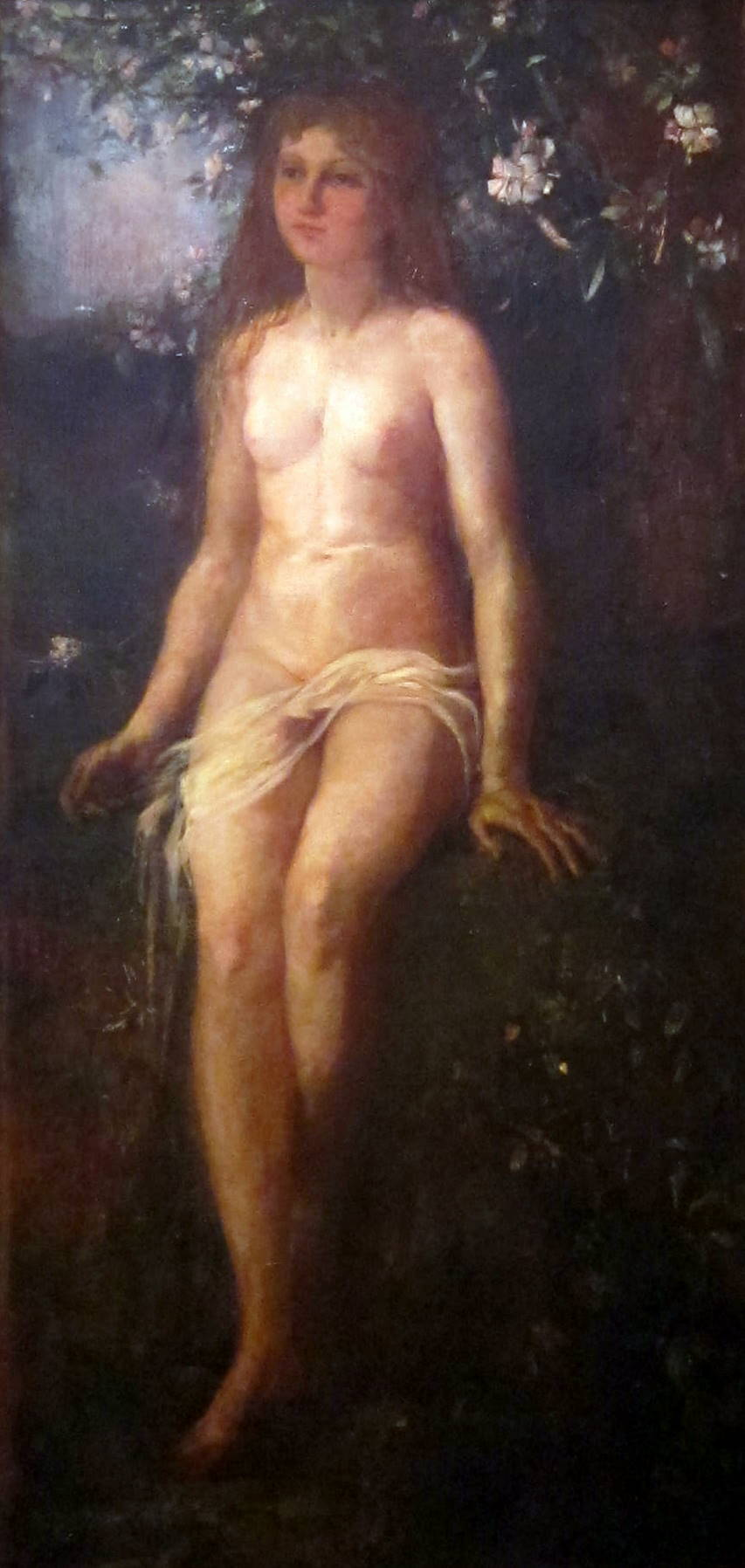
The Golden Age, 1878, Smithsonian American Art Museum

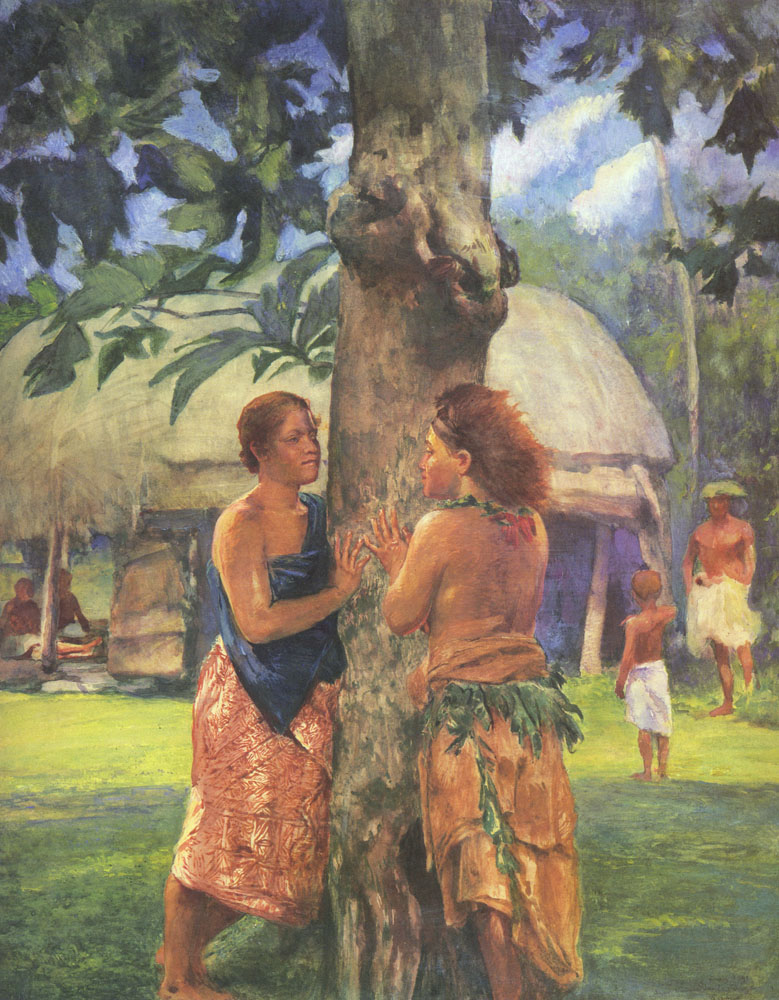
Portrait of Faase, the Taupo of the Fagaloa Bay, Samoa, 1881

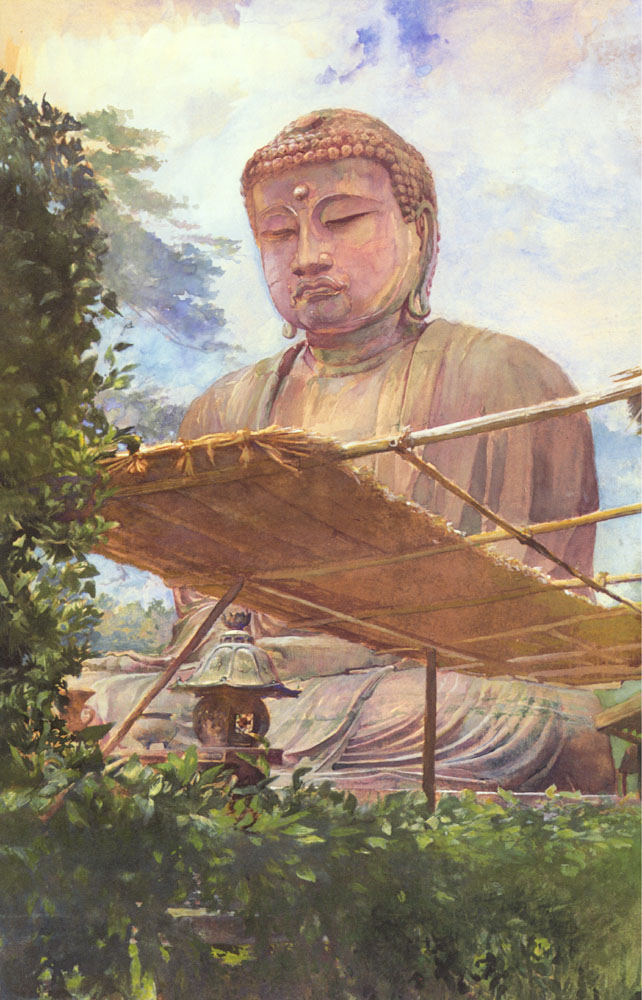
The Great Statue of Amida Buddha at Kamakura, 1886

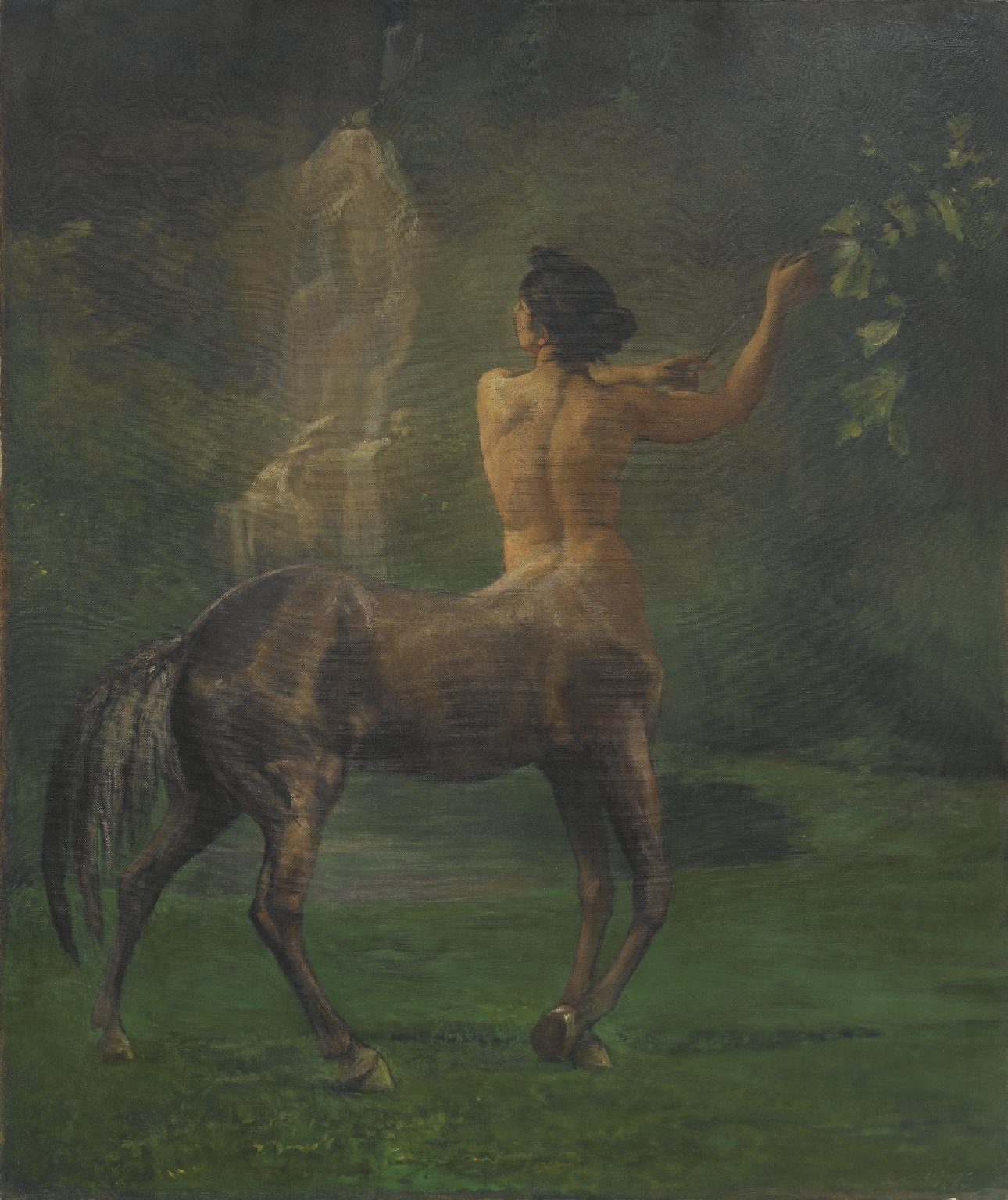
Centauress, c. 1887

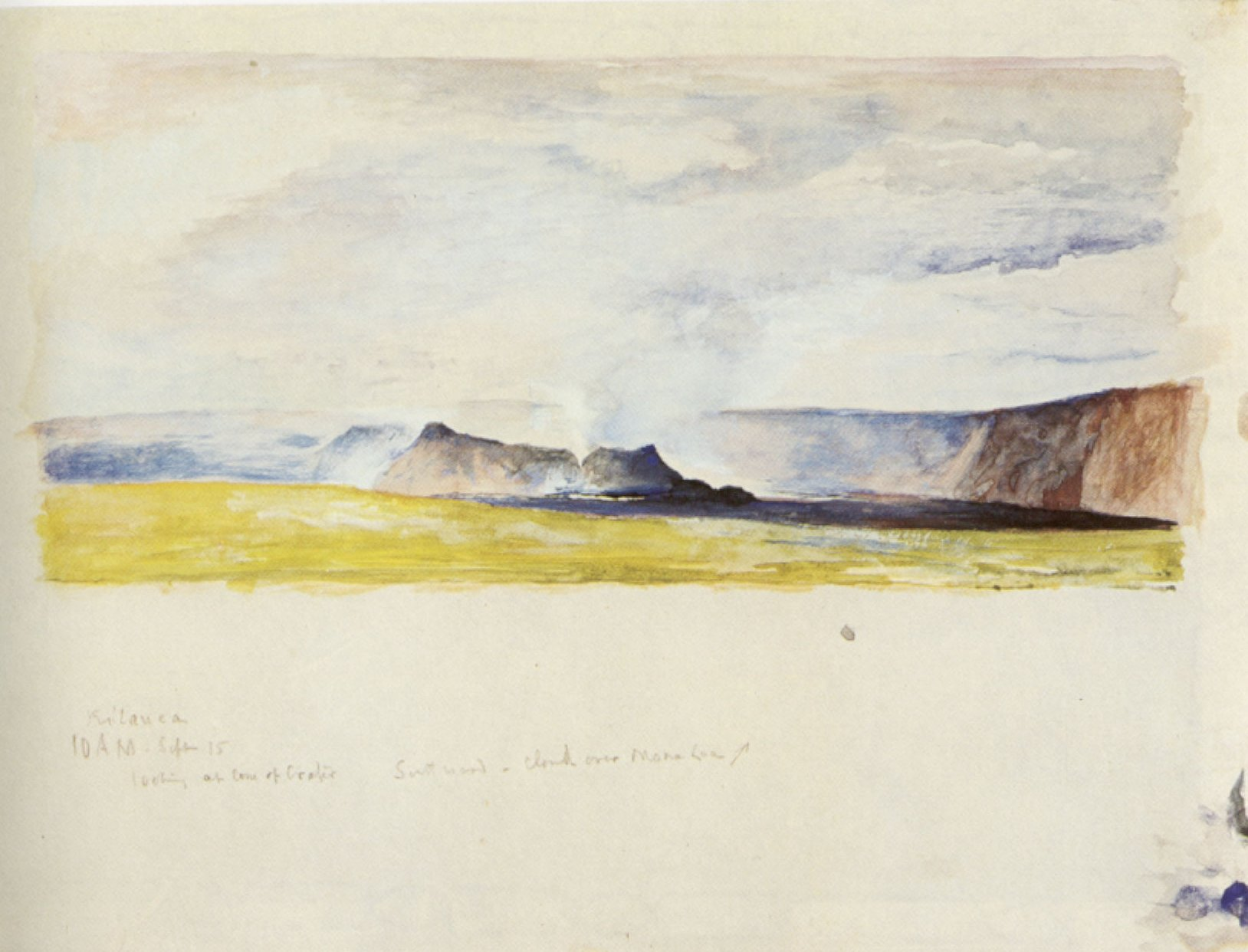
Kilauea, Looking at Cone of Crater, 1890, Honolulu Museum of Art

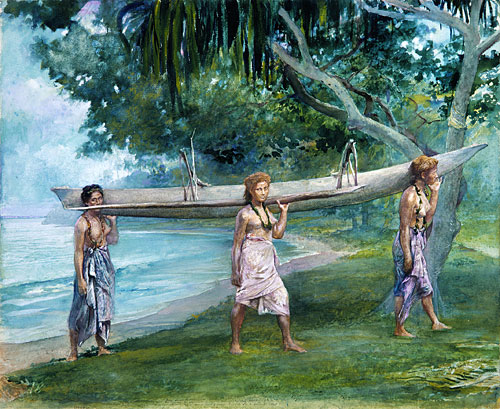
Girls Carrying a Canoe, Vaiala in Samoa, 1891

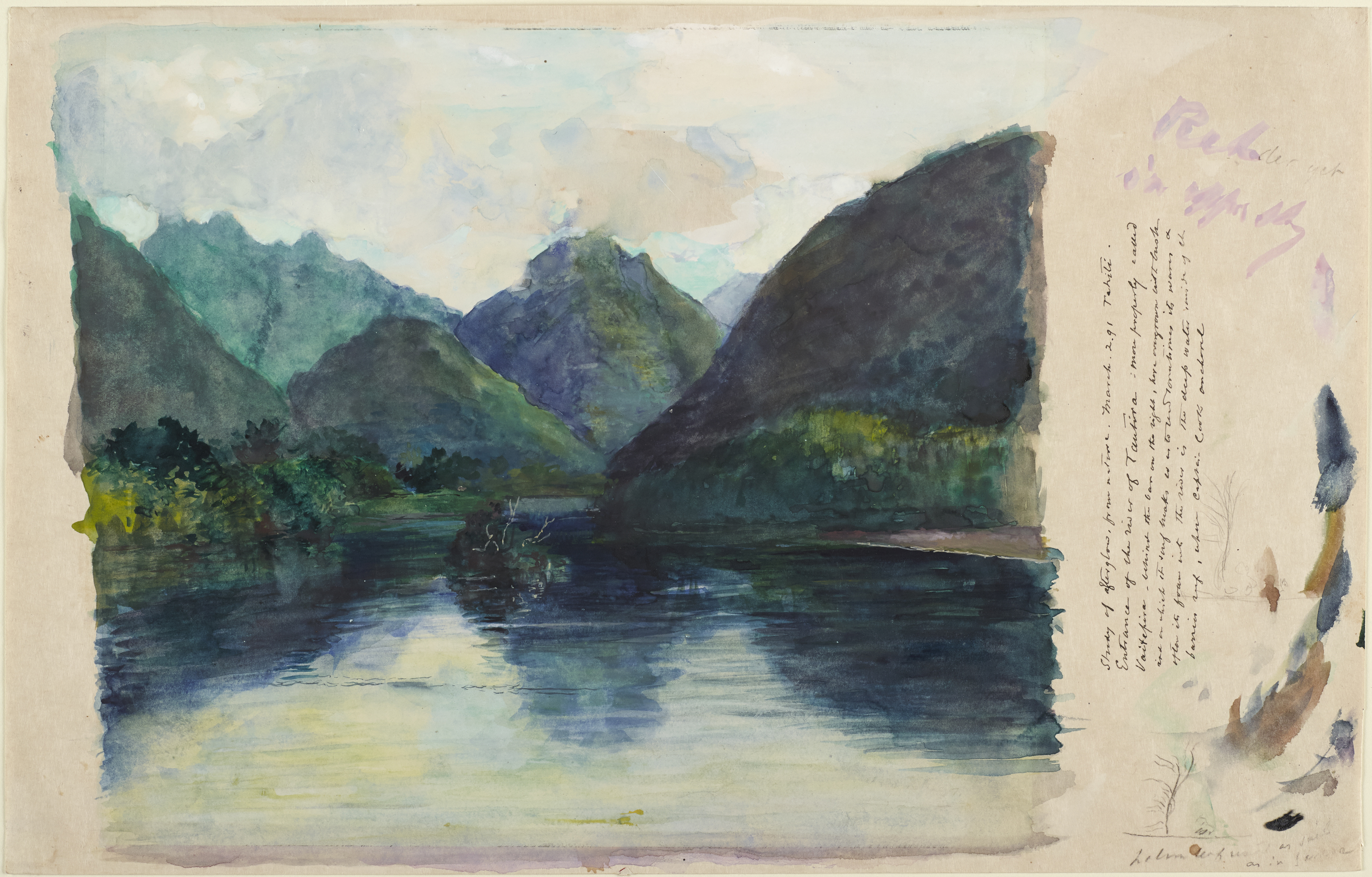
Study of Afterglow from Nature (Tahiti: Entrance to Tautira Valley), 1891, Princeton University Art Museum

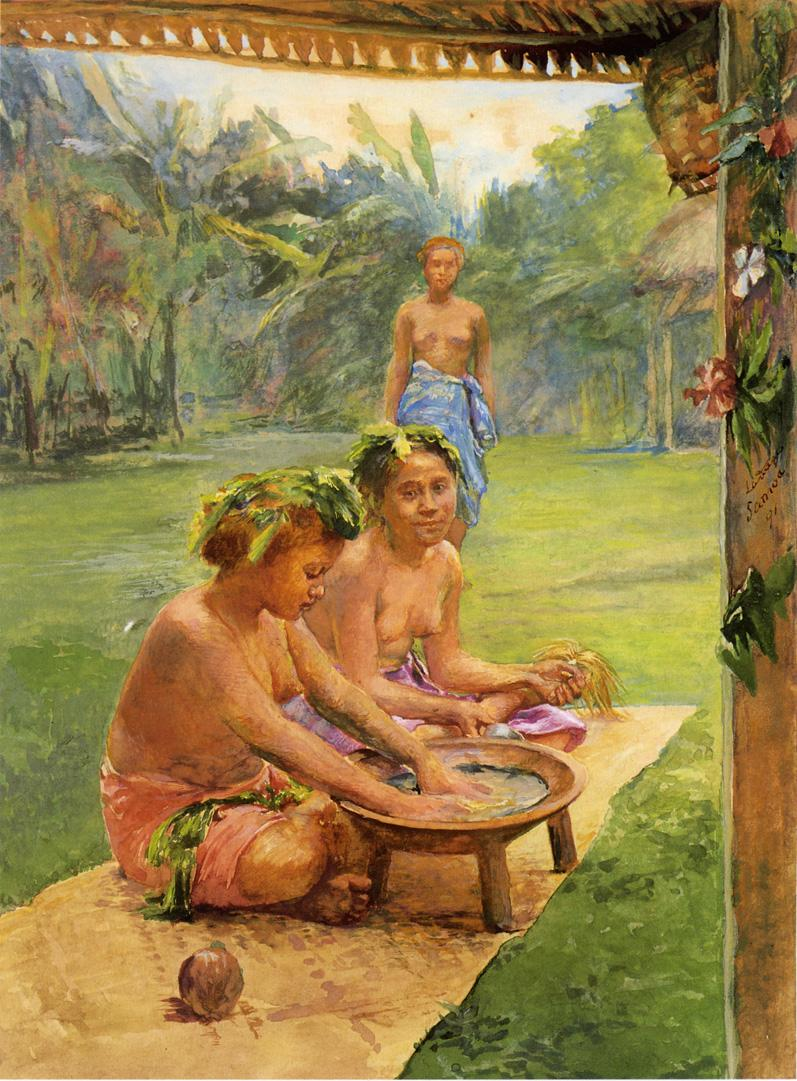
Young Girls Preparing Kava Outside of the Hut whose Posts are Decorated with Flowers, 1891

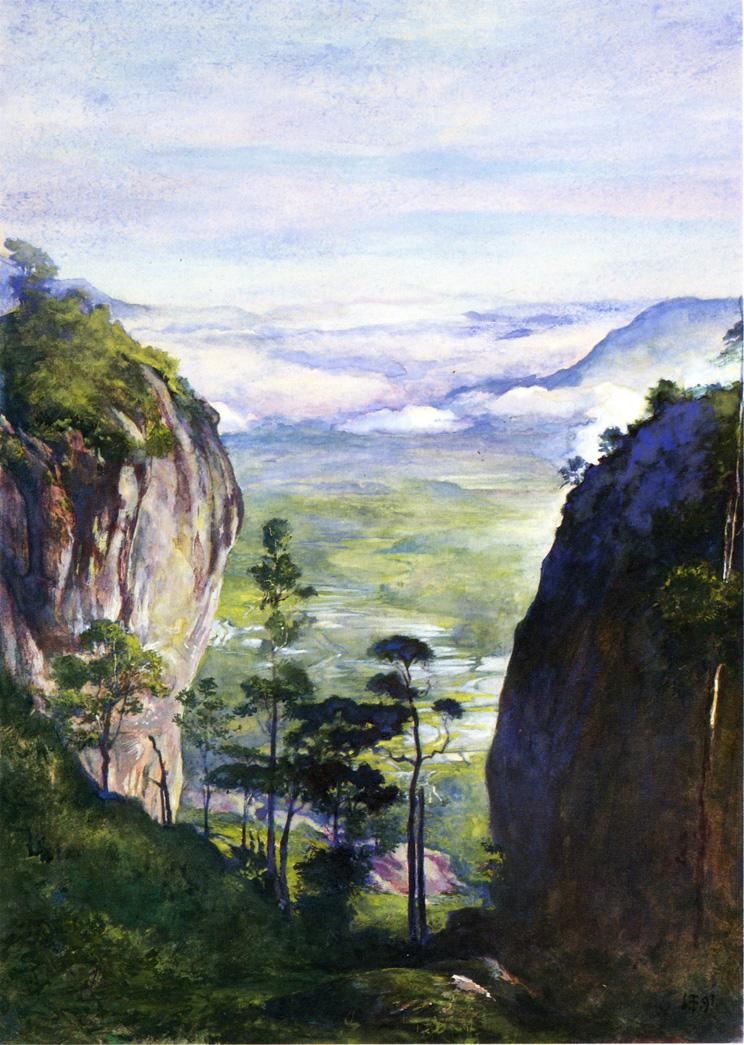
View in Ceylon, near Dambula

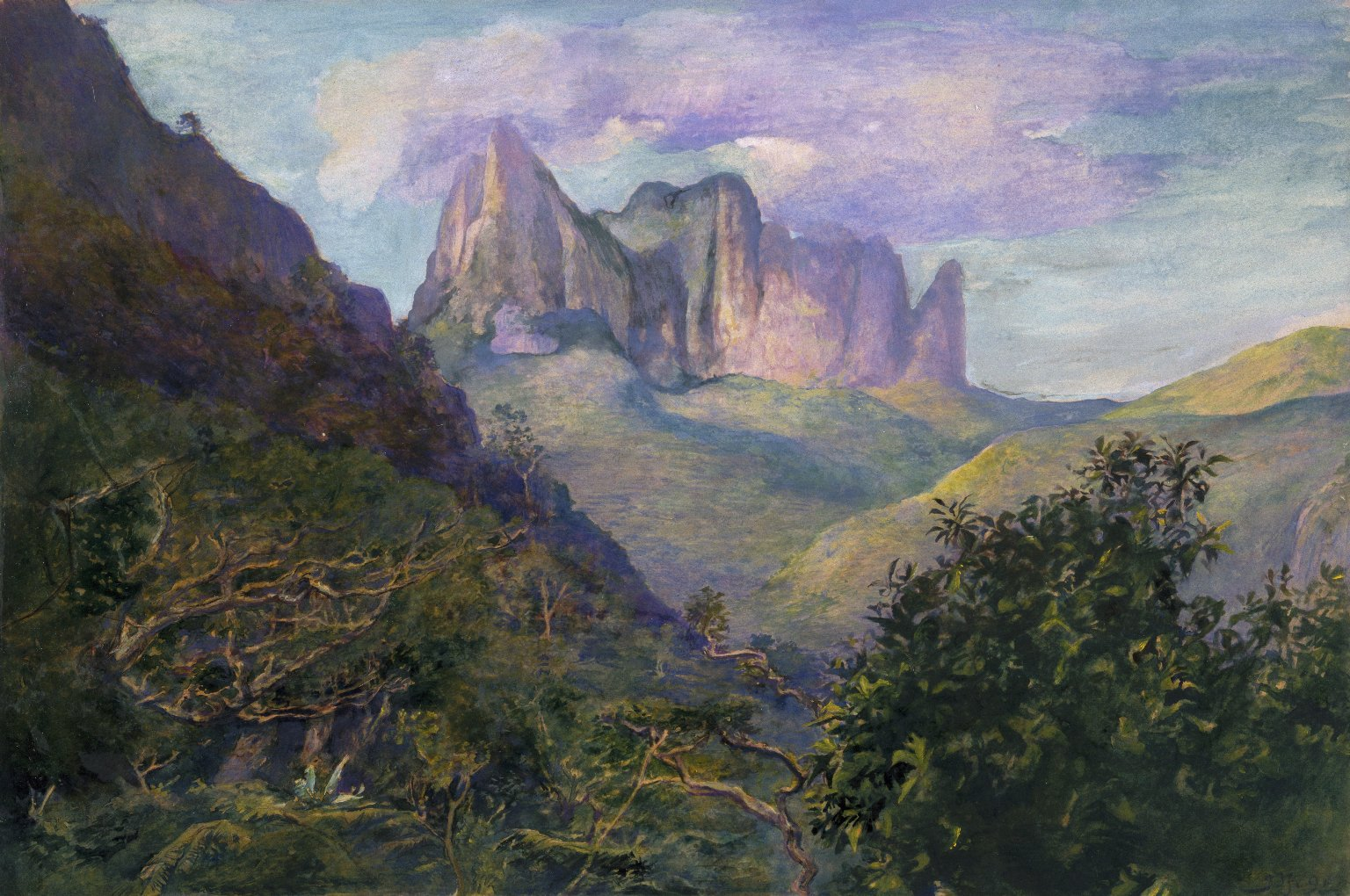
Diadem Mountain at Sunset, Tahiti - Brooklyn Museum

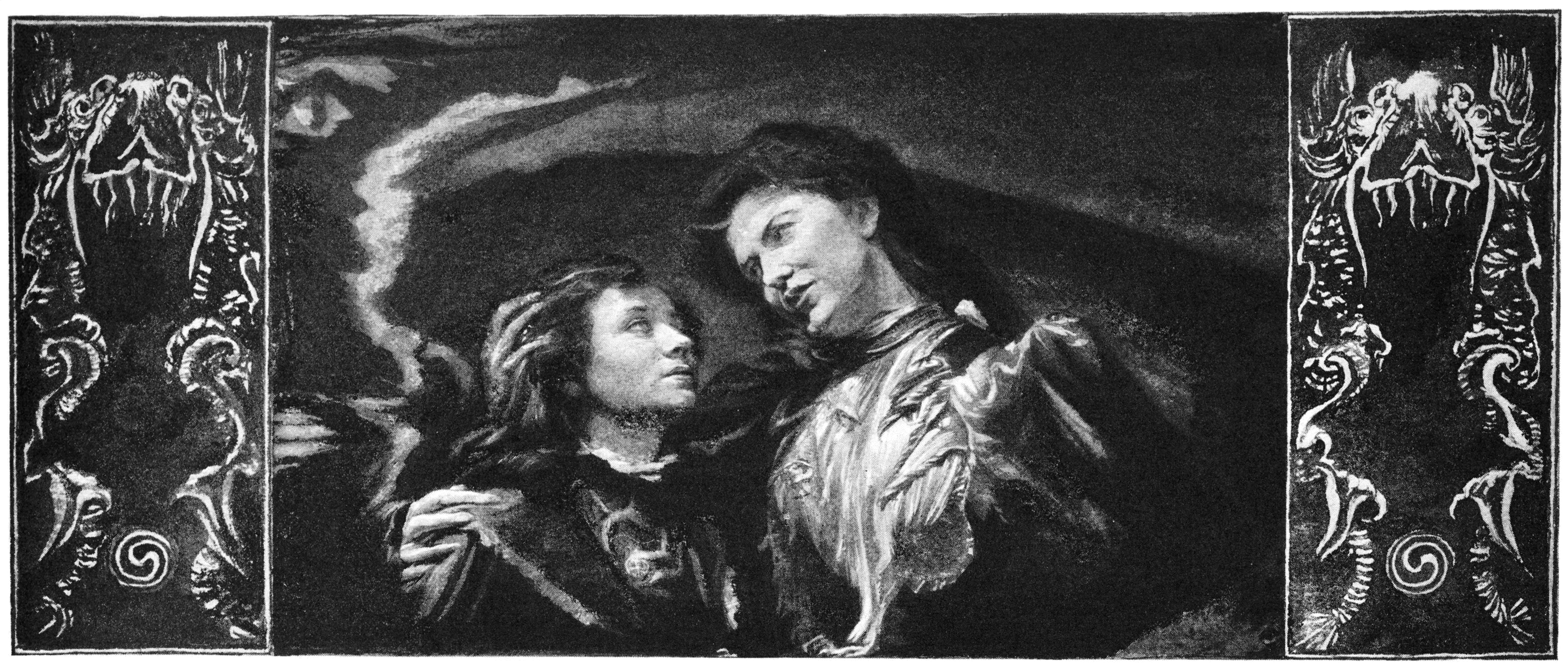
Title illustration for the Collier's Weekly serialization of The Turn of the Screw, 1898

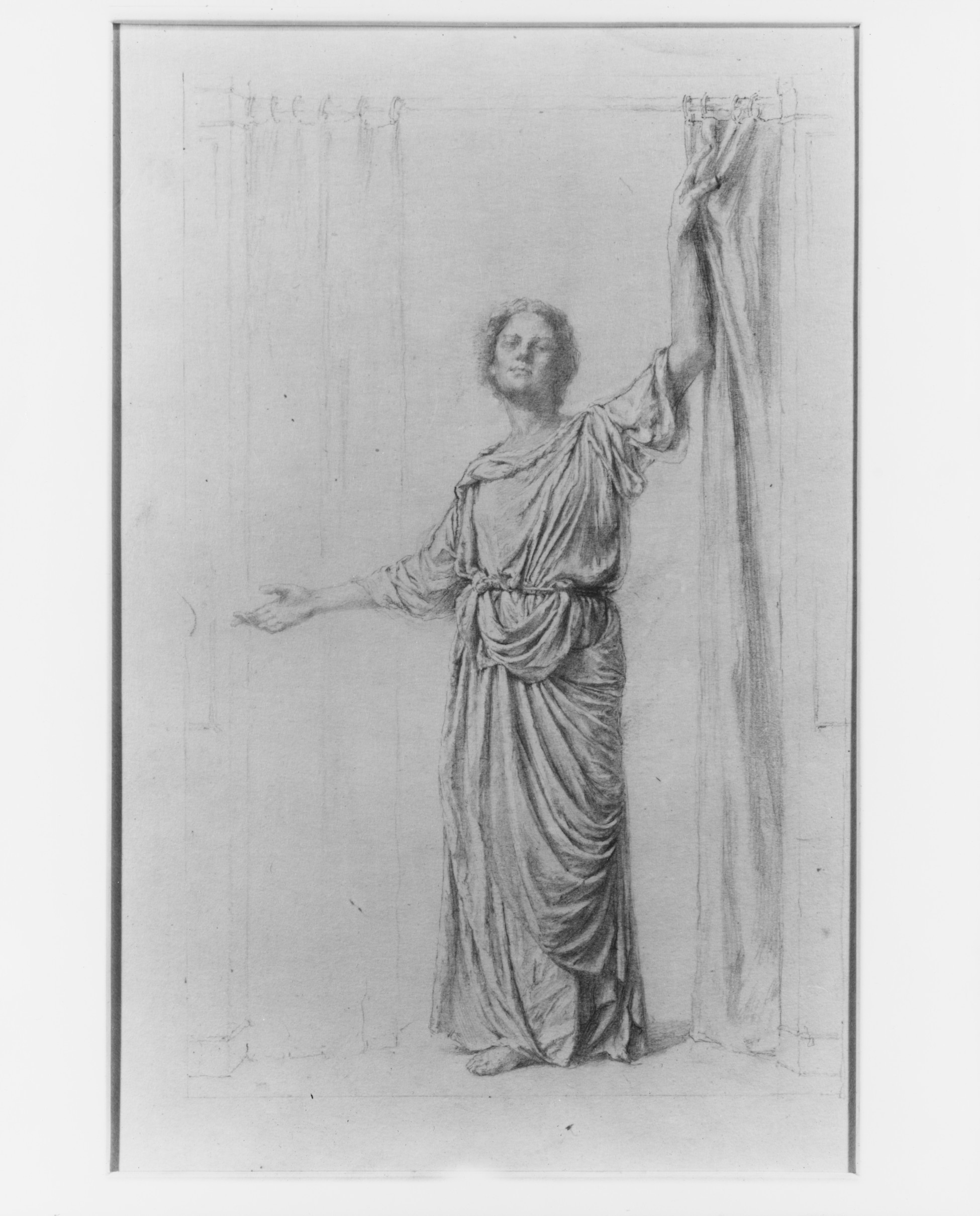
