= Game of graces =

Activity for young women the early 1800s

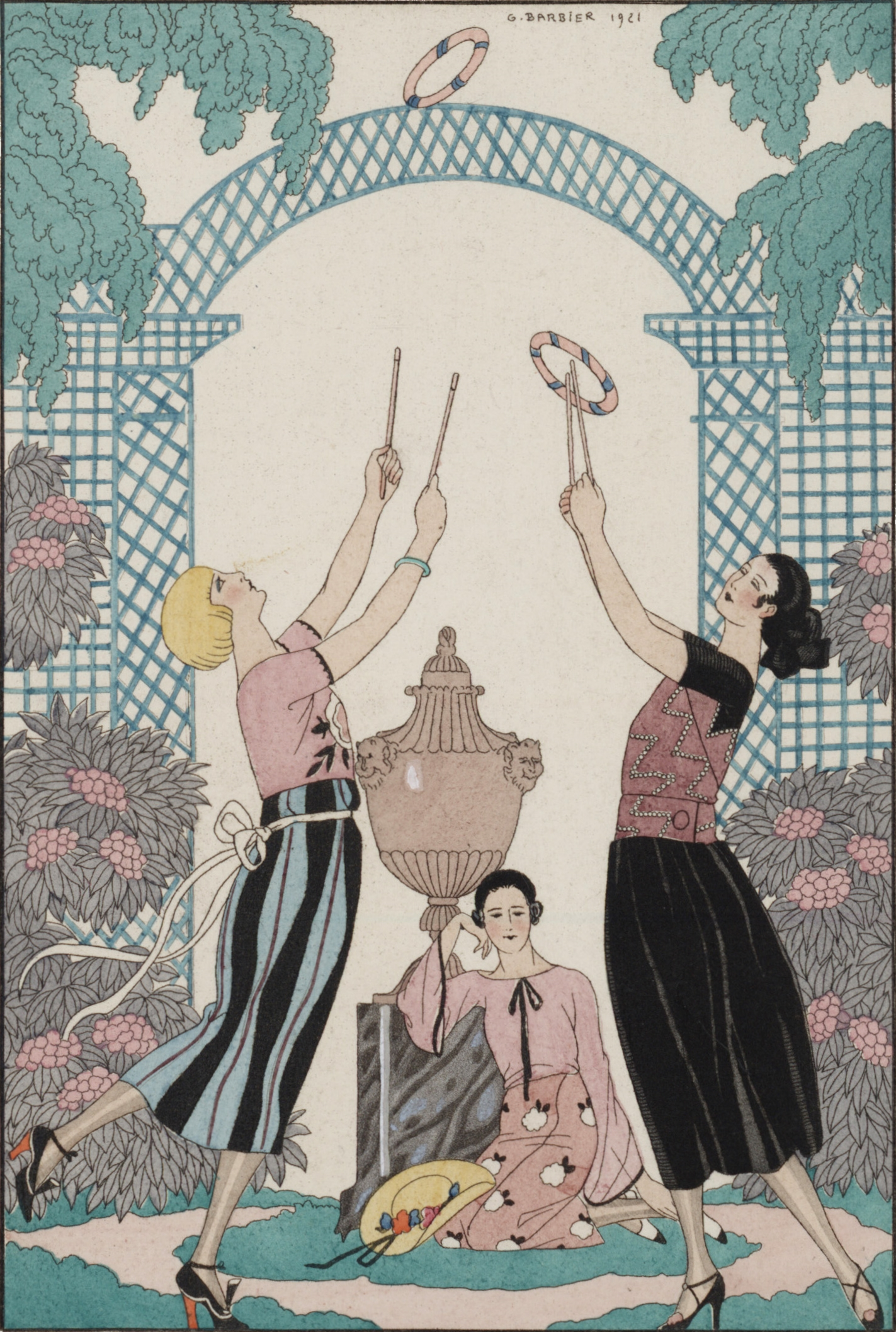
Illustration of young women playing graces, 1921

The game of graces was a popular activity for young girls during the early 1800s. The game was invented in France during the first quarter of the 19th century and called le jeu des graces. The game of graces was considered a proper game – one befitting young ladies and, supposedly, one that would make them more graceful.

Graces was hardly ever played by boys, and never played by two boys at the same time; the players were always either two girls, or a boy and a girl.

== How to play ==
Graces is played with two people. Each person gets two dowel rods. Then, one of the players takes a wooden hoop and, pulling apart the two rods, sends the hoop into the air for the other player to try to catch. The winner is the player who is first to catch the hoop ten times.

This game is easy to learn for all ages, but mastering aiming the hoop can take longer. Mastering catching the hoop depends a lot upon who is launching it to you and their skill level. To throw the hoop, one takes the hoop and, with one rod in each hand, places the hoop over both of the rods so that they are inside of the hoop. The player then lets the hoop slide slightly down the rod and crosses the rods in an X shape. Ideally, the hoop is on the lower triangle of the X shape and the rods are pointed up at about a 45⁰ angle. Then, pulling the rods apart quickly, the hoop slides up and shoots away from the player, towards the direction in which the player aims.

The hoop is generally 9 inches (23 cm) in diameter and decorated with different colored ribbons. The ribbons, used to make the hoop softer to catch and to support the hoop from coming apart, are alternatingly wrapped all around the hoop, with the ends left hanging off so that they will slow down the hoop's flight. The rods are 15 inches (38 cm) to 2 feet (61 cm) long. Some rods come to a point.

== Modern times ==
In 2011 System Enterprises, a toy company based in Florida, introduced a game called RingStix, which can now be found in several specialty toy stores across the United States. The concept is the same, but the rods have been replaced by curved sticks and the wooden ring by a plastic glow-in-the-dark ring.

== Traditional Variants ==
Serso is a one stick variant played in Poland. Two people face each other with some distance in between them, and each carrying only one stick. The player with the ring throws it toward the other person using his free hand, and the other person attempts to catch it with his stick. The other person then removes the ring from his stick before throwing it back with his free hand to the first person (who attempts to catch it with his stick). The game continues indefinitely. The game reached popularity in the 19th. and 20th. century. Serso is phonetically equivalent to cerceau in French which means "circle". The game is thought to have derived from ancient Rome.
