= Sunlight and Shadow: The Newbury Marshes =

Painting by Martin Johnson Heade

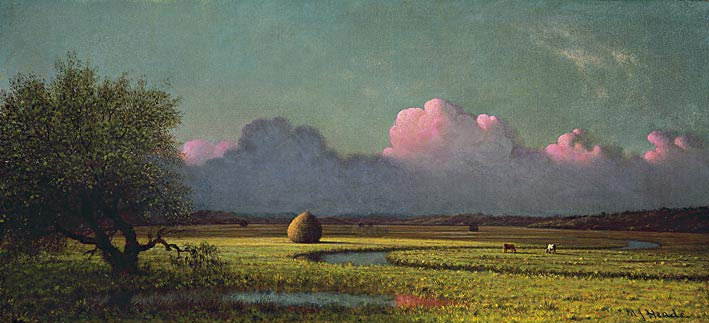
- Artist: Martin Johnson Heade
- Year: c. 1871–75
- Medium: oil on canvas
- Dimensions: 30.5 cm × 67.3 cm (12.0 in × 26.5 in)
- Location: National Gallery of Art; Washington, D.C.

Sunlight and Shadow: The Newbury Marshes is an oil-on-canvas landscape by the American artist Martin Johnson Heade, from c. 1871–1875. It is held at the National Gallery of Art, in Washington, D.C..

== History and description ==
Heade probably became acquainted with the salt marshes near the mouth of the Merrimack River at Newbury and Newburyport, Massachusetts in 1859 through Bishop Thomas March Clark. Sunlight and Shadow is one of the earliest of Heade's one hundred plus depictions of wetlands. The painting was acquired by the National Gallery of Art in 2010.

The National Gallery writes: "[Heade] depicted the tides, meteorological phenomena, and other natural forces that shaped the appearance of the swamp and showed how the land was used for hunting, fishing, and the harvesting of naturally occurring salt hay ... the painting's primary motif, sunlight and shadow, seen, for instance, in its intricate cloud shadows and the subtle movement from light to dark across the body of the haystack, informs and unites all its visual elements."
