= Giant Magnolias on a Blue Velvet Cloth =

Painting by Martin Johnson Heade

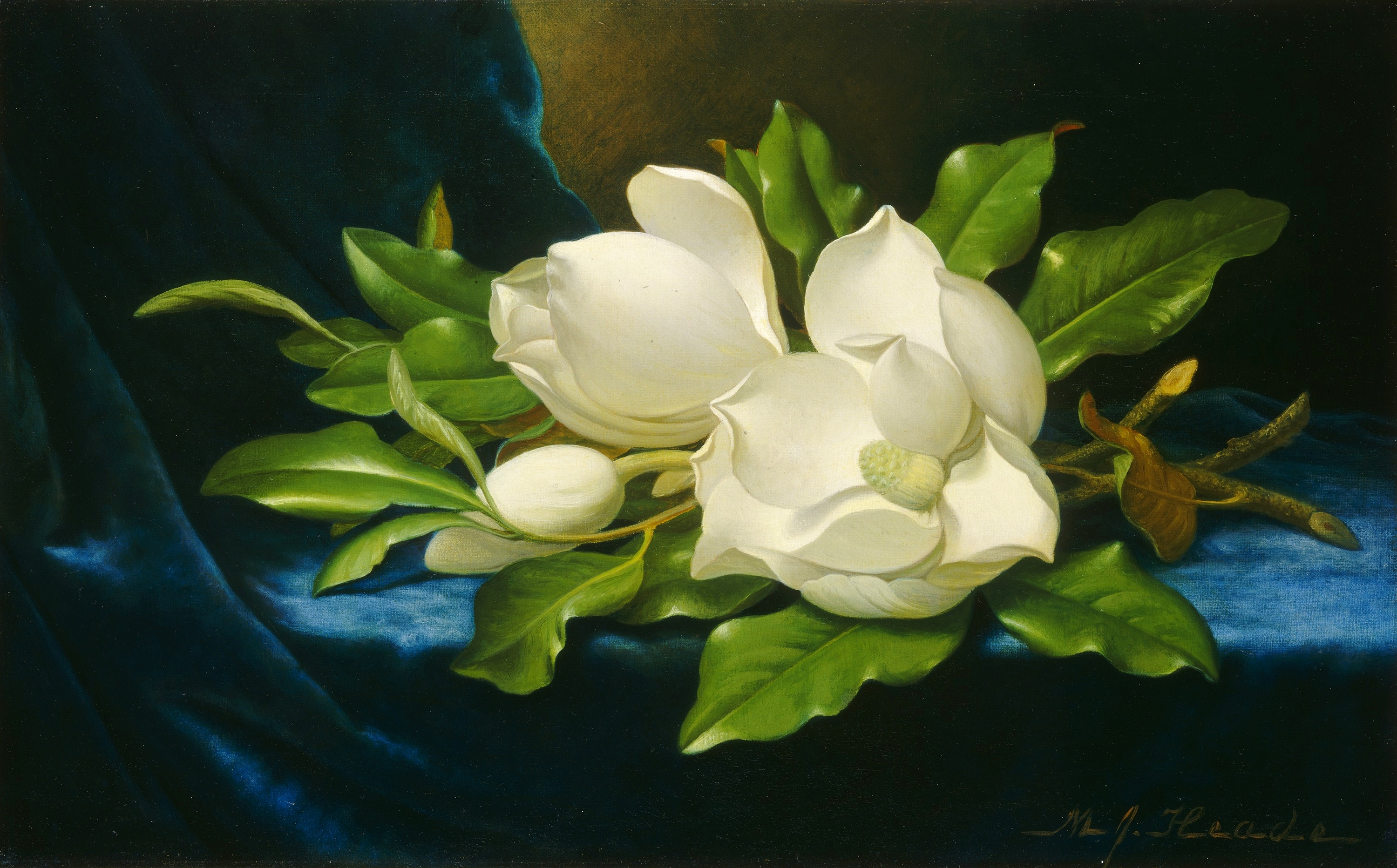
- Artist: Martin Johnson Heade
- Year: 1890
- Medium: oil on canvas
- Dimensions: 38.4 cm × 61.5 cm (15.1 in × 24.2 in)
- Location: National Gallery of Art, Washington, D.C.

Giant Magnolias on a Blue Velvet Cloth is an oil-on-canvas still life by the American artist Martin Johnson Heade, from 1890. It was acquired by the National Gallery of Art, in Washington, D.C. in 1982.

== History and description ==
Heade made significant contributions to floral still-life painting during the course of his career, the NGA points out, with Giant Magnolias being one of the finest. Heade married in 1883 and settled in St. Augustine, Florida after a lackluster career as an itinerant artist. He was patronized by Floridian Henry Morrison Flagler, an oil and railroad magnate, who regularly purchased his works. The NGA believes this personal and professional stability stimulated the production of the still-life paintings of Heade's last years.

The NGA writes, "Certainly works such as Giant Magnolias on a Blue Velvet Cloth, with their striking contrasts of brilliantly lit flowers and leaves set against a dark background, are among the most original still lifes of the nineteenth century. They are also for many observers strongly sensual, their lush colors, full, curving contours, overall sense of opulence, and implied perfumed scent of the flowers suggestive, perhaps, of female nudes languidly reclining on luxurious couches."
