= Approaching Thunder Storm =

Painting by Martin Johnson Heade

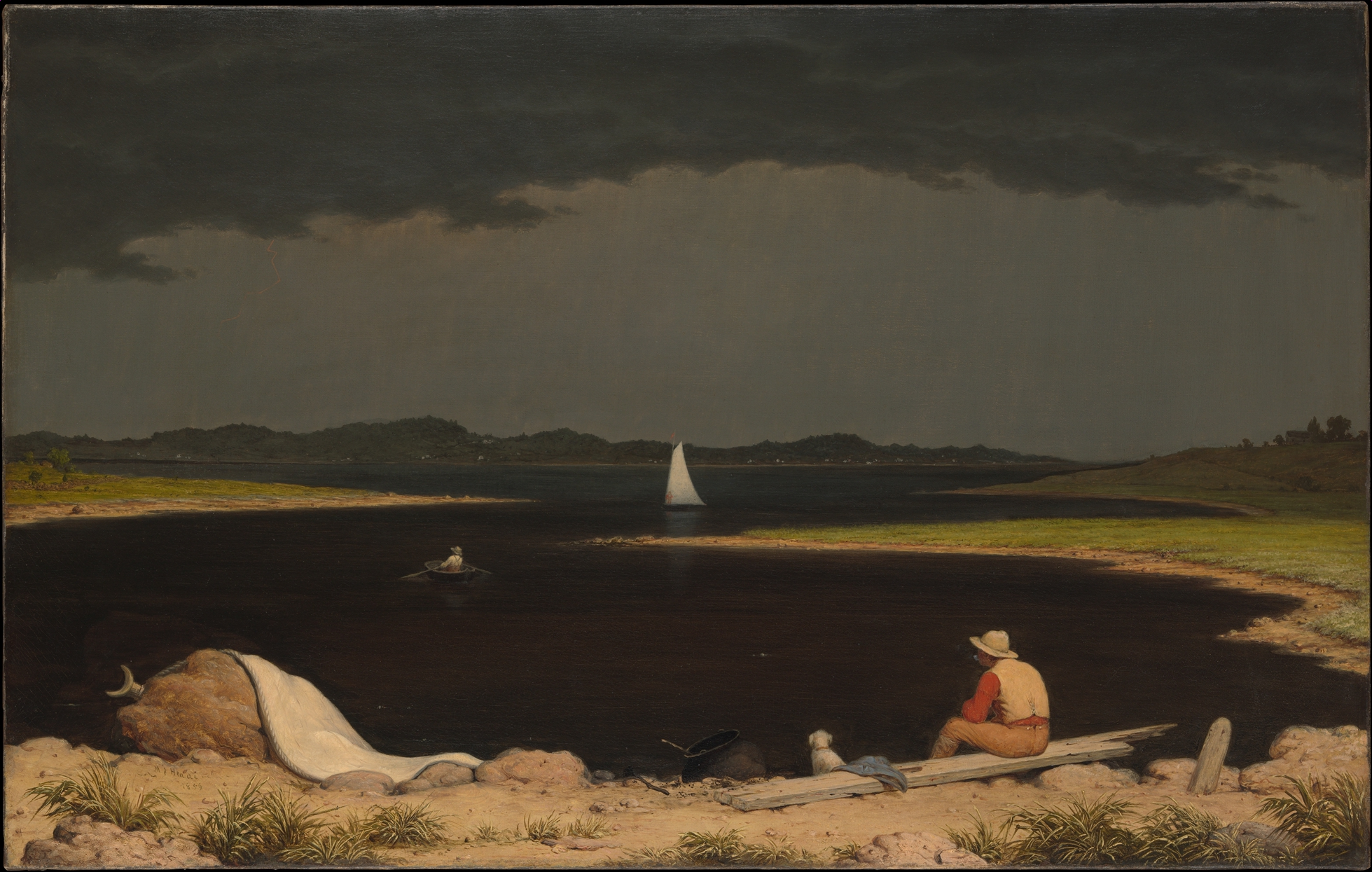
- Artist: Martin Johnson Heade
- Year: 1859
- Medium: Oil on canvas
- Dimensions: 71.1 cm × 111.8 cm (28.0 in × 44.0 in)
- Location: Metropolitan Museum of Art; New York

Approaching Thunder Storm is an 1859 painting by American painter Martin Johnson Heade. It was his largest painting to date. The painting is in the collection of the Metropolitan Museum of Art. It is praised for its dramatic depiction of the threatening mood of blackening skies and eerily illuminated terrain prior to the storm itself. The painting has been connected to mounting tensions before the Civil War, which were often expressed in terms of natural imagery.

One of a series of paintings by Heade of coastal landscapes, this work was based on a sketch that Heade made of an approaching storm on Narragansett Bay, Rhode Island. Here, a fisherman sits by the shore watching the storm approach; there is a faint red bolt of lightning in the left part of the sky. To his left are a dog, an iron kettle, and a spread-out boat sail. Another fisherman is rowing toward the shore, having left his sailboat out on the bay. His placement in the composition helps provide a sense of distance and a narrative for the scene.

Strazdes suggests that "Heade, by refusing to prettify his scenery by association, was attempting to inject into his artistic vision a serious, monumental simplicity it had not previously possessed." The composition is very open, as if seen through a wide-angle lens, and relatively empty. The swathes of dark color are novel for a landscape work. The long horizon is an influence from Heade's contemporary, Frederic Edwin Church (with whom he shared a studio), as in paintings such as Niagara.

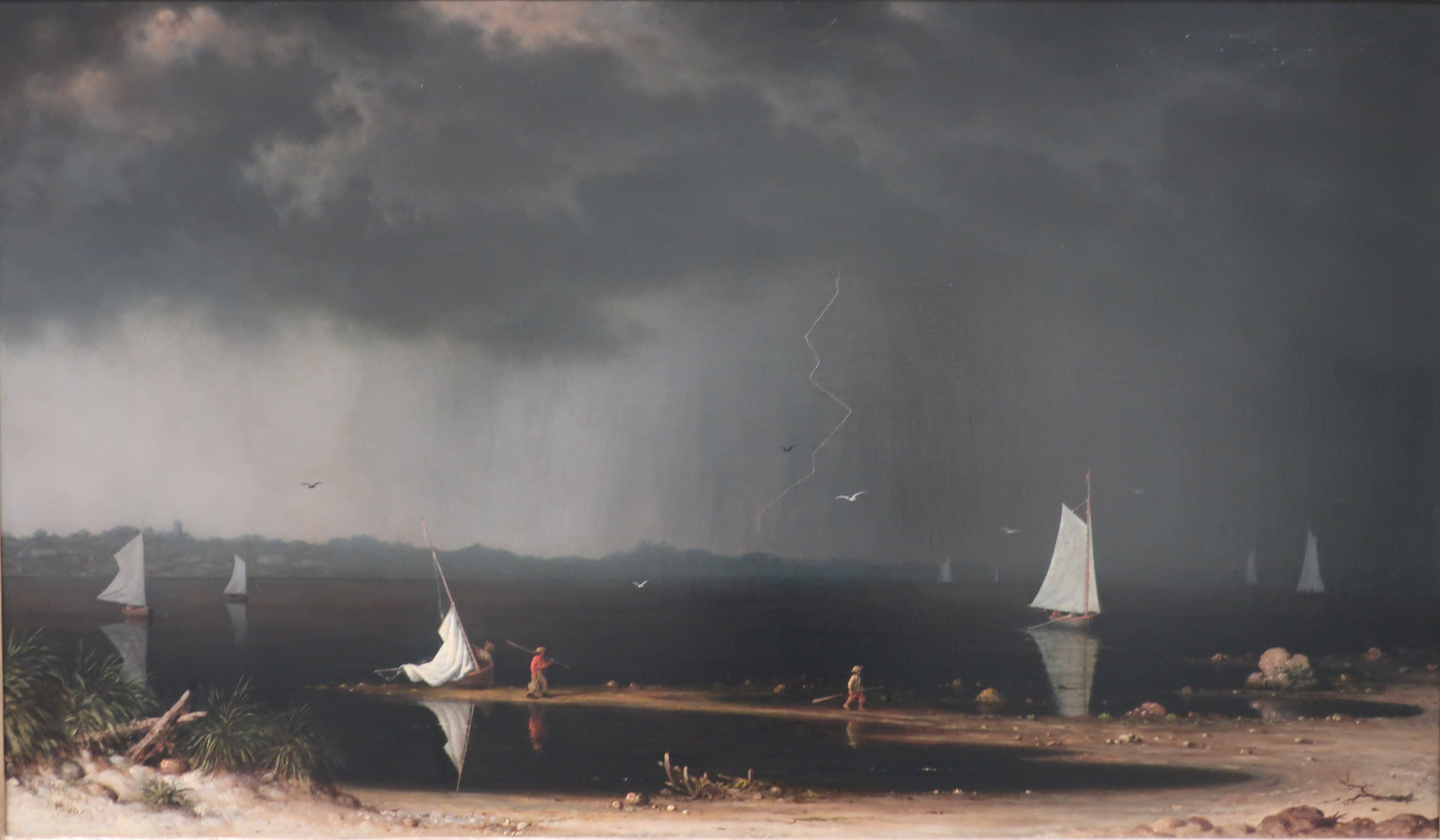
Heade, Thunder Storm on Narragansett Bay (1868)

Numerous pentimenti suggest that Heade altered the composition over time; for example, the hills on the horizon were originally larger and more jagged. Records suggest that Approaching Thunder Storm was exhibited at the National Academy of Design in 1860. In 1868, Heade painted Thunder Storm on Narragansett Bay, a similar composition.
