= The Magnolia Blossom =

1888 painting by Martin Johnson Heade

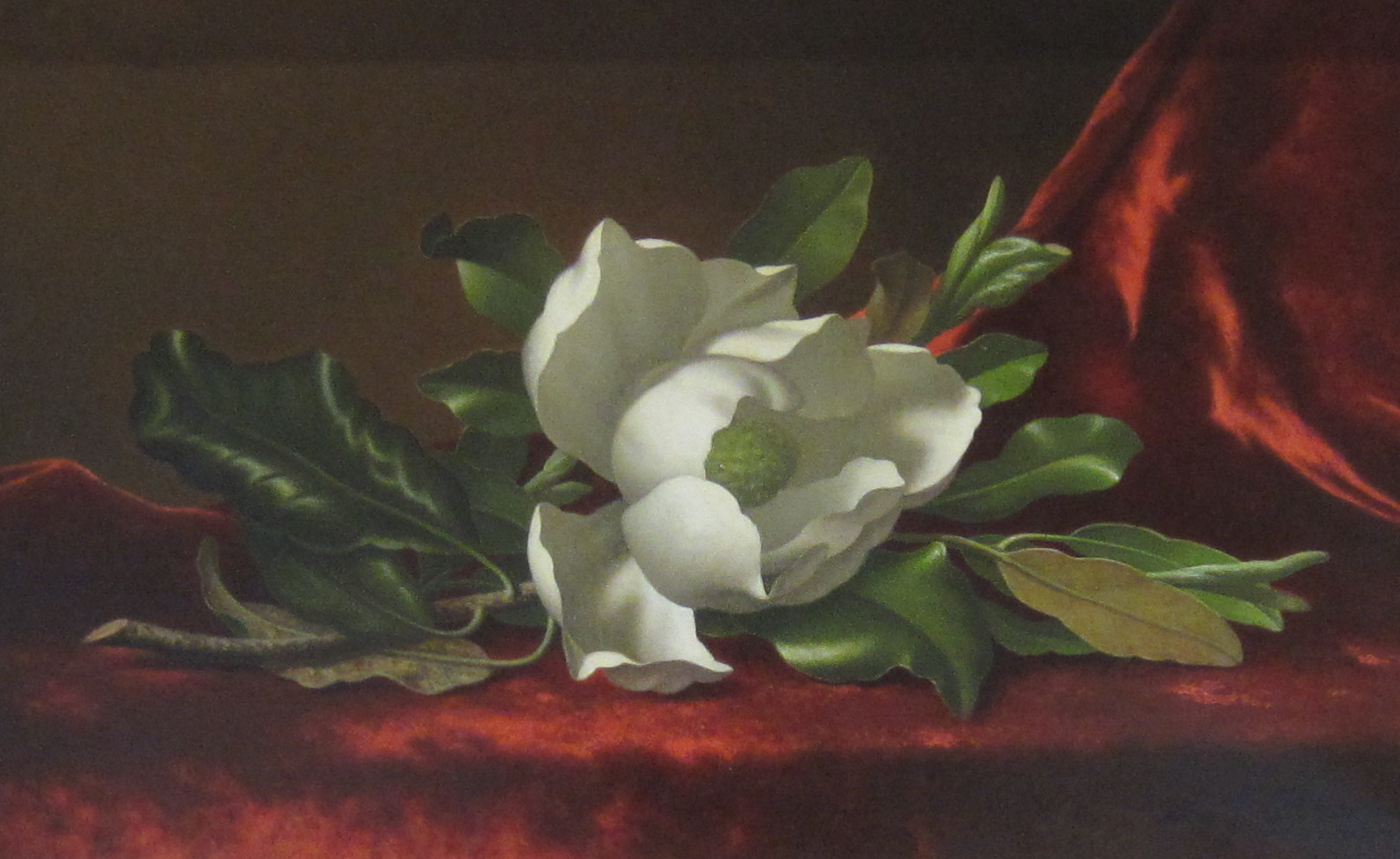
- Artist: Martin Johnson Heade
- Year: 1888
- Medium: Oil on canvas
- Dimensions: 38.4 cm × 61.3 cm (15.1 in × 24.1 in)
- Location: Timken Museum of Art, San Diego

The Magnolia Blossom is an oil painting on canvas by the American artist Martin Johnson Heade, from 1888. It is held at the Timken Museum of Art, in San Diego.

It depicts a magnolia flower, with her green leaves, and with a brown background, laid upon a red cloth in a table.
