= Cattleya Orchid and Three Hummingbirds =

Painting by Martin Johnson Heade

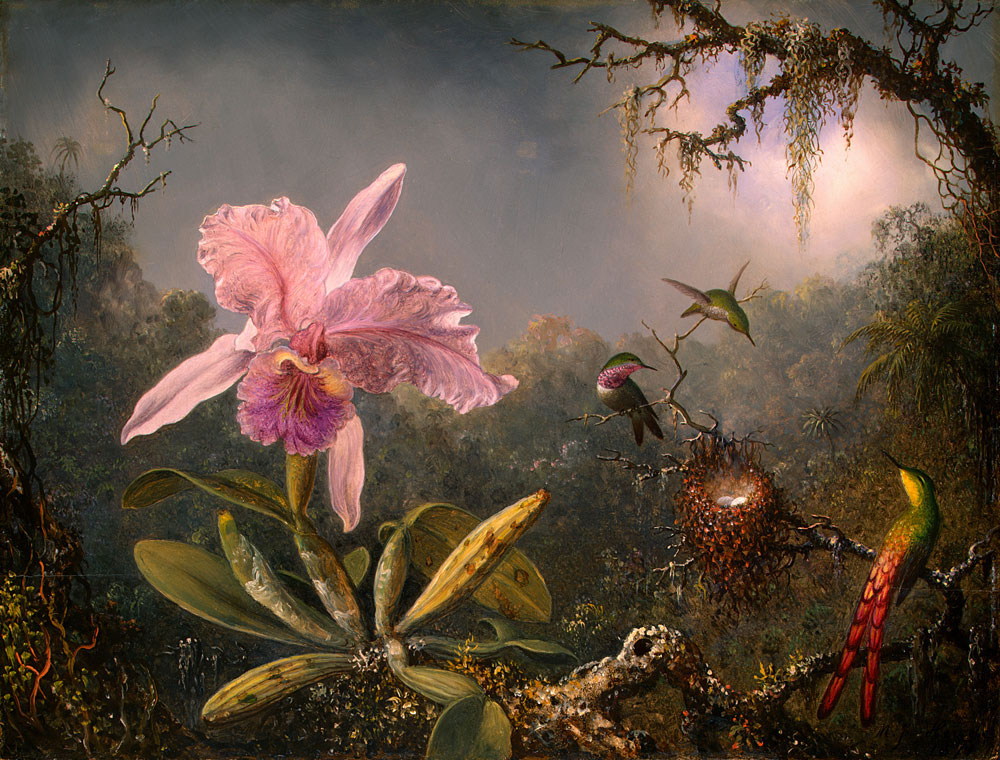
- Artist: Martin Johnson Heade
- Year: 1871
- Medium: oil on mahogany panel
- Dimensions: 34.8 cm × 45.6 cm (13.7 in × 18.0 in)
- Location: National Gallery of Art, Washington, D.C.

Cattleya Orchid and Three Hummingbirds is an oil-on-mahogany-panel painting by the American artist Martin Johnson Heade, from 1871. It is now in the National Gallery of Art, in Washington, D.C., which acquired it in 1982.

== Description ==
Inspired perhaps by the works of Charles Darwin and Frederic Edwin Church, Heade planned to produce a deluxe book in the 1860s depicting Brazilian hummingbirds in tropical settings, and, to that end, created a series of 40 small pictures called The Gems of Brazil. The project was abandoned, but Heade retained his interest in hummingbirds and continued to paint them in combination with orchids and jungle backgrounds through the 1870s.

The National Gallery of Art describes the work: "Lichen covers dead branches; moss drips from trees; and, a blue-gray mist veils the distant jungle. An opulent pink orchid with light-green stems and pods dominates the left foreground." On the right, two green-and-pink Brazilian Amethysts hover about a nest while a red-tailed Sappho Comet perches nearby.
