= Martin Johnson Heade =

American painter (1819–1904)

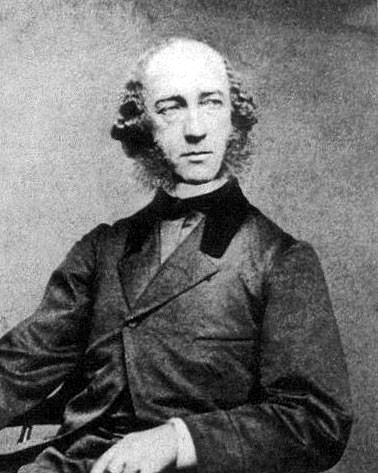
- Martin Johnson Heade
- Born: August 11, 1819; Lumberville, Pennsylvania, U.S.
- Died: September 4, 1904 (aged 85); St. Augustine, Florida, U.S.
- Known for: Painting, landscape art, still life
- Notable work: Cattleya Orchid and Three Hummingbirds; Sunlight and Shadow: The Newbury Marshes; Giant Magnolias on a Blue Velvet Cloth
- Movement: Hudson River School (occasionally disputed); Luminism
- Patrons: Henry Morrison Flagler

Martin Johnson Heade (August 11, 1819 – September 4, 1904) was an American painter known for his salt marsh landscapes, seascapes, and depictions of hummingbirds, often depicted with orchids, as well as lotus blossoms and other still lifes. His painting style and subject matter, while derived from the romanticism of the time, are regarded by art historians as a significant departure from those of his peers.

Heade was born in Lumberville, Pennsylvania, the son of a storekeeper. He studied with Edward Hicks, and possibly with Thomas Hicks. His earliest works were produced during the 1840s and were chiefly portraits. He travelled to Europe several times as a young man, became an itinerant artist on American shores, and exhibited in Philadelphia in 1841 and New York in 1843. Friendships with artists of the Hudson River School led to an interest in landscape art. In 1863, he planned to publish a volume of Brazilian hummingbirds and tropical flowers, but the project was eventually abandoned. He travelled to the tropics several times thereafter, and continued to paint birds and flowers. Heade married in 1883 and moved to St. Augustine, Florida. His chief works from this period were Floridian landscapes and flowers, particularly magnolias laid upon velvet cloth. His best known works are depictions of light and shadow upon the salt marshes of New England.

Heade was not a widely known artist during his lifetime, but his work attracted the notice of scholars, art historians, and collectors during the 1940s. He quickly became recognized as a major American artist. Although he was often considered a Hudson River School artist, some critics and scholars take exception to this categorization. Heade's works are now in major museums and collections. His paintings are occasionally discovered in unlikely places such as garage sales and flea markets.

== Childhood and early career ==
Heade was born in 1819 and was raised in Lumberville, Pennsylvania. Lumberville was a small hamlet, along the Delaware River in Bucks County, Pennsylvania. Until the mid-1850s, his family ran what is now called the Lumberville Store and Post Office, the village's sole general store. The family spelling of the name was Heed.

Heade received his first art training from the folk artist Edward Hicks, who lived in nearby Newtown, and possibly also from Edward's cousin, Thomas Hicks. Heade was painting by 1839; his earliest known work is a portrait from that year. He traveled abroad and lived in Rome for two years. He first exhibited his work in 1841, at the Pennsylvania Academy of the Fine Arts in Philadelphia, and again in 1843 at the National Academy of Design in New York. Heade began exhibiting regularly in 1848, after another trip to Europe, and became an itinerant artist until he settled in New York in 1859.

== Transition to landscape painting ==
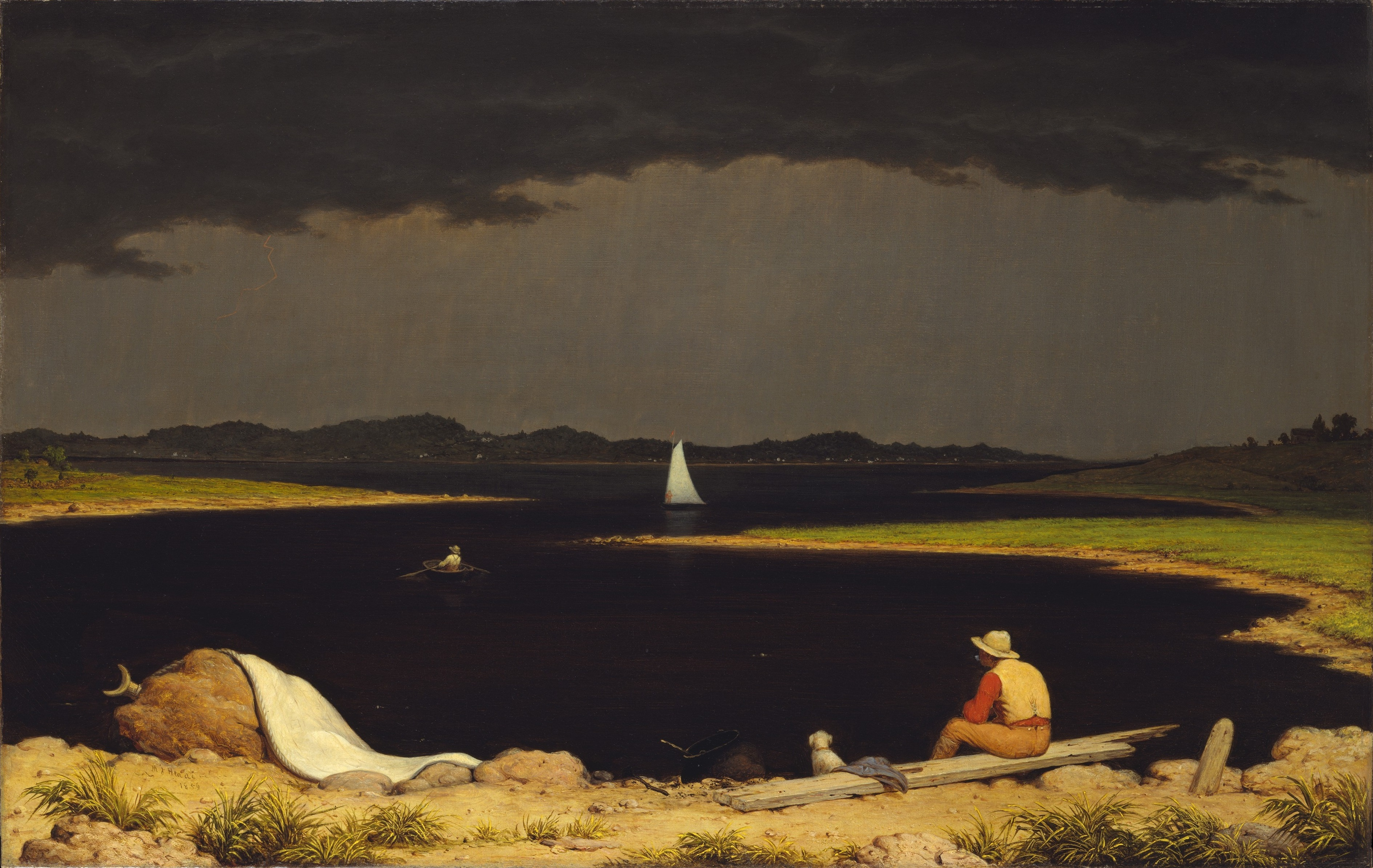
Approaching Thunder Storm, Narragansett Bay, Rhode Island, 1859, Metropolitan Museum of Art

Around 1857 Heade became interested in landscape painting, partly by meeting the established artists John Frederick Kensett and Benjamin Champney in the White Mountains of New Hampshire. Heade moved to New York City and took a studio in the Tenth Street Studio Building, which housed many of the famous Hudson River School artists of the time, such as Albert Bierstadt, Sanford Gifford, and Frederic Edwin Church. He became socially and professionally acquainted with them, and struck up a particularly close friendship with Church. Landscapes would ultimately form a third of Heade's total oeuvre.

== Tropical subjects ==
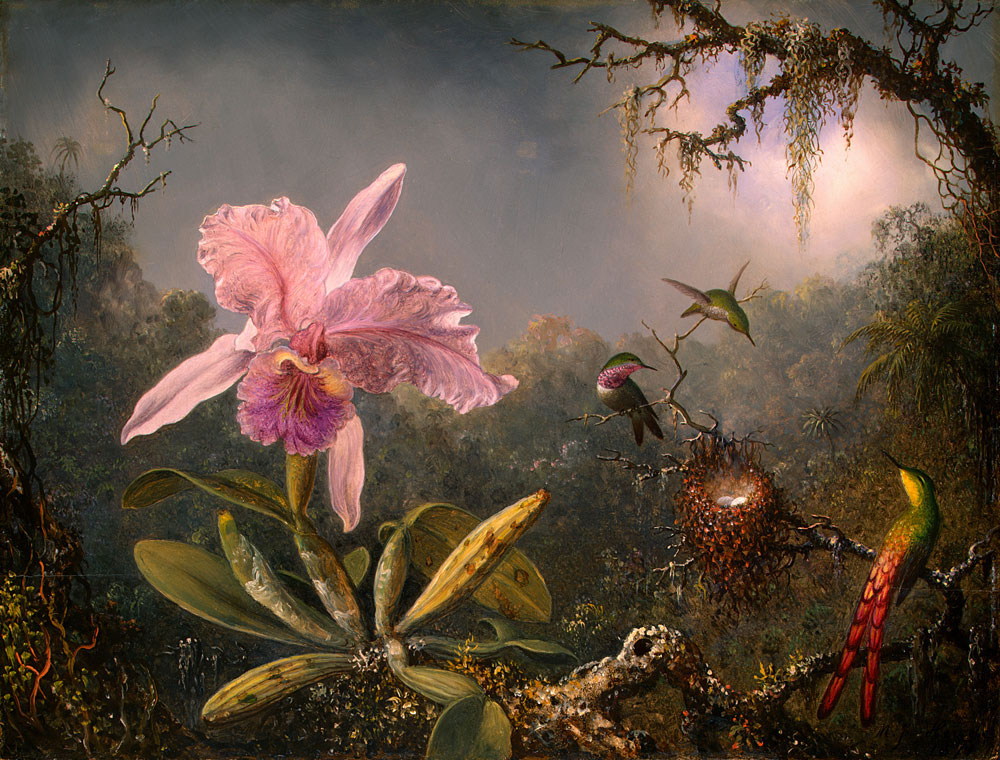
Cattleya Orchid and Three Hummingbirds, 1871

Heade's interest in the tropics was piqued at least partly by the impact of Church's monumental painting Heart of the Andes (1859), now in the collection of the Metropolitan Museum of Art. Heade travelled in Brazil from 1863 to 1864, where he painted an extensive series of small works, eventually numbering over forty, depicting hummingbirds. He intended the series for a planned book titled "The Gems of Brazil", but the book was never published due to financial difficulty and Heade's concerns about the quality of the reproductions. Heade nevertheless returned to the tropics twice, in 1866 journeying to Nicaragua, and in 1870 to Colombia, Panama, and Jamaica. He continued to paint romantic works of tropical birds and lush foliage into his late career.

== Salt marsh scenes ==
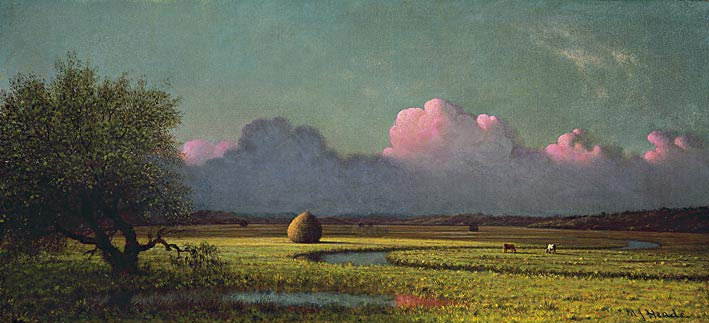
Sunlight and Shadow: The Newbury Marshes, 1871–1875

Heade's primary interest in landscape, and the works for which he is perhaps best known today, was the New England coastal salt marsh. Contrary to typical Hudson River School displays of scenic mountains, valleys, and waterfalls, Heade's marsh landscapes avoided depictions of grandeur. They focused instead on the horizontal expanse of subdued scenery, and employed repeating motifs that included small haystacks and diminutive figures. Heade also concentrated on the depiction of light and atmosphere in his marsh scenes. These and similar works have led some historians to characterize Heade as a luminist painter. In 1883, Heade moved to St. Augustine, Florida, and took as his primary landscape subject the surrounding subtropical marshland.

== Later life and still lifes ==
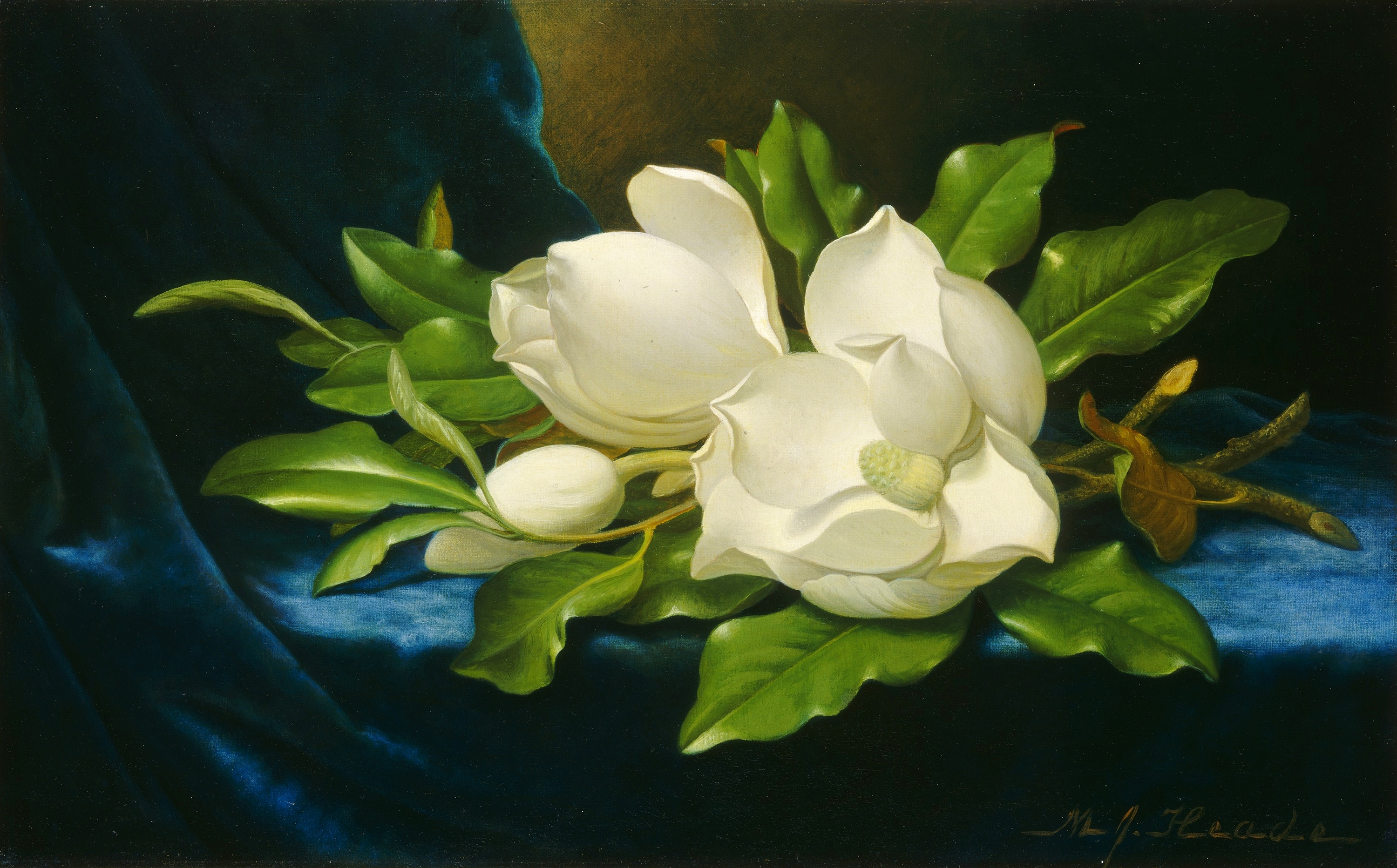
Giant Magnolias on a Blue Velvet Cloth, 1890

Heade married and moved to St. Augustine, Florida, in 1883. He remained there and continued to paint until his death in 1904. During his later years in St. Augustine, Heade painted numerous still lifes of southern flowers, especially magnolia blossoms laid on velvet. This was a continuation of an interest in still life that Heade had developed since the 1860s. His earlier works in this genre typically depict a display of flowers arranged in an ornate vase of small or medium size on a cloth-covered table. Heade was the only 19th-century American artist to create such an extensive body of work in both still life and landscape.

Heade died in St. Augustine in 1904.

== Heade and the Hudson River School ==
Art historians have come to disagree with the common view that Heade is a Hudson River School painter, a view given wide currency by Heade's inclusion in a landmark exhibition of Hudson River School landscapes at the Metropolitan Museum of Art in 1987.

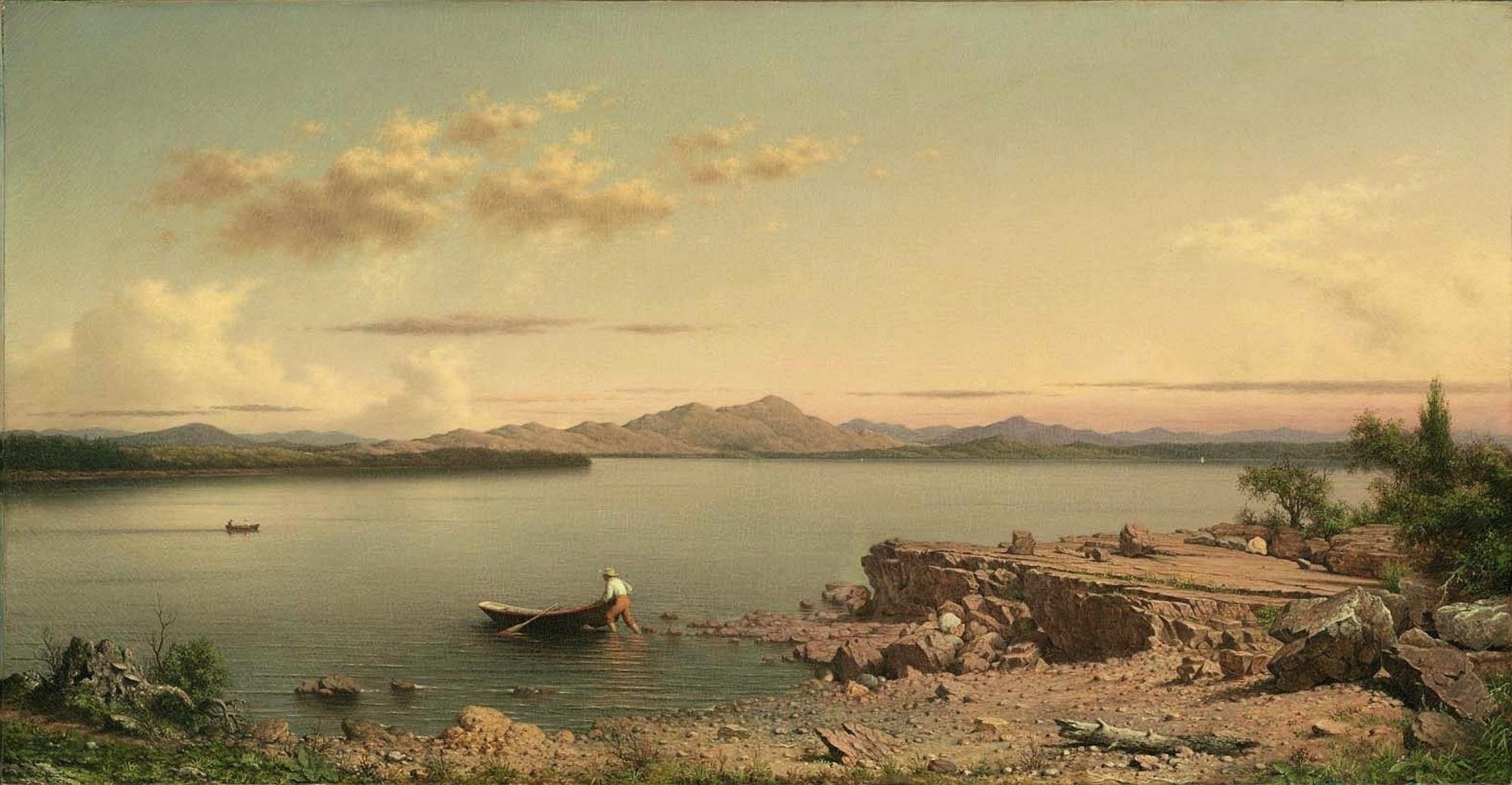
Lake George, 1862

The leading Heade scholar and author of Heade's catalogue raisonné, Theodore E. Stebbins, Jr., wrote some years after the 1987 exhibition, "Other scholars—myself included—have increasingly come to doubt that Heade is most usefully seen as standing within that school."

According to the Heade catalogue raisonné, only around 40 percent of his paintings were landscapes. The remaining majority were still lifes, paintings of birds, and portraits, subjects unrelated to the Hudson River School. Of Heade's landscapes, perhaps only 25 percent had traditional Hudson River School subject matter.

Heade had less interest in topographically accurate views than the Hudson River painters, and instead focused on mood and the effects of light. Stebbins wrote, "If the paintings of the shore as well as the more conventional compositions...might lead one to think of Heade as a Hudson River School painter, the [marsh scenes] make it clear that he was not."

== Legacy and collections ==
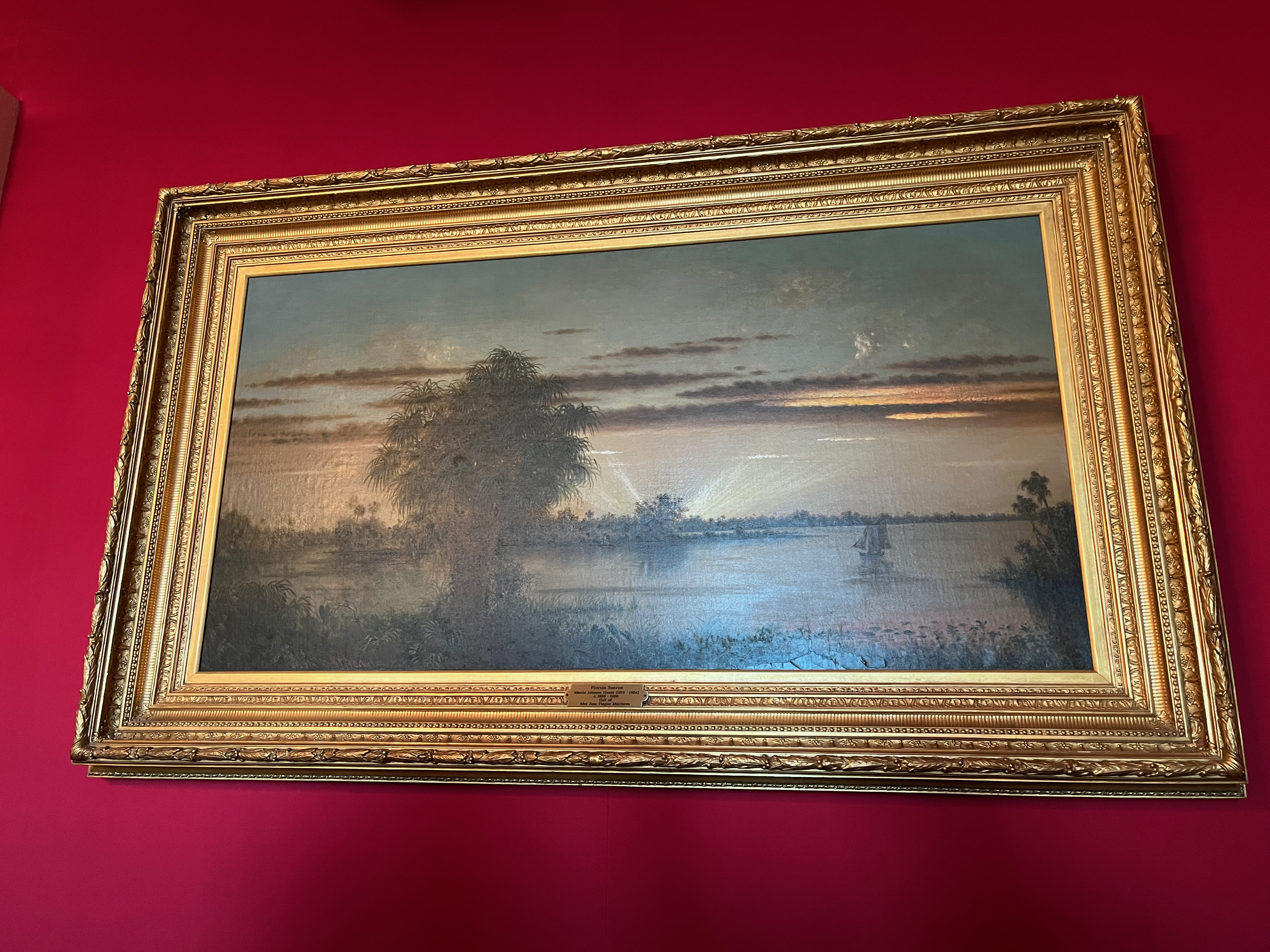
Florida Sunrise on display in the Red Room of the White House

Heade was not a famous artist during his time, and for much of the first part of the 20th century was nearly forgotten. A re-awakening of interest in 19th-century American art around World War II sparked new appreciation of his work. Heade's work in particular received critical attention with the exhibition in 1943 of his painting Thunderstorm On Narragansett Bay (1868), as part of the show "Romantic Painting in America" at the Museum of Modern Art. Art historians have come to consider him one of the most important American artists of his generation. His work has inspired contemporary artists such as Renee McGinnis, David Bierk and Ian Hornak.

His works are in most major American museums, including the Museum of Fine Arts in Boston, Massachusetts, which owns the largest amount of his works, including about 30 paintings as well as numerous drawings and sketchbooks, the Metropolitan Museum of Art in New York City and the National Gallery of Art in Washington, D.C.

In 1955, Robert McIntyre, art historian and director of the Macbeth Gallery, donated a cache of Heade's personal papers to the Archives of American Art, part of the Smithsonian Institution. These papers included, among other things, Heade's sketchbook, notes, and letters from his friend and fellow artist Frederic Edwin Church. In 2007, these papers were digitized and made accessible on the Web.

In 1999 and 2000, Heade was the subject of a major exhibition Martin Johnson Heade organized by Theodore E. Stebbins, Jr. It traveled from the Museum of Fine Arts in Boston to the National Gallery of Art in Washington, ending at the Los Angeles County Museum of Art.

In 2004, Heade was honored with a stamp from the U.S. Postal Service featuring his 1890 oil-on-canvas painting, "Giant Magnolias on a Blue Velvet Cloth." As Stebbins notes in his writings, Heade's work has also been copied and forged extensively. Since Heade was not popular during his lifetime, there were few contemporaries who emulated his work. 20th century copies are therefore readily apparent as fakes, since it takes oil paint decades to dry out and harden.

=== Discoveries of works by Heade ===
Theodore Stebbins, Jr., now curator of American art at the Harvard University Art Museums, writes, "...one of the things that has always made the study of Heade's work exciting is the way his paintings continue to turn up in garage sales and other unlikely places all over the country, in a manner that the paintings of Frederic E. Church and John F. Kensett do not." Stebbins speculates the reason for this was Heade's popularity with middle-class buyers, and his willingness to distribute his works widely across the country. Among the more notable of Heade's discoveries are:

- Thunderstorm on Narragansett Bay, now in the collection of the Amon Carter Museum of American Art, Fort Worth, Texas, was originally discovered in an antiques store in Larchmont, New York, in 1943 by NYC art dealer Victor Spark.
- Magnolia Blossoms on Blue Velvet and Cherokee Roses, now in private collections, were purchased at an estate sale in Arizona for $60 in 1996. They sold at Christie's auction house later that year for $937,500 and $134,500 respectively.
- Two Magnolias on Blue Plush was originally purchased for $29 at a rummage sale by a Wisconsin man in 1989. It sold at Christie's auction house in 1999 for $882,500. It is now in the collection of James W. McGlothlin of Bristol, Virginia.
- Magnolias on Gold Velvet Cloth was used to cover a hole in the wall of an Indiana resident for years. The owner became curious about the value of the painting after playing an art-related board game, and verified its authenticity with a New York art gallery. The Museum of Fine Arts in Houston purchased the work for $1,250,000 in 1999.
- An unnamed Heade salt marsh landscape now titled "River Scene" was discovered in the attic of a Boston-area resident in 2003. It sold at a local auction house to an art dealer for $1,006,250 and was featured on the PBS television show, "Find!". It was purchased by a private collector, and is now on view at the Fogg Art Museum in Cambridge, Massachusetts.
- In 2004 a Florida woman was informed of the Heade discovery featured on "Find!" by her son, and inquired about a small 6 by 12 inch landscape that had hung in her living room. The painting, which her late husband had purchased for several dollars in St. Augustine in the 1970s, was authenticated as a late Heade marsh landscape. It sold at auction to an art dealer for $218,500.
- A painting was found in a Massachusetts attic in 2006 and consigned to a local auction in Fall River. The painting was authenticated by Dr. Theodore Stebbins, Jr. as a Heade, having been painted between 1883 and 1890 in St. Augustine, Florida. It sold for $198,000 on November 22, 2006.

=== Fakes ===
On the other hand, an unknown number of Heade's were faked. In 2012, Ken Perenyi (born 1947) disclosed in his book, Caveat Emptor how he forged numerous works purporting to be by Heade and other American masters. He avoided prosecution because he published his book after the statute of limitations had elapsed.

== Works ==
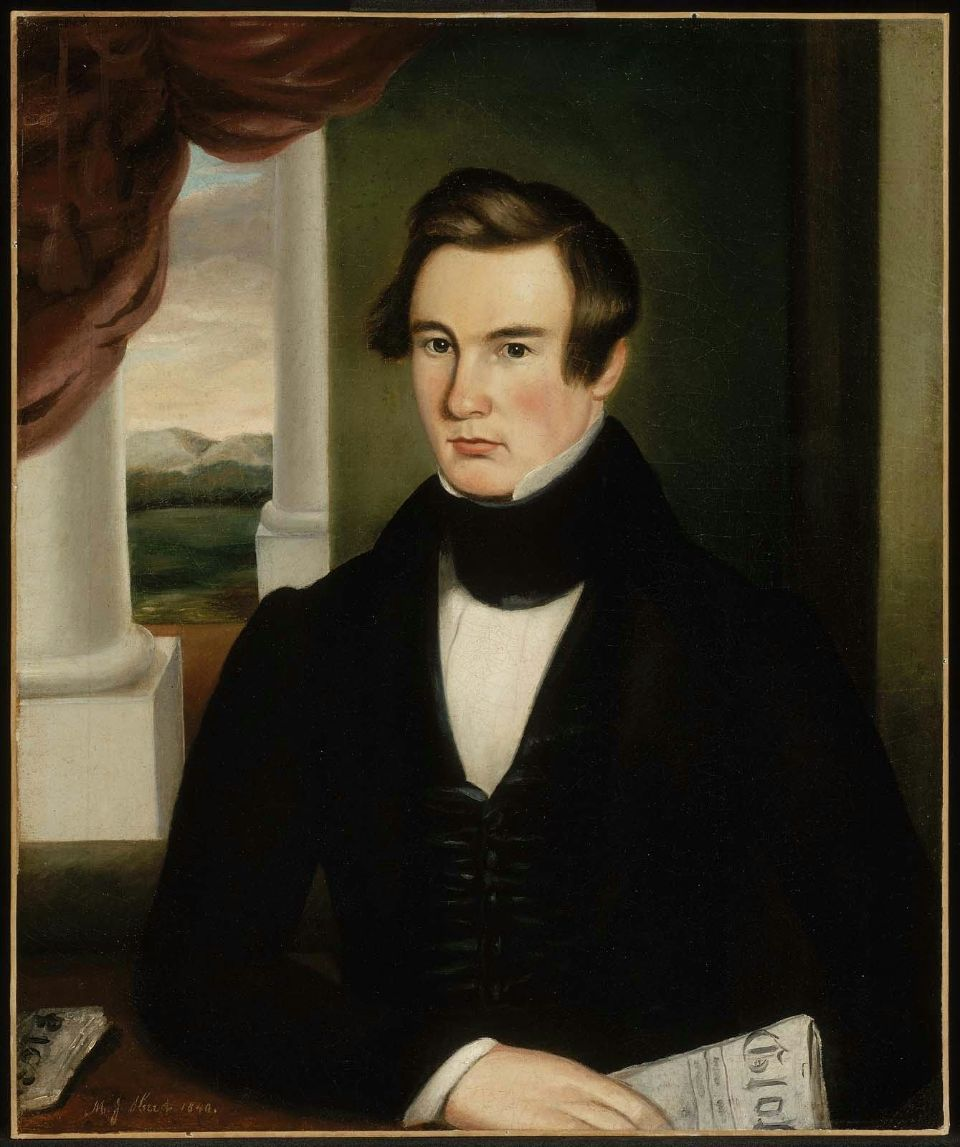
Portrait of a Man, 1840, Boston Museum of Fine Arts

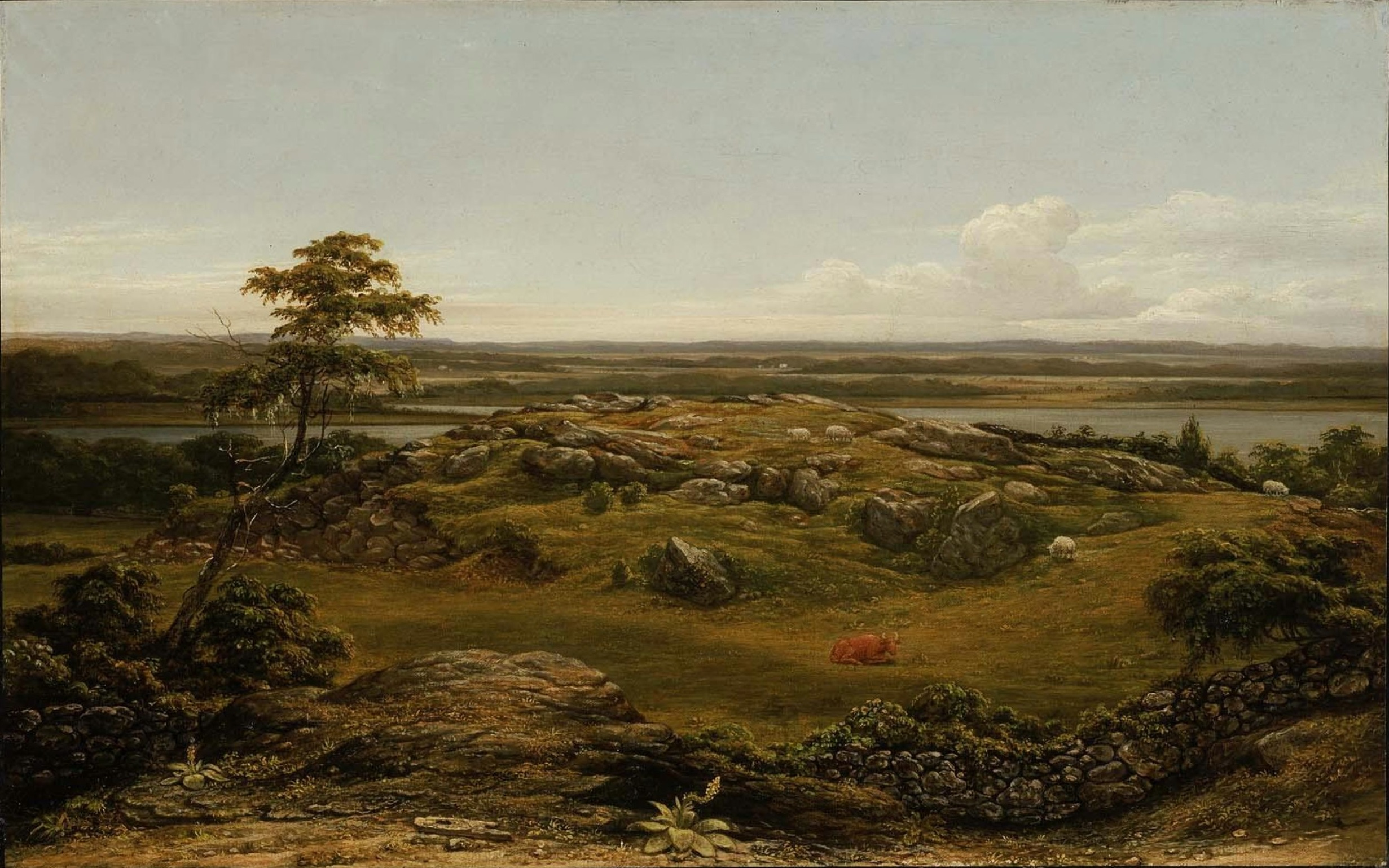
Rocks in New England, 1855, Boston Museum of Fine Arts

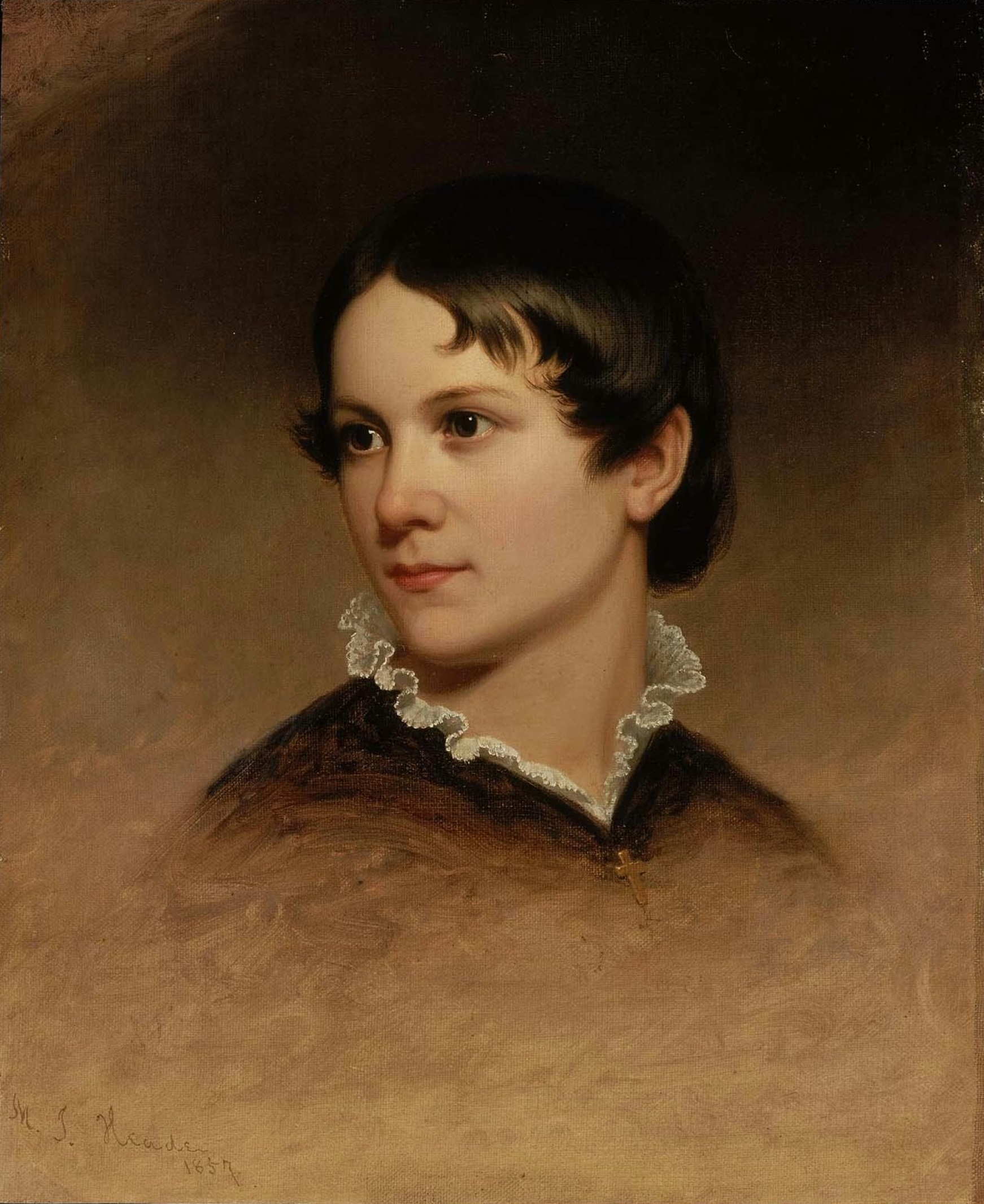
Mary Rebecca Clark, 1857, Boston Museum of Fine Arts

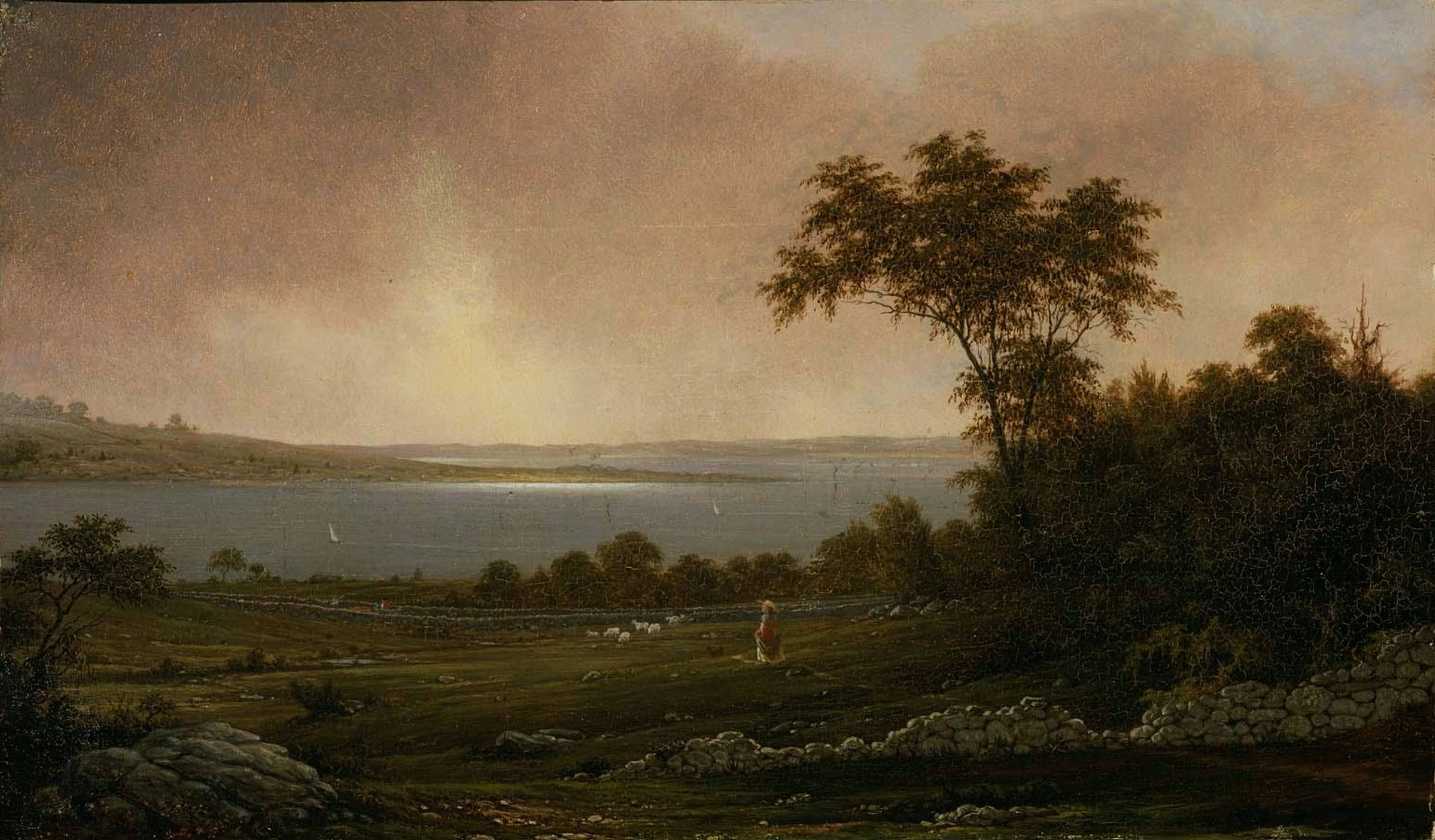
Rhode Island Landscape, 1859, Boston Museum of Fine Arts

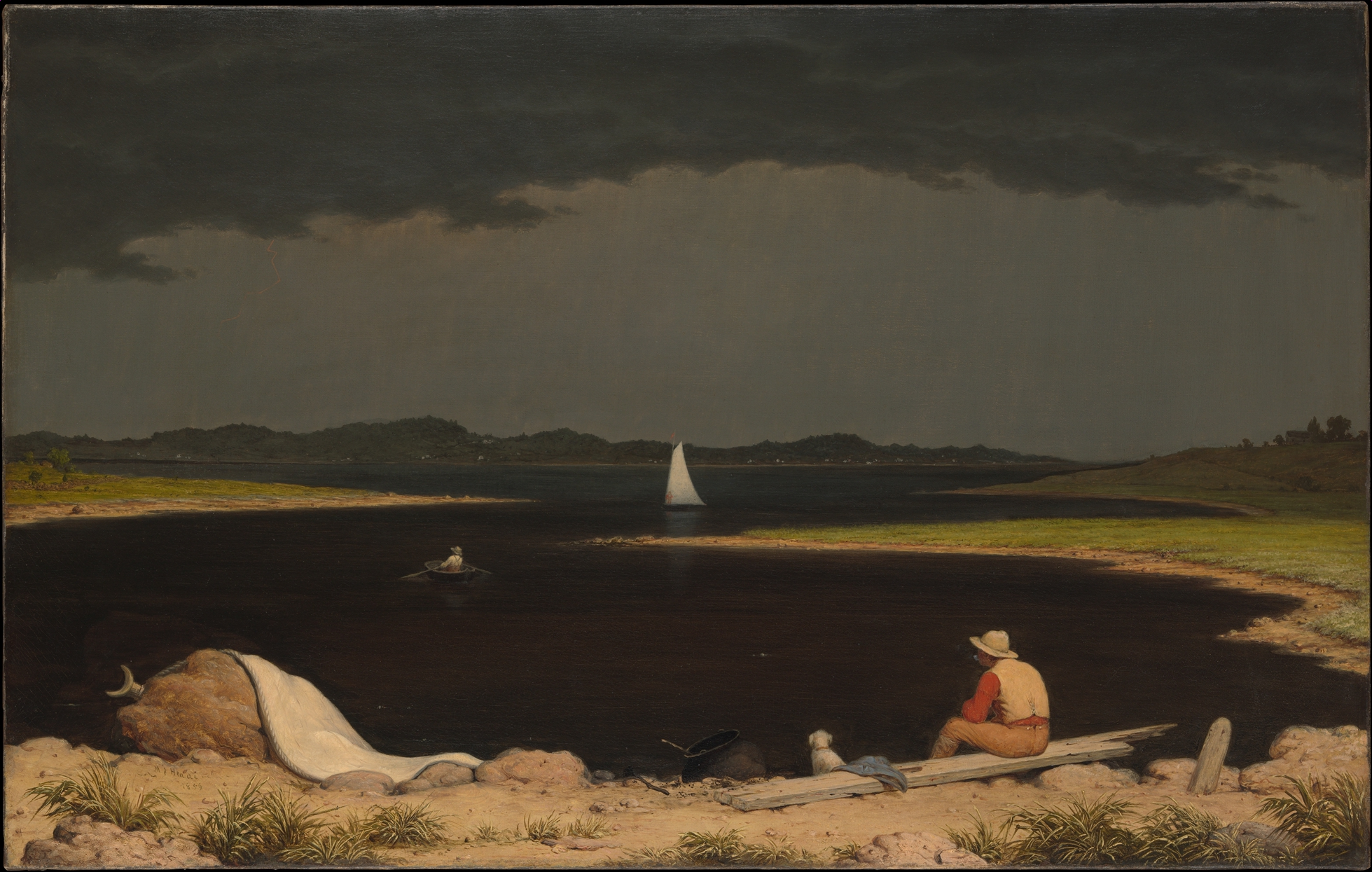
Approaching Thunder Storm, 1859, Metropolitan Museum of Art

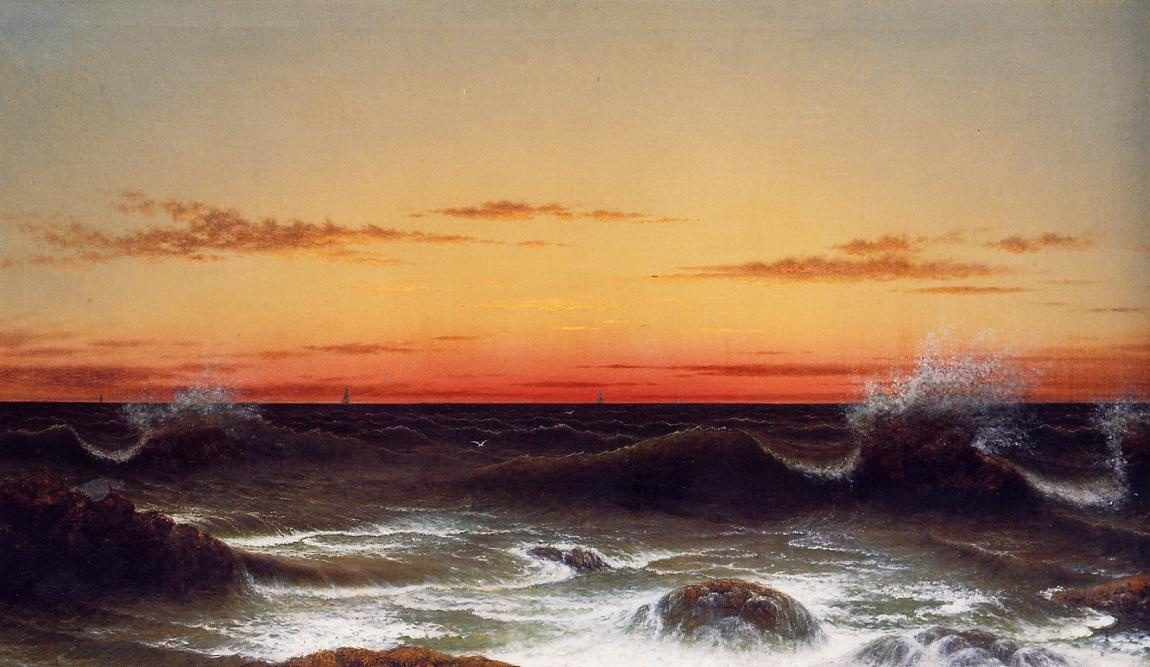
Seascape: Sunset, 1861, Detroit Institute of Arts

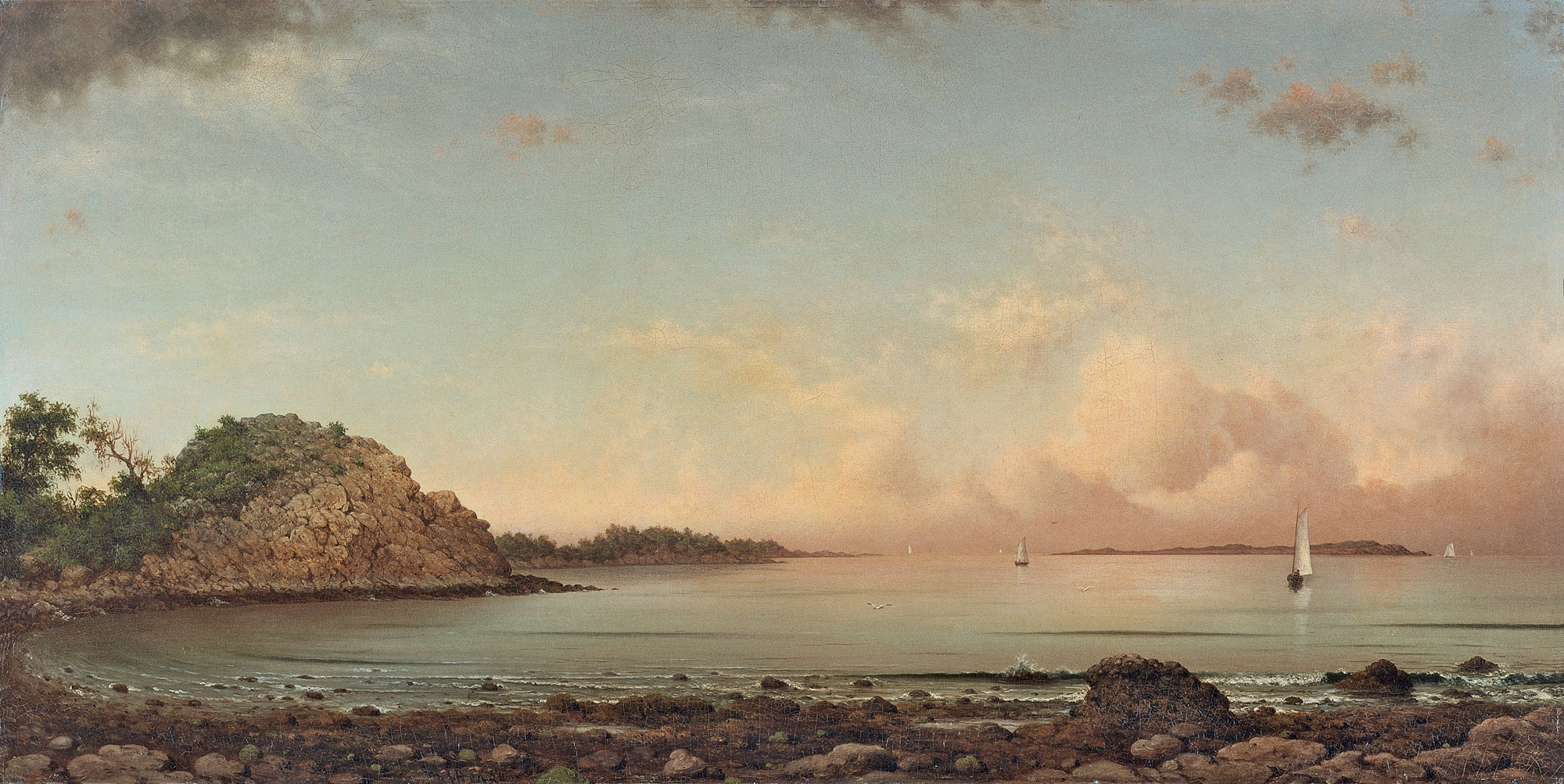
Singing Beach, Manchester, 1862, Thyssen-Bornemisza Museum

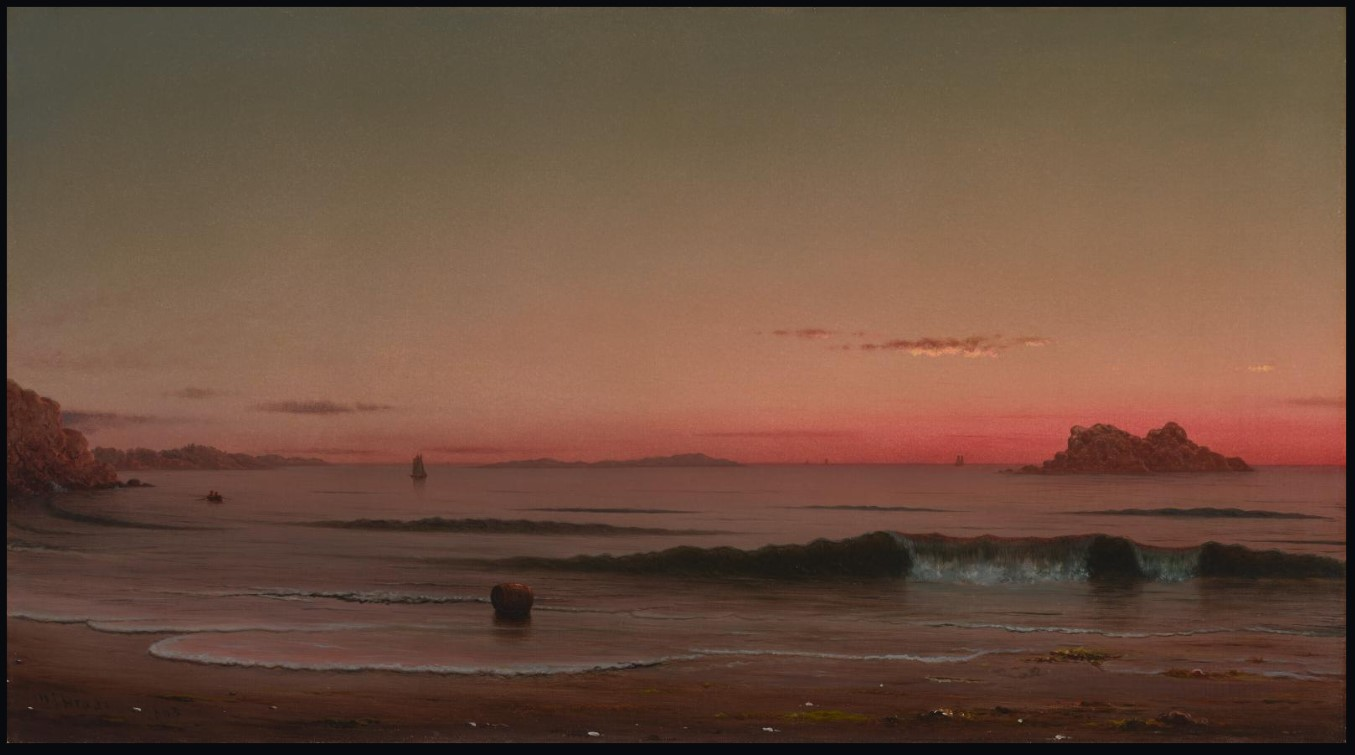
Singing Beach, Manchester, Machassusetts, 1863, de Young (Fine Arts Museums of San Francisco)

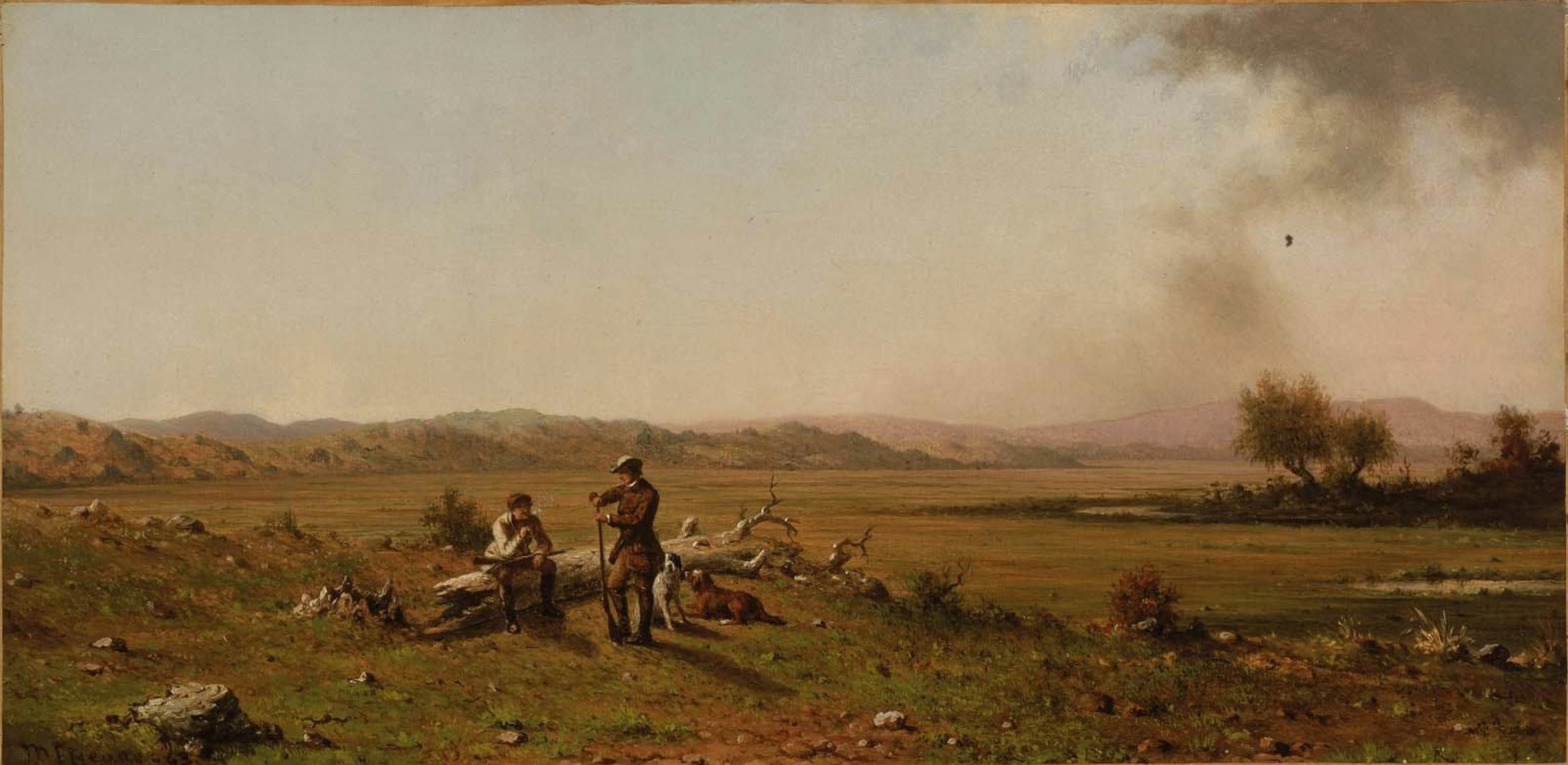
Hunters Resting, 1863, Boston Museum of Fine Art

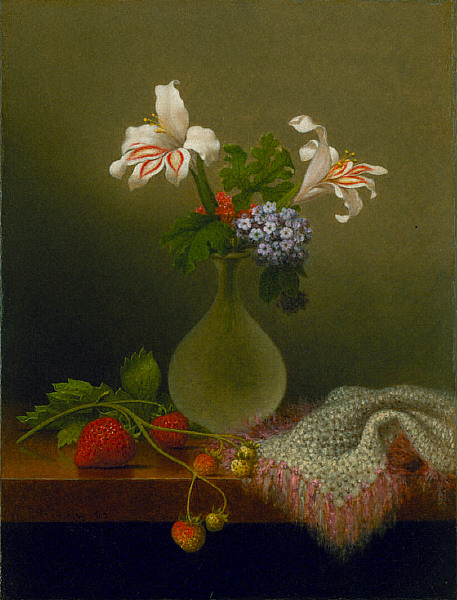
A Vase of Corn Lilies and Heliotrope, 1863, Saint Louis Art Museum

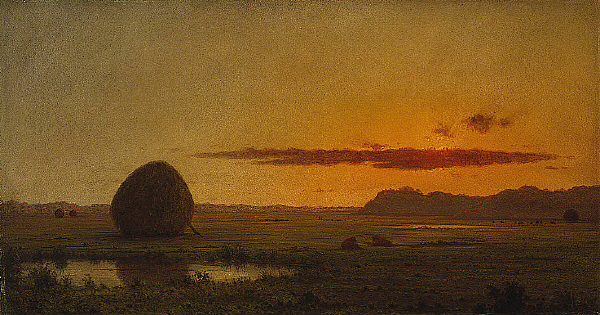
Sunset, Newburyport Meadows, 1863, Saint Louis Art Museum

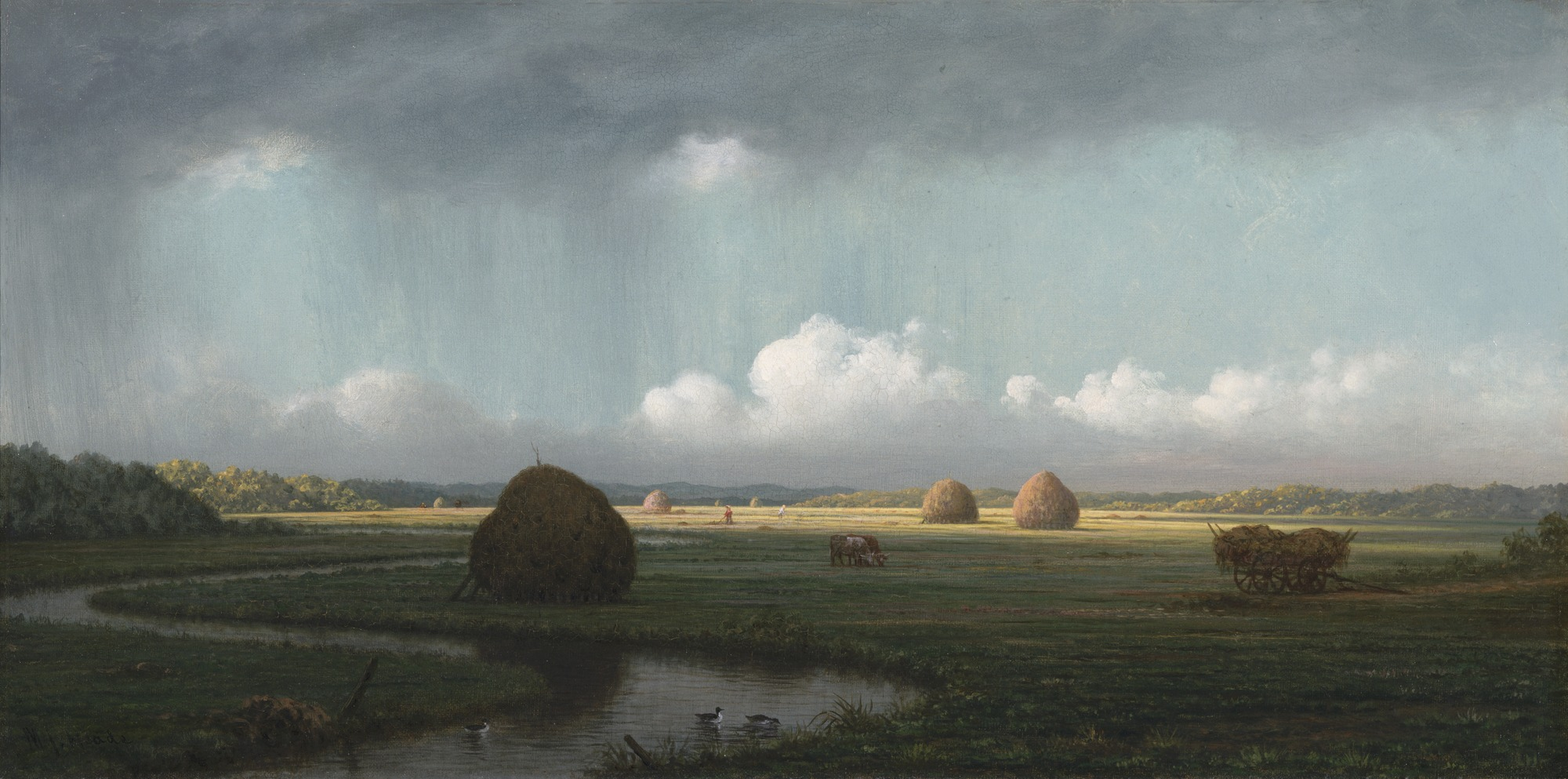
Sudden Showers, Newbury Marshes, c. 1865–1875, Yale University Art Gallery

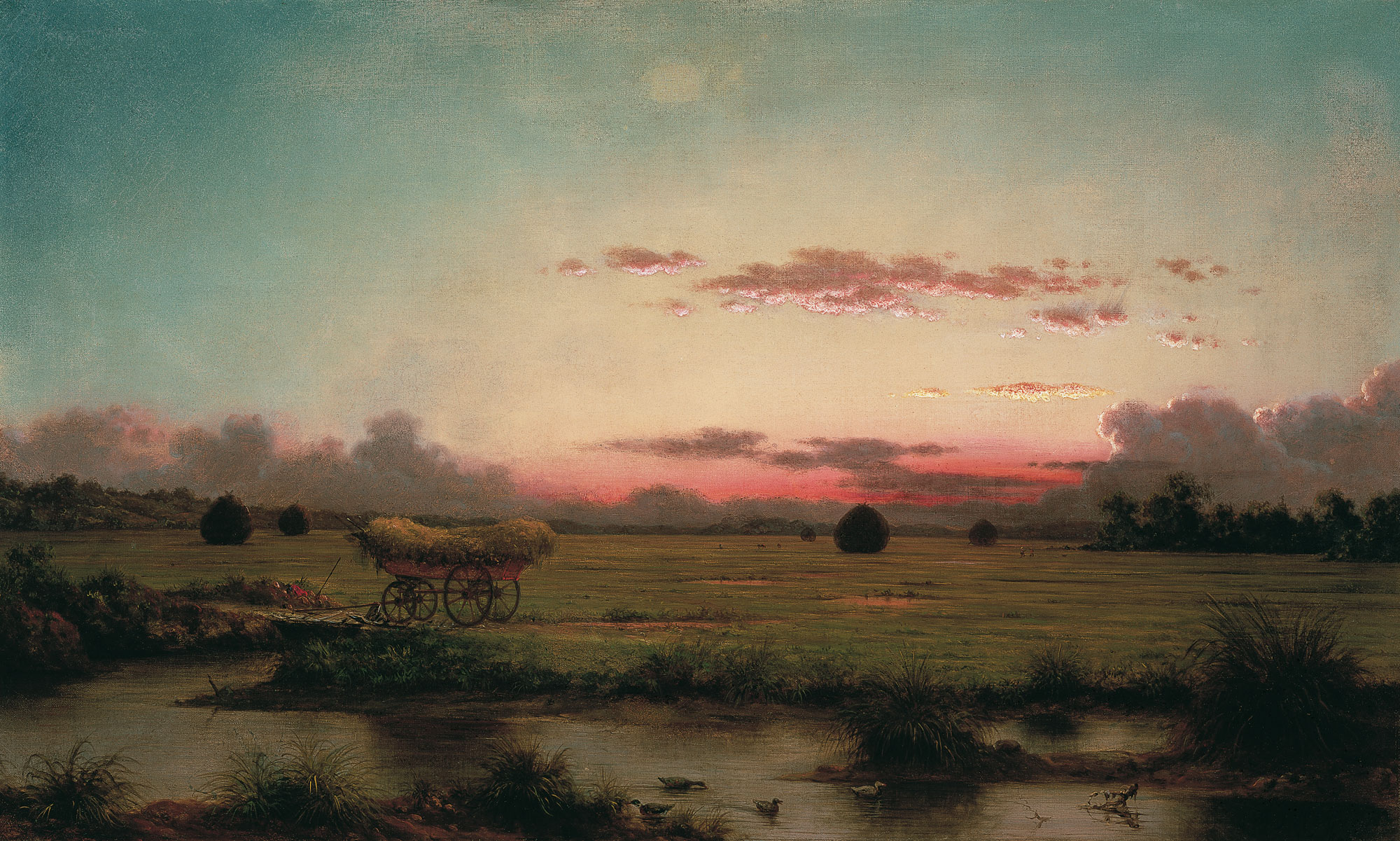
The Marshes at Rhode Island, 1866, Thyssen-Bornemisza Museum

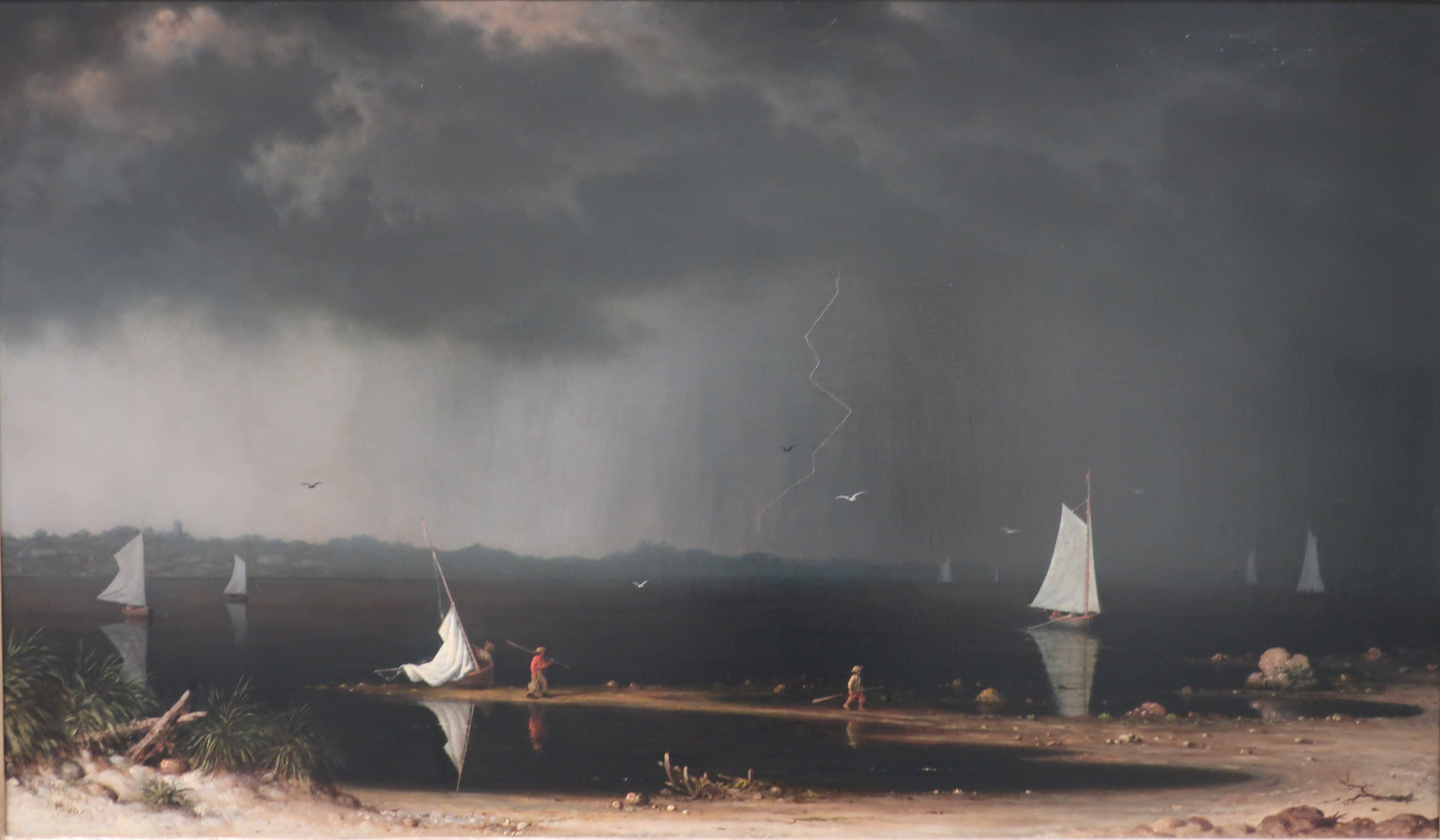
Thunder Storm on Narragansett Bay, 1868, Amon Carter Museum of American Art

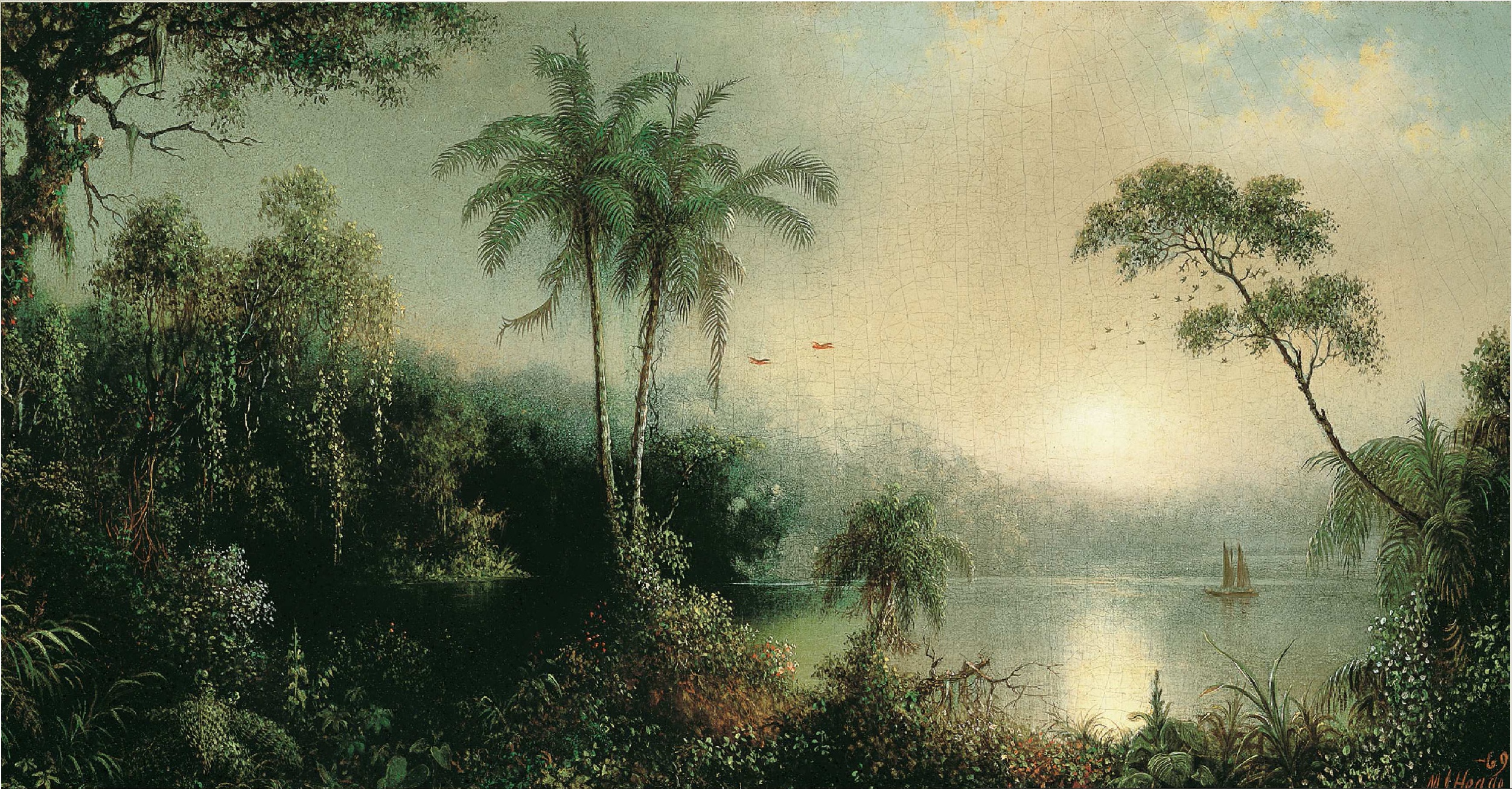
Sunrise in Nicaragua, 1869, Thyssen-Bornemisza Museum

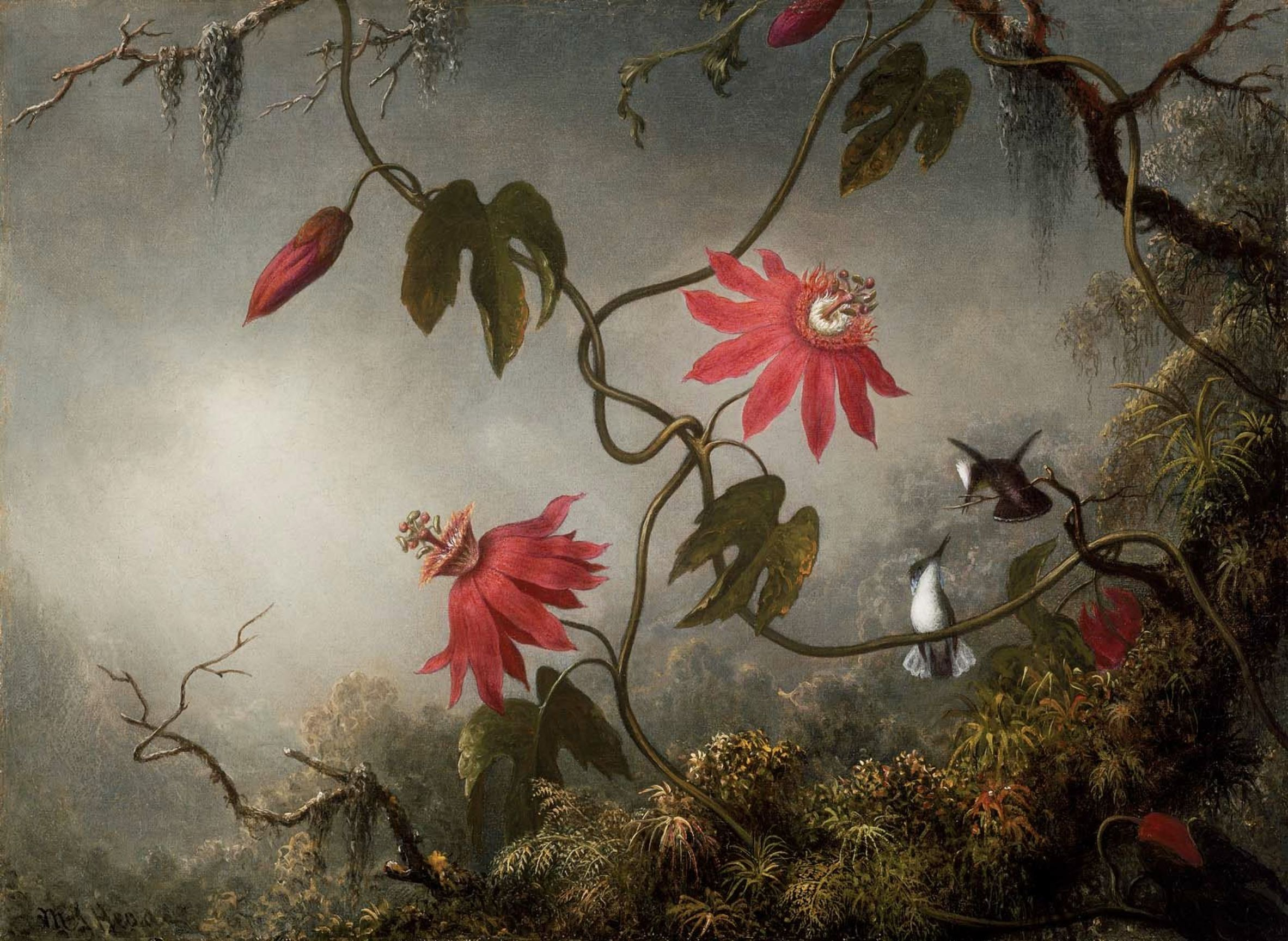
Passion Flowers with Hummingbirds, c. 1870–1883, Boston Museum of Fine Arts

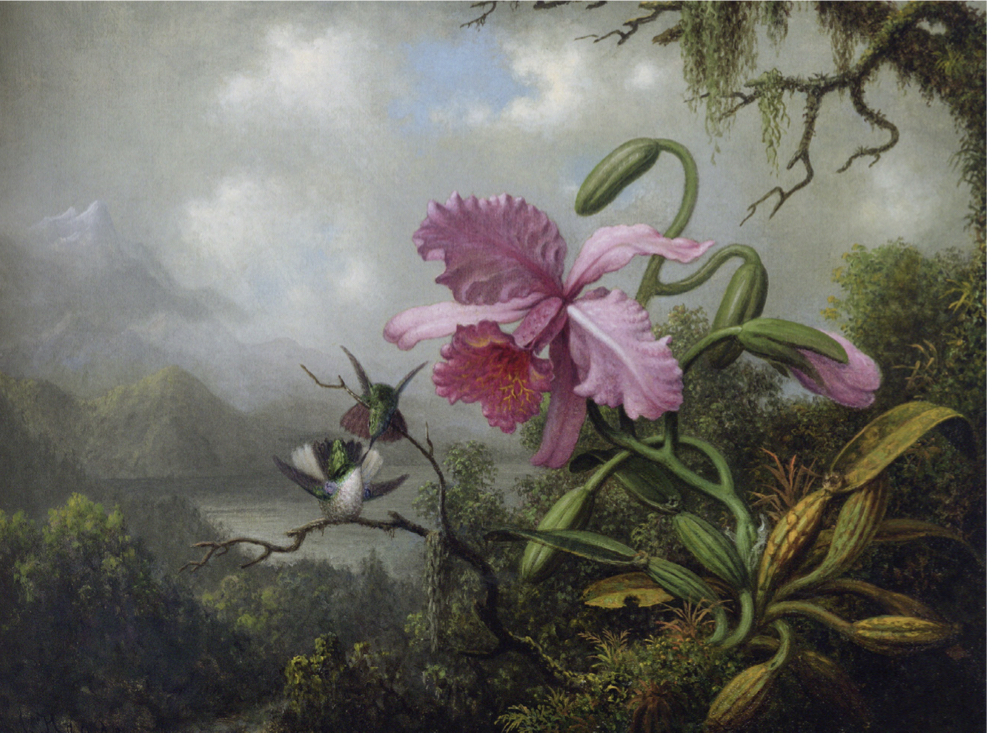
Orchid and Hummingbirds near a Mountain Lake, c. 1870–1890, McMullen Museum of Art

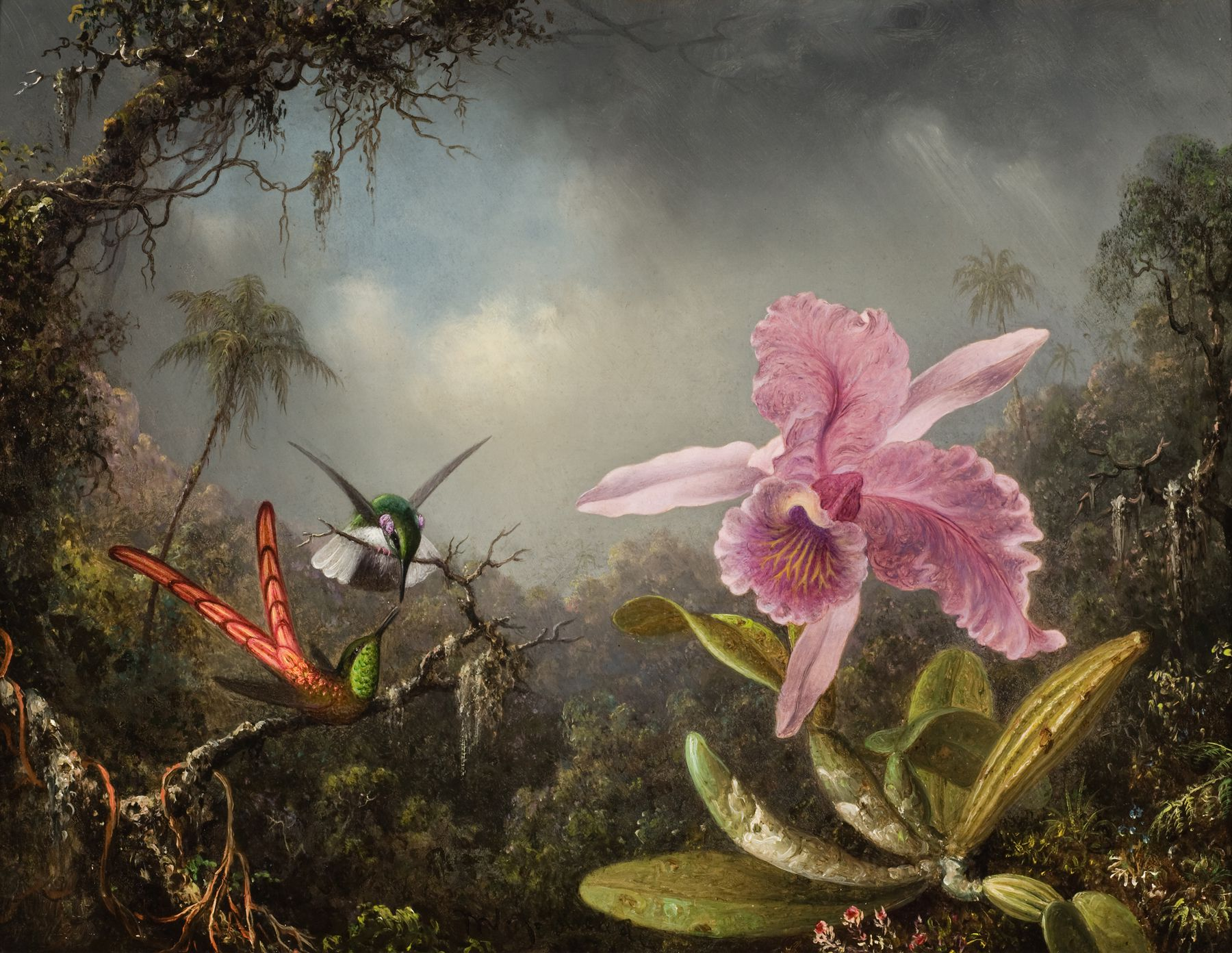
Orchid with Two Hummingbirds, 1871, Reynolda House Museum of American Art

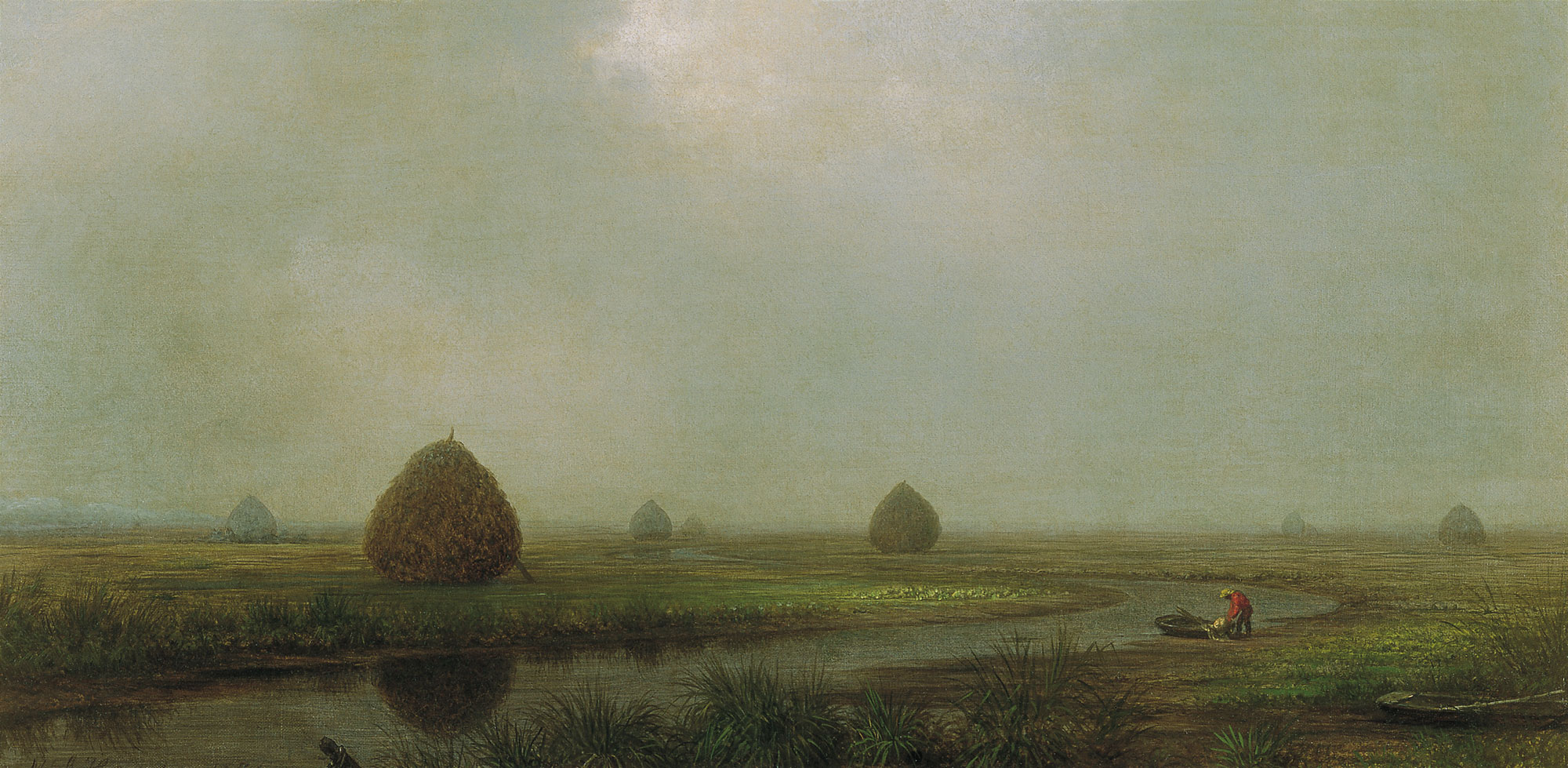
Jersey Marshes, 1874, Thyssen-Bornemisza Museum

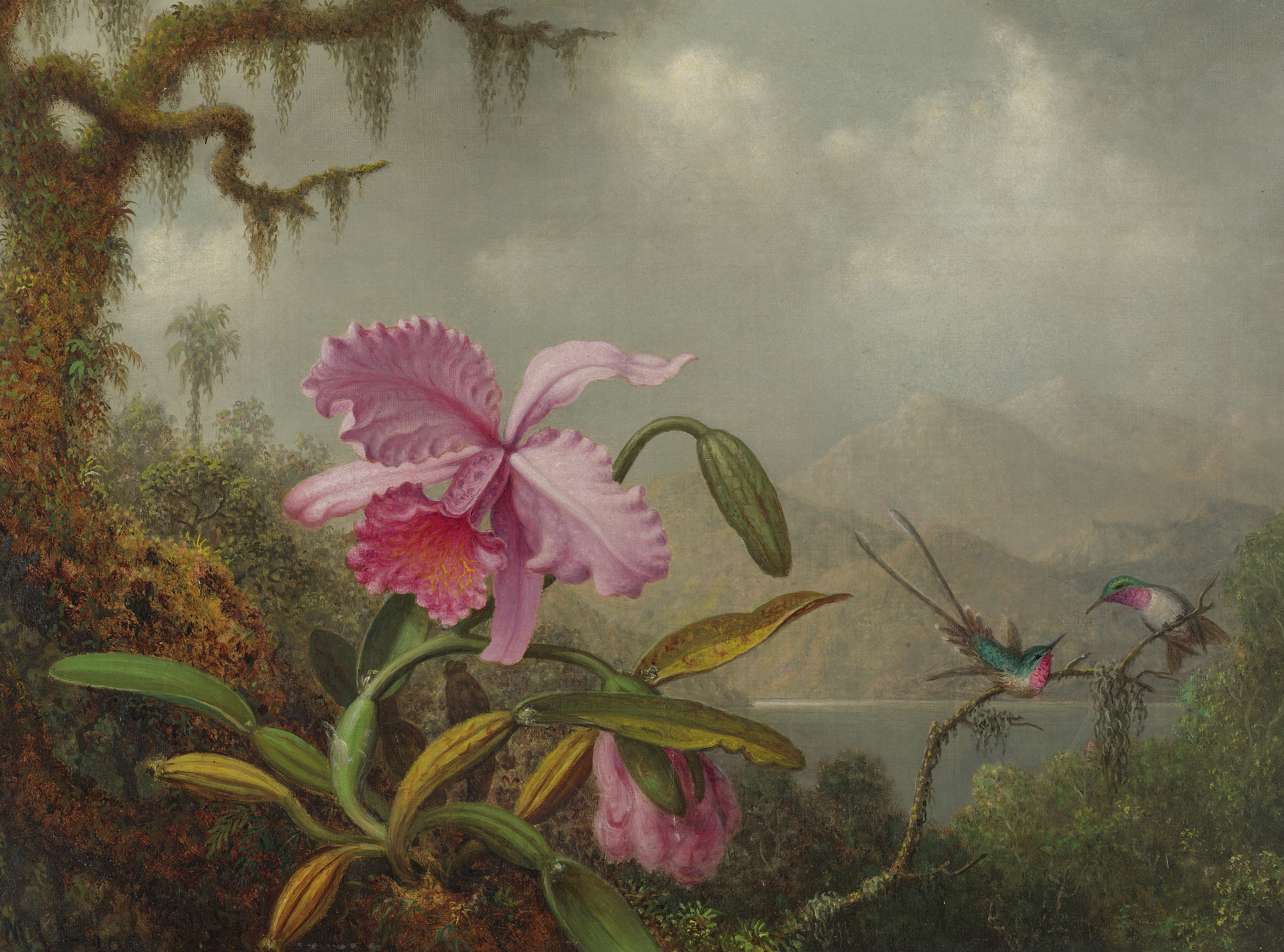
Orchids and Hummingbirds, c. 1875–1890, Private collection

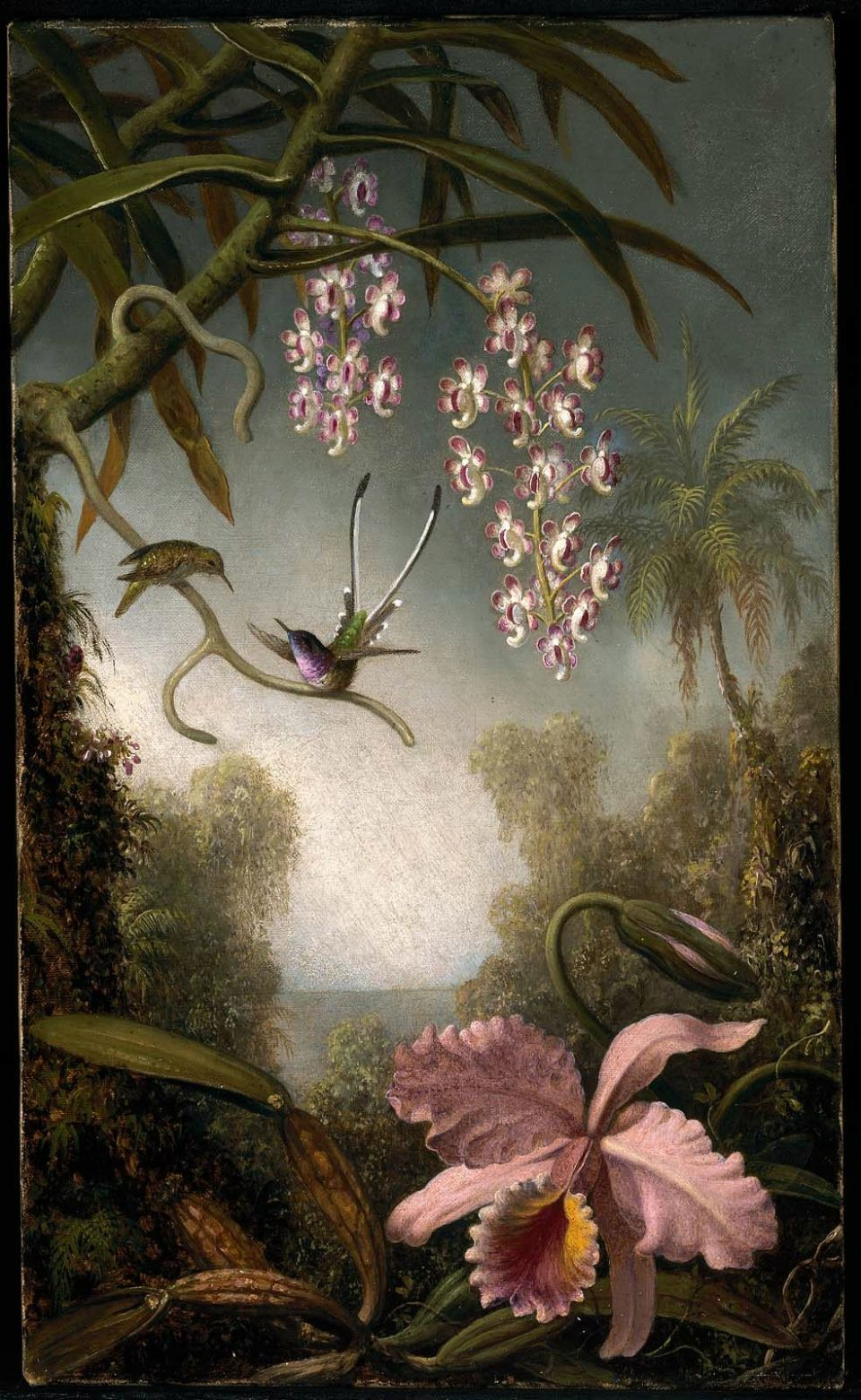
Orchids and Spray Orchids with Hummingbird, c. 1875–1890, Boston Museum of Fine Arts

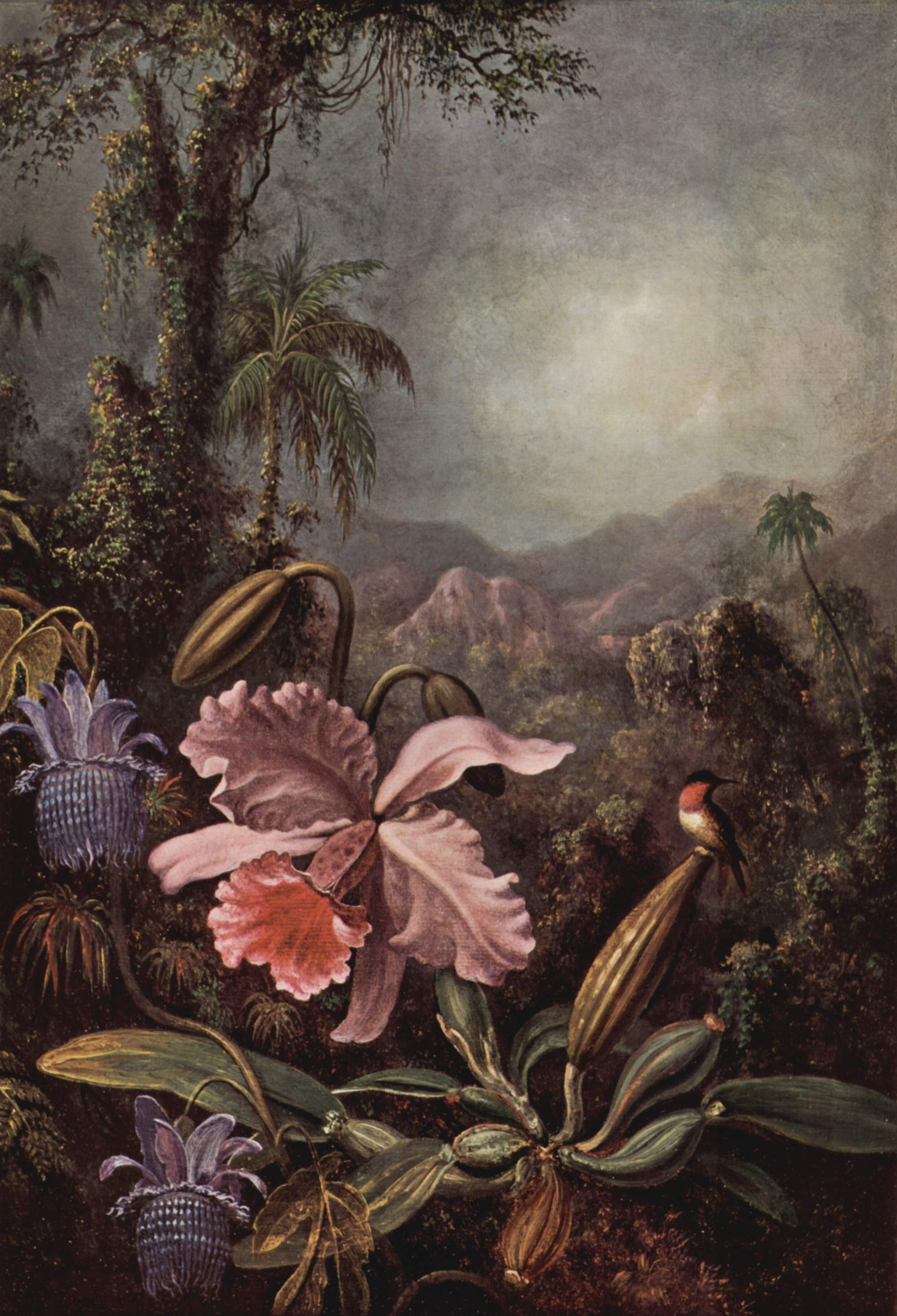
Orchid, Passion Flowers and Hummingbird, 1880, Private collection

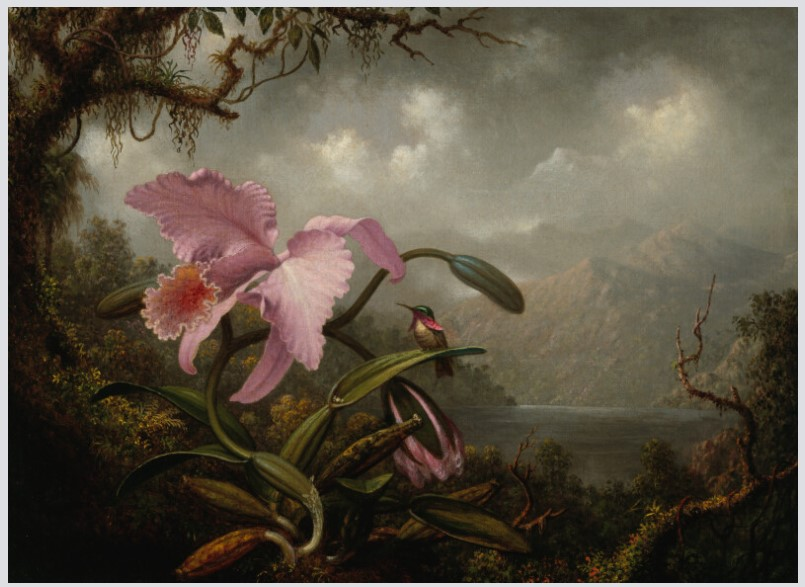
Orchid and Hummingbird, 1885, de Young (Fine Arts Museums of San Francisco)

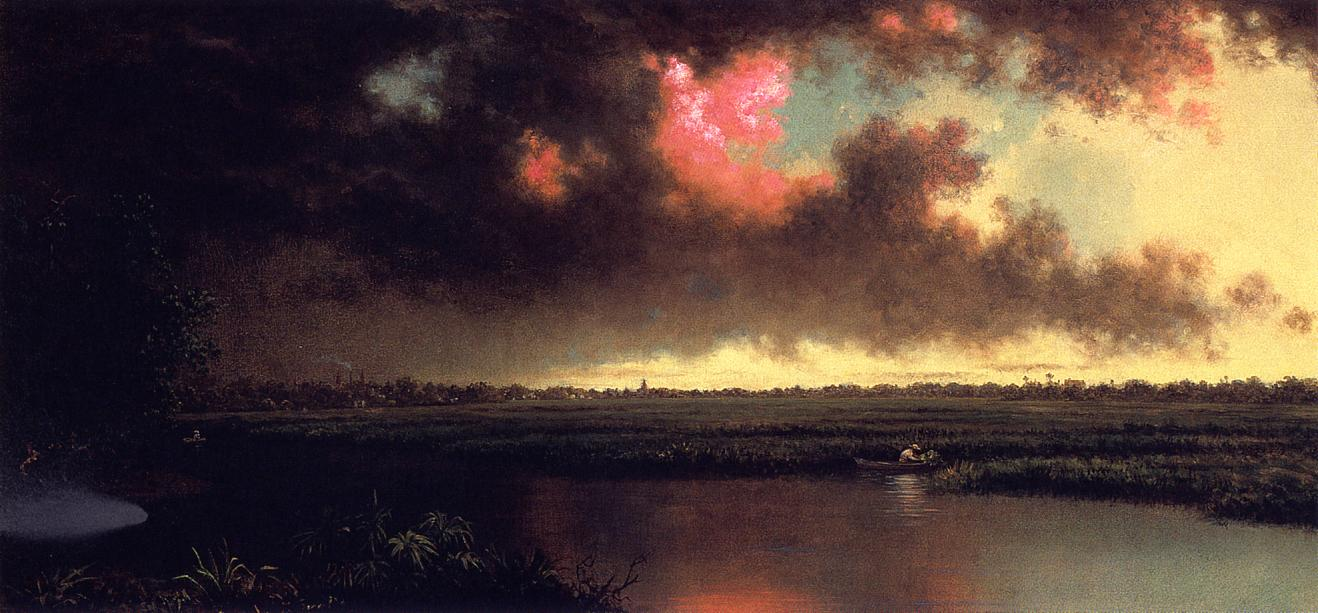
On the San Sebastian River, Florida, c. 1883–1890, Greenville County Museum of Art

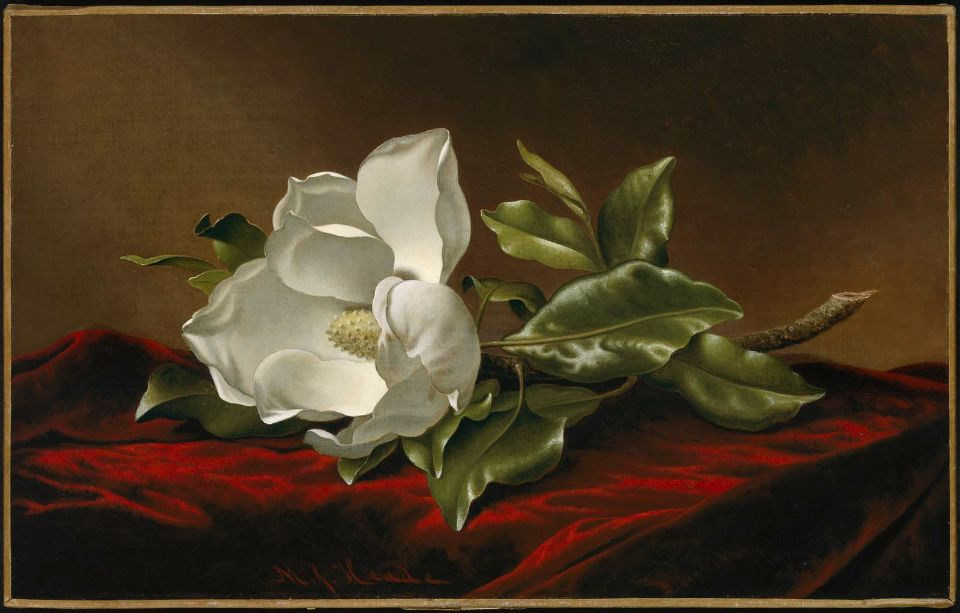
Magnolia Grandiflora, c. 1885–1895, Boston Museum of Fine Arts

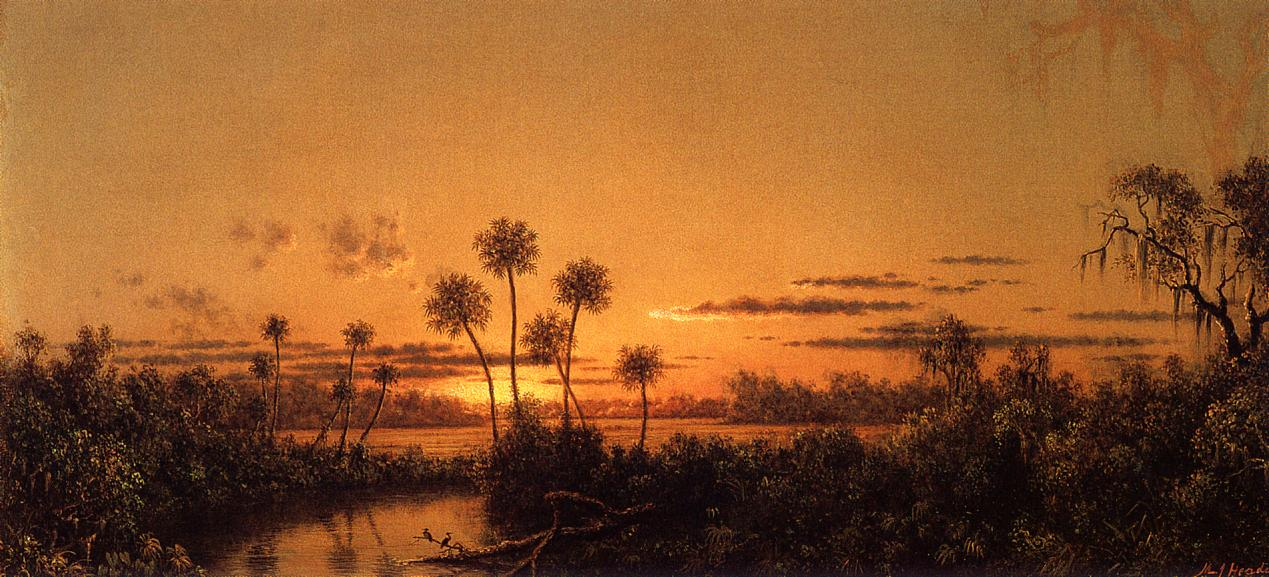
Florida River Scene: Early Evening, After Sunset, c. 1887–1900, Gilcrease Museum

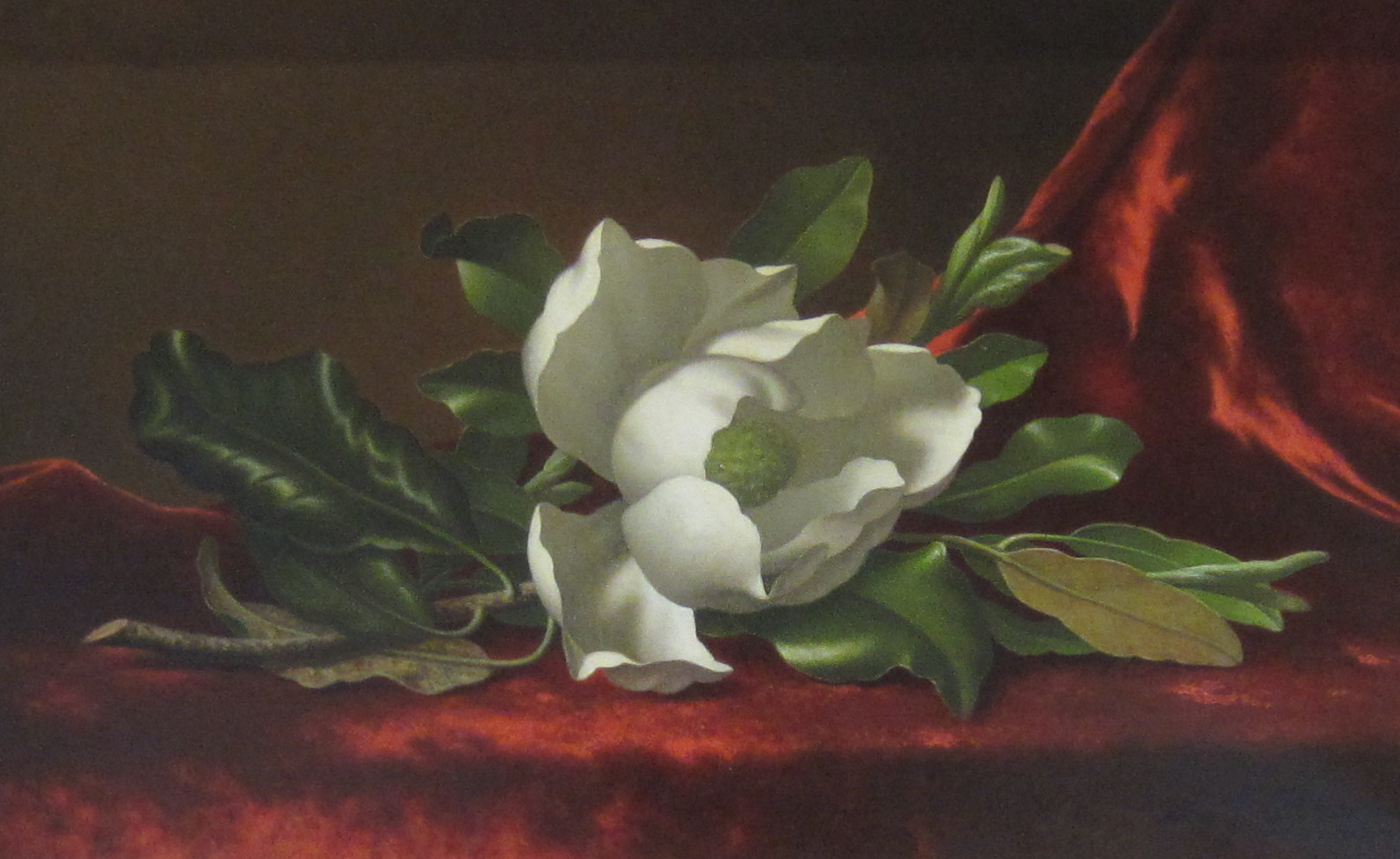
The Magnolia Blossom, 1888, Timken Museum of Art

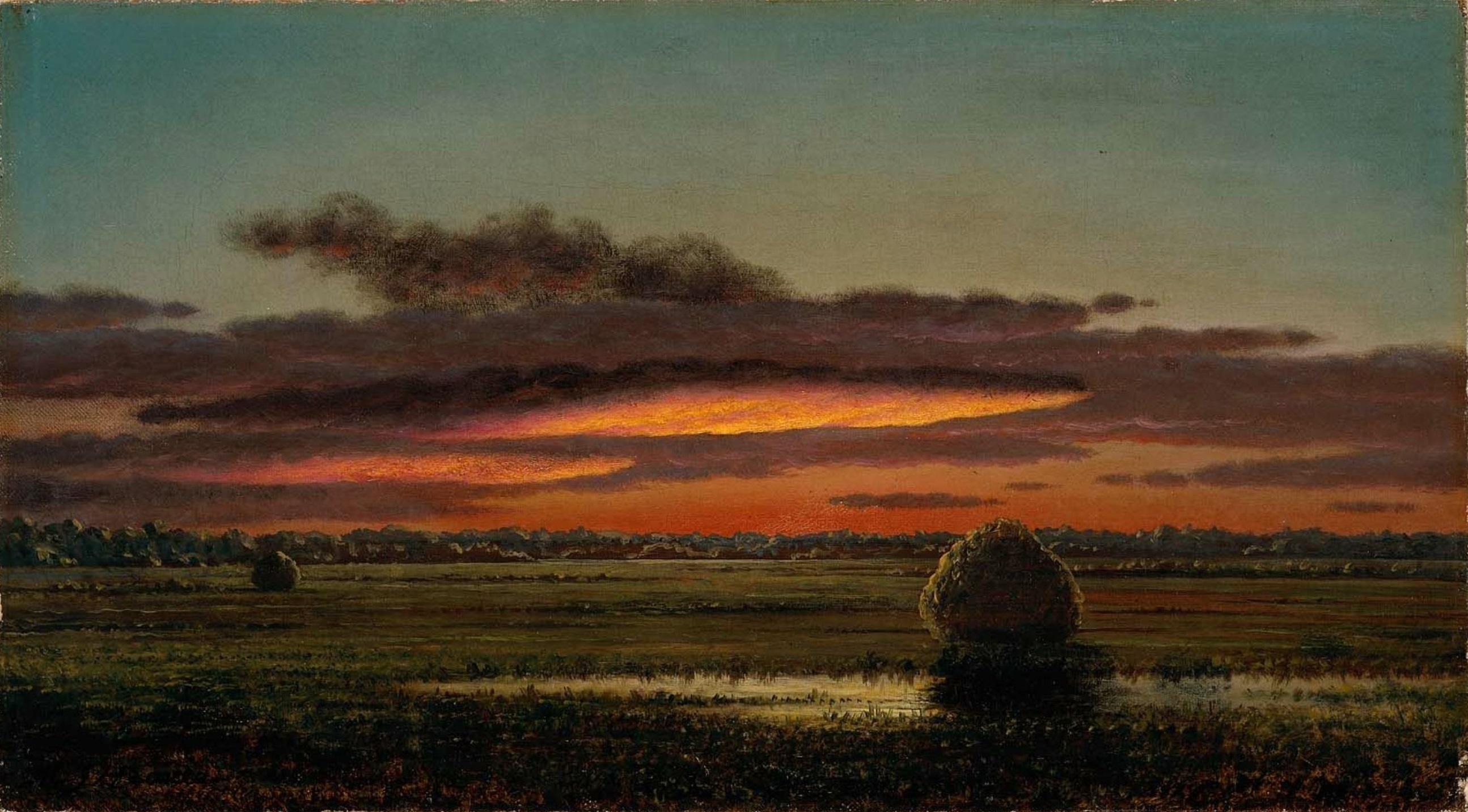
Sunset Over the Marshes, c. 1890–1904, Boston Museum of Fine Arts

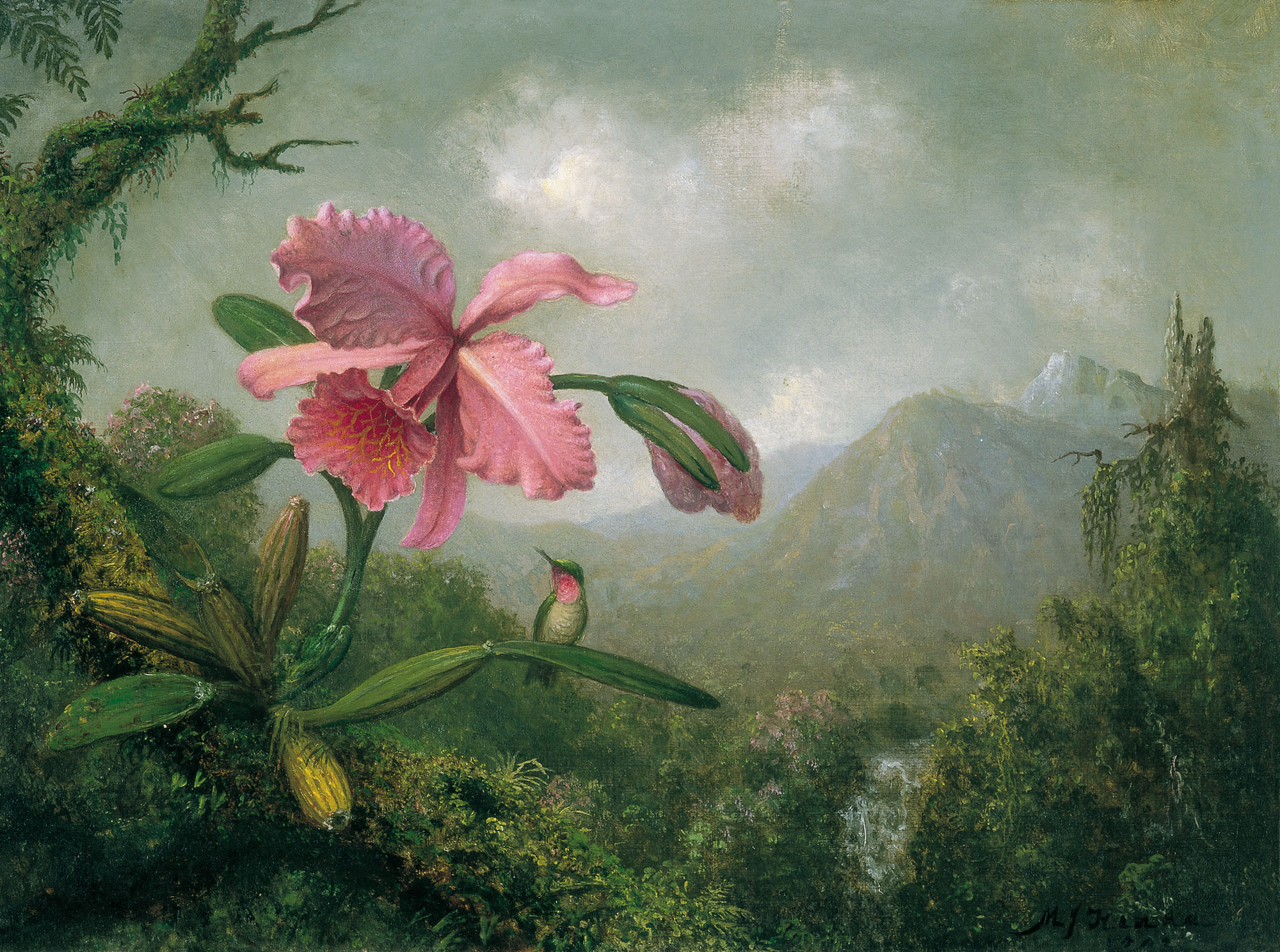
Orchid and Hummingbird near a Mountain Waterfall, 1902, Thyssen-Bornemisza Museum

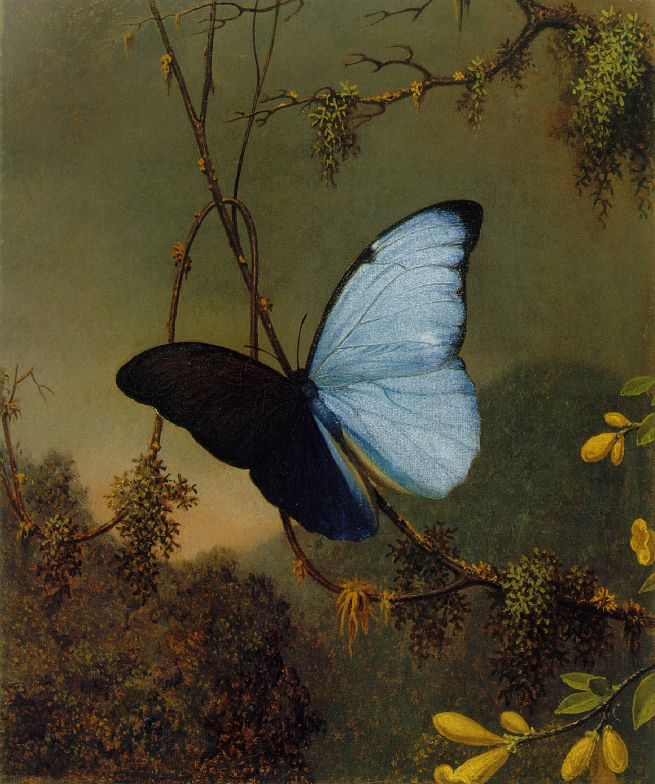
Blue Morpho Butterfly, Date unknown, Manoogian Collection

== See also ==
- List of Hudson River School artists
- Ponce de Leon Artist Colony
