= Anna Marsh =

American philanthropist (1770–1834)

- Born: Anna Hunt c. 1769; Hinsdale, New Hampshire, U.S.
- Died: October 14, 1834
- Known for: Bequest for the establishment of the Vermont Asylum for the Insane (1835)
- Father: Jonathan Hunt
- Relatives: Jonathan Hunt (brother); Lewis R. Morris (brother-in-law)

Anna Hunt Marsh (c. 1769 – October 14, 1834) was an American philanthropist. She left $10,000 in her will to establish the Vermont Asylum for the Insane (now the Brattleboro Retreat) in 1834.

== Biography ==
Marsh was born in Hinsdale, New Hampshire, the daughter Jonathan Hunt and Lavinia Swan Hunt. Her father was a member of the Vermont Convention of 1791, and served as lieutenant governor of Vermont. Her older sister Ellen (or Eleanor) married Lewis R. Morris. Their younger brother Jonathan Hunt was a Congressman and bank president.

Hunt married physician Perley Marsh in 1793. She expanded her father's mansion in Hinsdale, adding a wing and an elaborate garden. Her husband died in 1807, her father died in 1823, and she died in 1834, at the age of 65.

Marsh's will instructed heirs to build a mental hospital in Brattleboro, and named the trustees she chose to realize her vision of a facility based on a Quaker concept called moral treatment. She may have been motivated by the case of Richard Whitney, a local lawyer who died while being mistreated for derangement in 1806. Although she lived in New Hampshire, about four miles from Brattleboro, she chose to give the money for an institution in Vermont, saying she "had already done enough for New Hampshire."

The Vermont Asylum for the Insane was founded with her $10,000 bequest, and the first patients were admitted in December 1836. A new brick building on the asylum grounds, named the Marsh Building, was erected in 1856. In 1887, the remains of Anna Marsh and Perley Marsh were reinterred on the asylum grounds, with a new granite headstone. Its name was changed to Brattleboro Retreat in 1893.

== Legacy ==
As of 2026, the Brattleboro Retreat is still in operation, serving a wide variety of mental conditions on a 1000-acre campus. Brattleboro Retreat is located on Anna Marsh Lane. Her home, known as the Governor Hunt House, was purchased by Vermont Yankee Nuclear Power Corporation in 1968, and restored as a historic site.
