= Governor Hunt House =

Historic house in Vermont, USA

Coordinates: 42°46′33″N 72°30′56″W

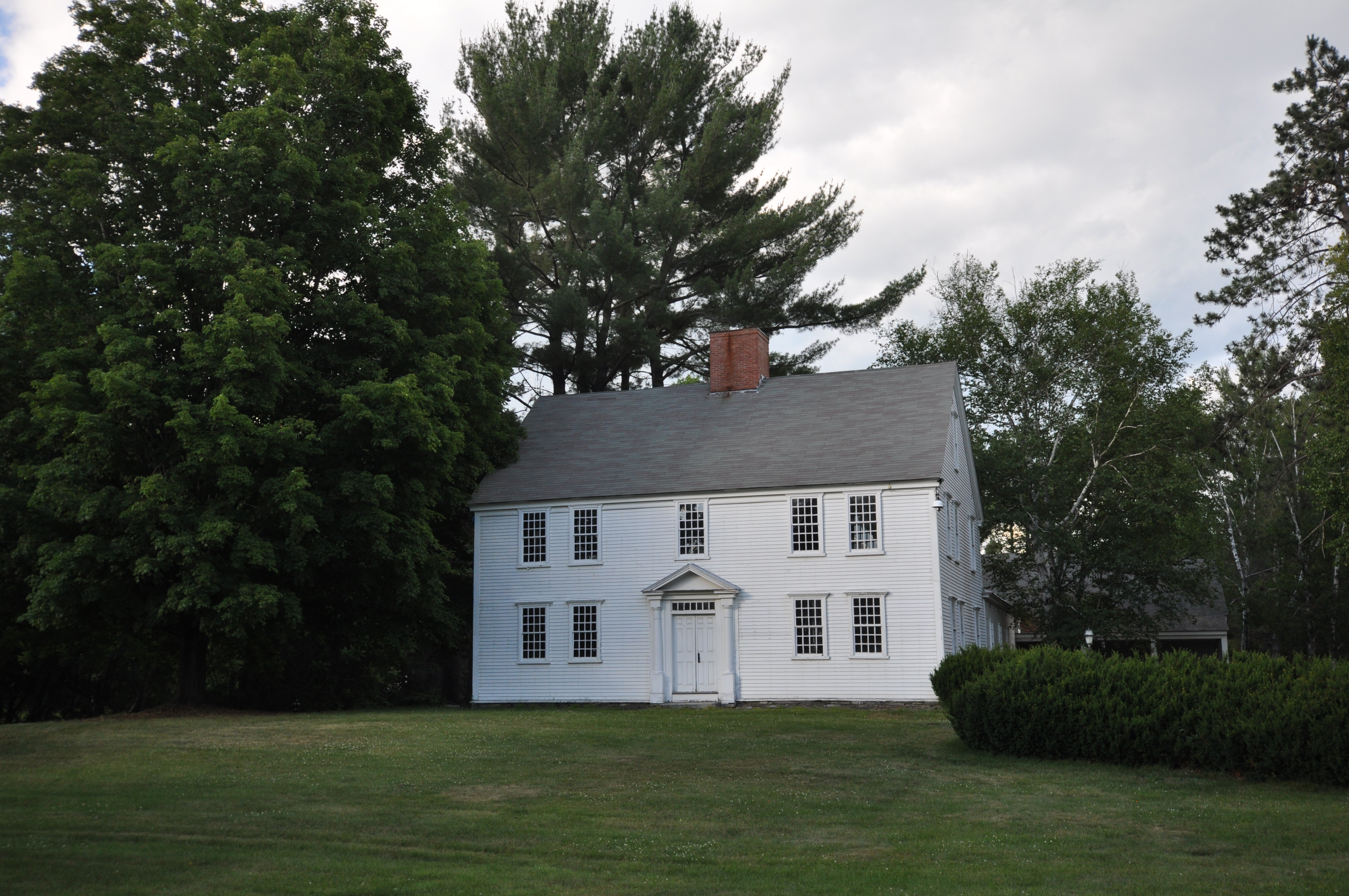
Governor Hunt House, Vernon, Vermont

The Governor Hunt House is a historic house in Vernon, Vermont, United States, and is one of the oldest houses in Vermont. It was built in 1764, a date verified by dendrochronology in 2022, by Jonathan Hunt, a Vermont pioneer who served as the state's second lieutenant governor, although he never served as governor. The house, and an attached conference wing, served for many years as a visitor center and site for training for the adjacent Vermont Yankee Nuclear Power Plant. The last operator of that plant, Entergy Corporation, donated the house in 2019 to the Friends of Vernon Center, Inc., a non-profit organization, which is working to develop the building into a community center for the town of Vernon. The building was listed on the National Register of Historic Places in 2022.
