= William Morris Hunt =

American painter (1824–1879)

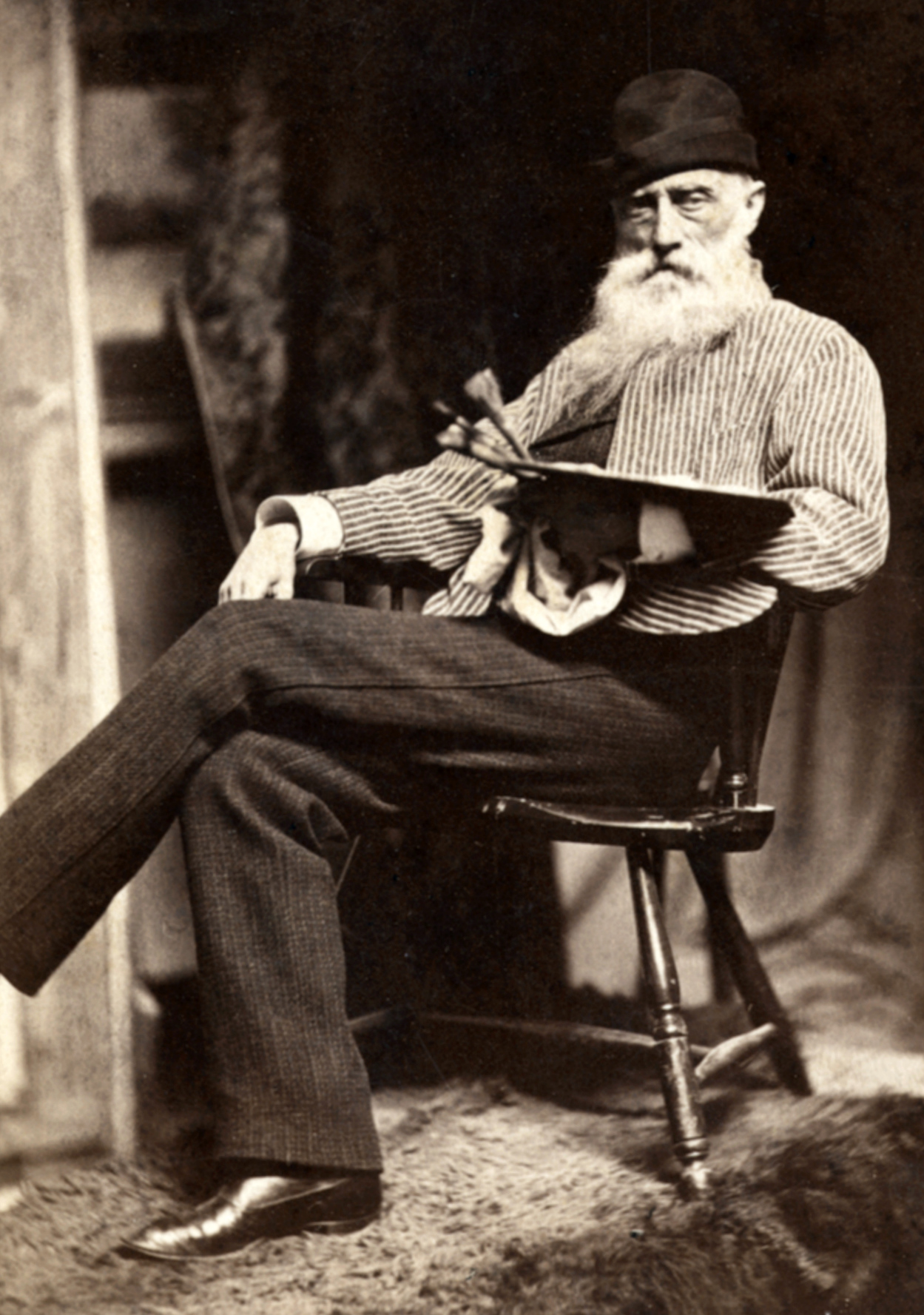
- William Morris Hunt, 1879
- Born: March 31, 1824; Brattleboro, Vermont, U.S.
- Died: September 8, 1879 (aged 55); Isles of Shoals, New Hampshire, U.S.
- Resting place: Prospect Hill Cemetery
- Education: Thomas Couture and Jean-François Millet
- Movement: American Barbizon School
- Father: Jonathan Hunt
- Relatives: Leavitt Hunt (brother); Richard Morris Hunt (brother); Thaddeus Leavitt (grandfather)
- Family: Hunt family of Vermont

William Morris Hunt (March 31, 1824 – September 8, 1879) was an American painter. Born into the political Hunt family of Vermont, he trained in Paris with the realist Jean-François Millet and studied under him at the Barbizon artists’ colony, before founding a similar group on his return to America. He became Boston's leading portrait and landscape painter, also working as a lithographer and sculptor. In 1871 he was elected to the National Academy of Design as an Associate Academician. Many of his works were destroyed in the Great Boston Fire of 1872. Another disaster was the deterioration of the stone panels in the State Capitol at Albany, New York, on which a number of his murals had been painted. This is believed to have led to his depression and presumed suicide.

== Life and career ==
William Morris Hunt was born into prominence. The family of Hunt's father Jonathan Hunt, were among Vermont's founders and largest landowners; his mother's a family of wealth and prominence in Connecticut. Hunt attended Harvard College but withdrew in his junior year. Having been denied the opportunity to paint and draw by an overbearing father, Jane Leavitt Hunt resolved that her children would be given the chance to study the arts in the best academies—even if it meant moving to Europe to attend them.

Following the death of his congressman father from cholera in 1832 at the age of 44, Hunt's mother Jane took him and his brothers to Switzerland, the South of France and to Rome, where Hunt studied with Thomas Couture in Paris, coming under the influence of Jean-François Millet after being greatly inspired by Millet's The Sower at the 1851 Paris Salon. The Hunt family remained in Europe for a dozen years. During part of that time, William Morris Hunt and his brother Richard Morris Hunt shared an apartment at 1 rue Jacob, close by the École des Beaux-Arts, where William studied painting under Couture. "From the training and inspiration each of the brothers was to experience in the next several years in France would come great strides for each in his work," writes historian David McCullough. "'Mr. William Hunt is our most promising artist here,' reported Thomas Appleton to his father." Hunt then spent the next two years under the tutelage of Millet in Barbizon before his return to the states.

The companionship of Millet had a lasting influence on Hunt's character and style, and his work grew in strength, in beauty and in seriousness. He was among the biggest proponents of the Barbizon school in America, and he more than any other turned the rising generation of American painters towards Paris. About his influence, S. G. W. Benjamin wrote in a posthumous assessment of Hunt:

To the late William M. Hunt that we must ascribe ... the general impulse toward foreign styles now modifying the arts of design in this country. ... The power of Mr. Hunt was ... felt in directing a large number of young art-students to visit Paris, and eventually also Munich, at each of which the tendency has been for some years toward bolder methods in the technics of art. The result has been to introduce to [America] a truer perception of the vital importance of style in the present stage of our art, and to emphasize the truth that he who has anything to say will make it much more effective if he knows how to give it adequate utterance.

After leaving Paris, Hunt painted and used his family connections to establish art schools in Newport, Rhode Island, Brattleboro, Vermont, the Faial Island in the Azores, and finally in Boston, where he became a popular portrait painter.

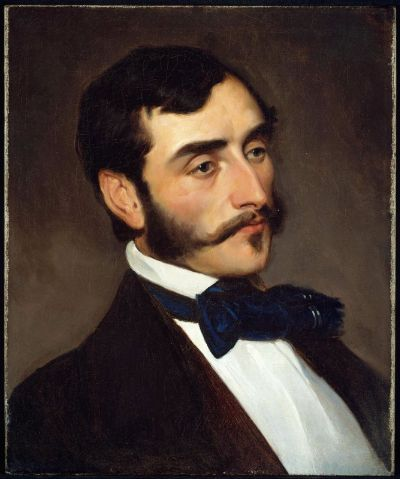
Portrait of William Morris Hunt by Emanuel Leutze (about 1845)

Before his lauded return to America in 1855, Hunt was married in Paris to Louise Dumaresq Perkins, daughter of Thomas Handasyd Perkins Jr. (son of Thomas Handasyd Perkins), a Boston merchant, philanthropist and patron of the arts. Hunt was married to Perkins again upon his return to Boston in 1855, perhaps for legal reasons. Hunt was married for the second time in the influential King's Chapel in Boston by academic and clergyman Ephraim Peabody, shortly before Peabody's death in 1856.

On his return, Hunt painted some of his most handsome canvases, all reminiscent of his life in France and of Millet's influence. Such works include The Belated Kid, Girl at the Fountain, Hurdy-Gurdy Boy, and others – but the public called for portraits, and it became the fashion to sit for Hunt; among his best paintings of this genre are those of William M. Evarts, Mrs. Charles Francis Adams, the Rev. James Freeman Clarke, Senator Charles Sumner, William H. Gardner, Chief Justice Shaw and Judge Horace Gray.

Morris sat for a full-length portrait by the artist Emanuel Leutze in Düsseldorf in 1864. Formerly part of the collection of Col. Leavitt Hunt at Elmshome in Vermont, the portrait is now in the collection of the Museum of Fine Arts, Boston.

Many of Hunt's paintings and sketches, together with five large Millets and other art treasures collected by him in Europe, were destroyed in the Great Boston Fire of 1872. Hunt owned many canvases by Millet, including Millet's The Sower, for which Millet somewhat unwillingly accepted a payment of $60 from Hunt.

Among his later works, American landscapes predominated. In the summer of 1878, the year before his death, Hunt painted a series of sweeping views of Niagara Falls. His later works also include the "Bathers: Twice Painted" and "The Allegories" for the Assembly Chamber of the State Capitol at Albany, New York, now lost due to disintegration of the stone panels on which they were painted (some scholars trace Hunt's deepening depression that led to his suicide to his despair over the loss of the Albany murals). His book, Talks about Art (London, 1878), was especially well received.

Nor did Hunt confine himself to oil painting. He was prolific, working as a lithographer and sculptor as well. From 1850 to 1877, the Vermont native was Boston's leading portrait and landscape painter; there was a backlog of Brahmins clamoring to be painted by him. Hunt is widely credited for having influenced the styles of Winslow Homer, Childe Hassam and John Joseph Enneking. Hunt's signature lively brushwork, partly derived from study of contemporary European painting, marked a new phase in 'oil sketching' that was carried on by Homer and others. Other friends and associates included artist Frank Hill Smith.

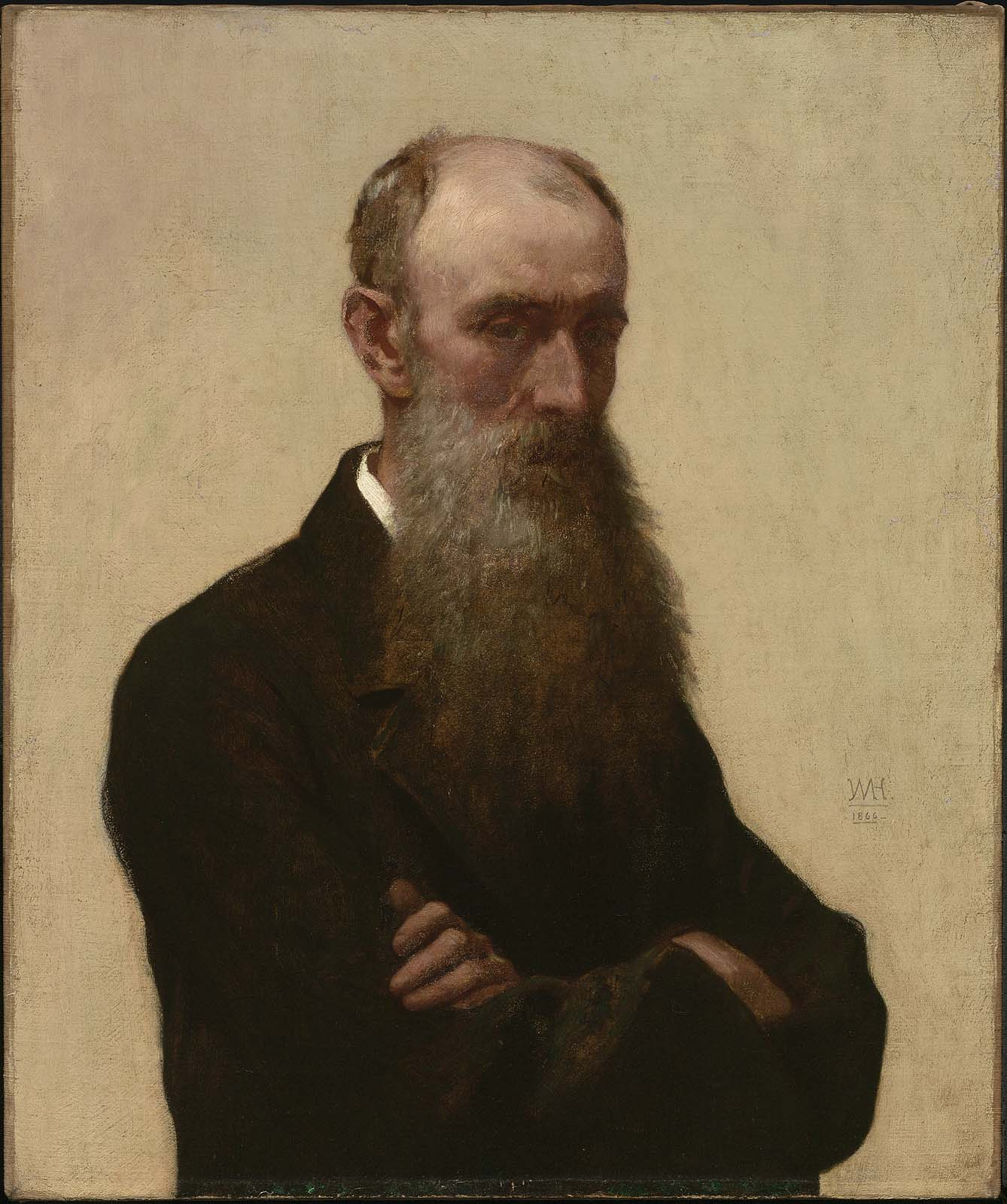
William Morris Hunt self-portrait, 1866

"The greatest of Boston painters", writes art historian G. W. Sheldon in his American Painters, "and one of the few really great American painters, Mr. William Morris Hunt, was born in Brattleboro, Vermont." While a friend and student of Millet, "Hunt is an entirely original artist, and every picture of his is a spontaneous and independent product." In a bit of art history revisionism, some scholars are now re-examining Hunt's powerful pull on other early New England artists, many better-known. Hunt was an important figure in New England arts and society. Besides collecting himself, Hunt encouraged other Boston collectors to buy works by European artists such as Millet, Monet and others.

After one early exhibition of French artists at the Boston Athenaeum, including works by Millet and Rousseau, for instance, an art professor at Harvard had written a condemnation in a Boston newspaper. Outraged, painter Hunt fired back a response in The Boston Daily Advertiser. "It is not our fault we inherit ignorance in art," Hunt wrote, "but we are not obliged to advertise it."

In 1867, for instance, Hunt and his wife sailed to Paris to attend the opening of the Exposition Universelle. In his lectures and art classes, Hunt attracted large numbers of students, many of them from prominent Brahmin families. Starting in 1868, he began teaching women at the request of Helen M. Knowlton, facing backlash from his peers who thought he was wasting his time. The Boston philosopher and author William James studied with Hunt for a time, before turning away from painting to concentrate on his writing. In 1871 Hunt was elected to the National Academy of Design as an Associate Academician.

Hunt's career owed a debt to Boston's intellectual ferment. A luncheon at his club on February 27, 1870, for instance, found these members of Hunt's circle dining together: Ralph Waldo Emerson; James Russell Lowell; Henry Wadsworth Longfellow; Edward Clarke Cabot; Martin Brimmer; Thomas Gold Appleton; William James; Francis Blackwell Forbes; and James T. Fields. Joining the group as guest was Erastus Brigham Bigelow, a founder of the Massachusetts Institute of Technology.

William Morris Hunt died at the Isles of Shoals, New Hampshire, in 1879, apparently a suicide. Hunt had gone to the New Hampshire shore to recover from a crippling depression. But he continued to work, executing his last sketch three days before his death. His body was discovered by his friend, New Hampshire poet Celia Thaxter.

His brother Richard Morris Hunt was a celebrated architect. Another brother, Leavitt Hunt, was a well-known photographer and attorney. A fourth brother, Jonathan, was a Paris physician who also committed suicide.

The William Morris Hunt Library of the Boston Museum of Fine Arts is named in honor of this painter. (Hunt was a founding member of the Museum of Fine Arts' museum school). Following Hunt's death, his Harvard classmates and other Bostonians contributed to a fund to purchase many of his paintings and donate them to the Museum of Fine Arts.

Aside from the Museum of Fine Arts, the Boston Athenaeum has a number of the artist's works in its collection, a gift of William Morris Hunt II. Also owning works by Hunt are New York City's Metropolitan Museum of Art, the Louvre Museum in Paris, the Musée d'Orsay in Paris, the Fine Arts Museums of San Francisco, the National Gallery of Art in Washington, D.C., the Addison Gallery of American Art at Hunt's alma mater Phillips Academy in Andover, Mass., the Bennington Museum, Vermont, the Bowdoin College Museum of Art, the Brooklyn Museum of Art, the Carnegie Museum of Art in Pittsburgh, the Currier Museum of Art in New Hampshire, the Harvard University Art Museums, Salem's Peabody Essex Museum, the Pennsylvania Academy of the Fine Arts and many others.

In accordance with a long expressed desire, William Morris Hunt was buried at Prospect Hill cemetery in Brattleboro, Vermont, beside other family members. Two decades after Hunt's death, his former pupil Helen Mary Knowlton published her biography of the Boston painter entitled The Art-Life of William Morris Hunt.

== Personal life ==
William Morris Hunt and his wife, the former Louisa Dumaresq Perkins, had five children. His daughter Eleanor "Ellen" (1858–1941) married German officer of the Prussian Army Ernst Curt Sigismond Diederich (1851–1887). One of their children was the artist Wilhelm Hunt Diederich.

== Gallery ==
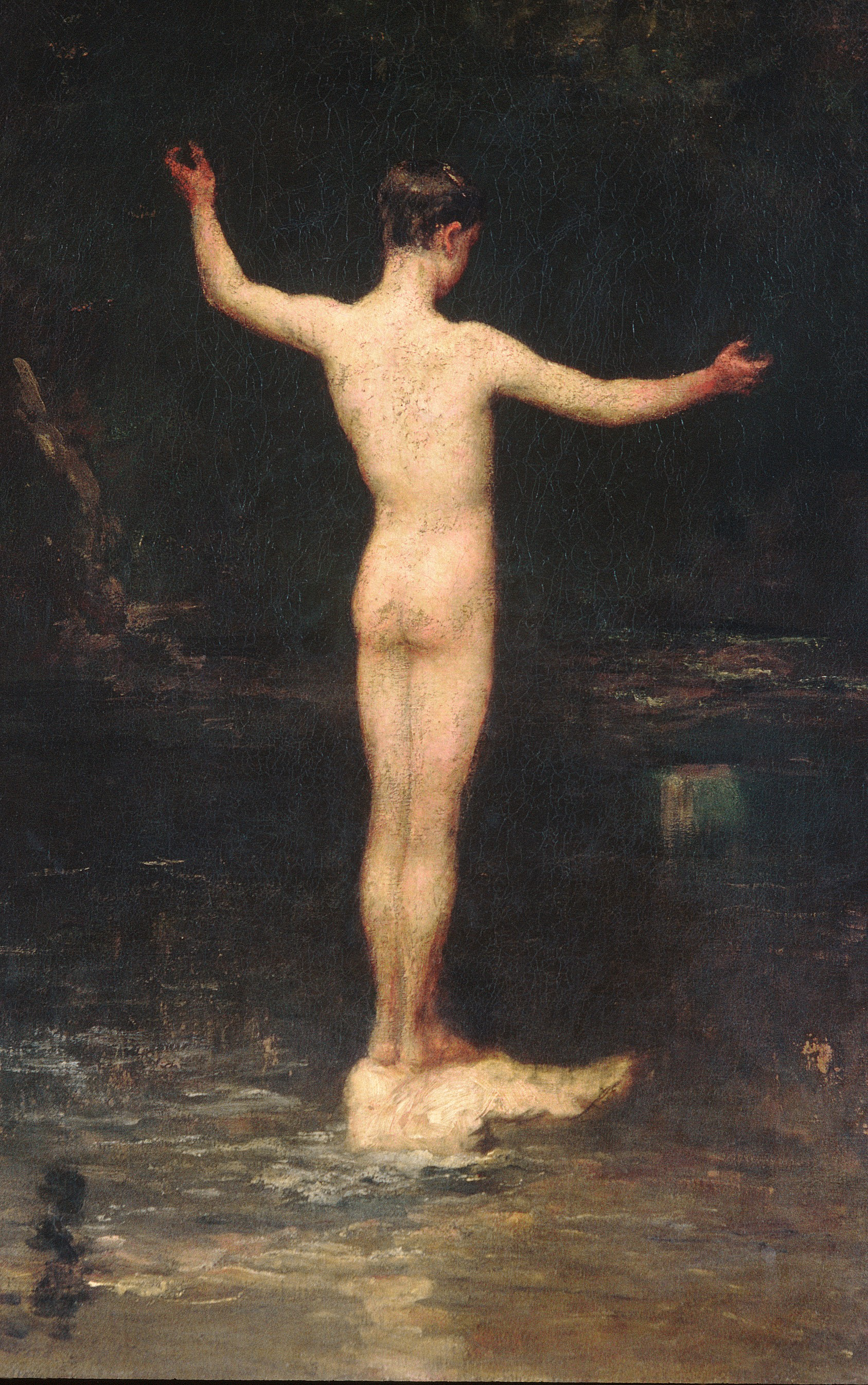
The Bathers, 1877, The Metropolitan Museum of Art

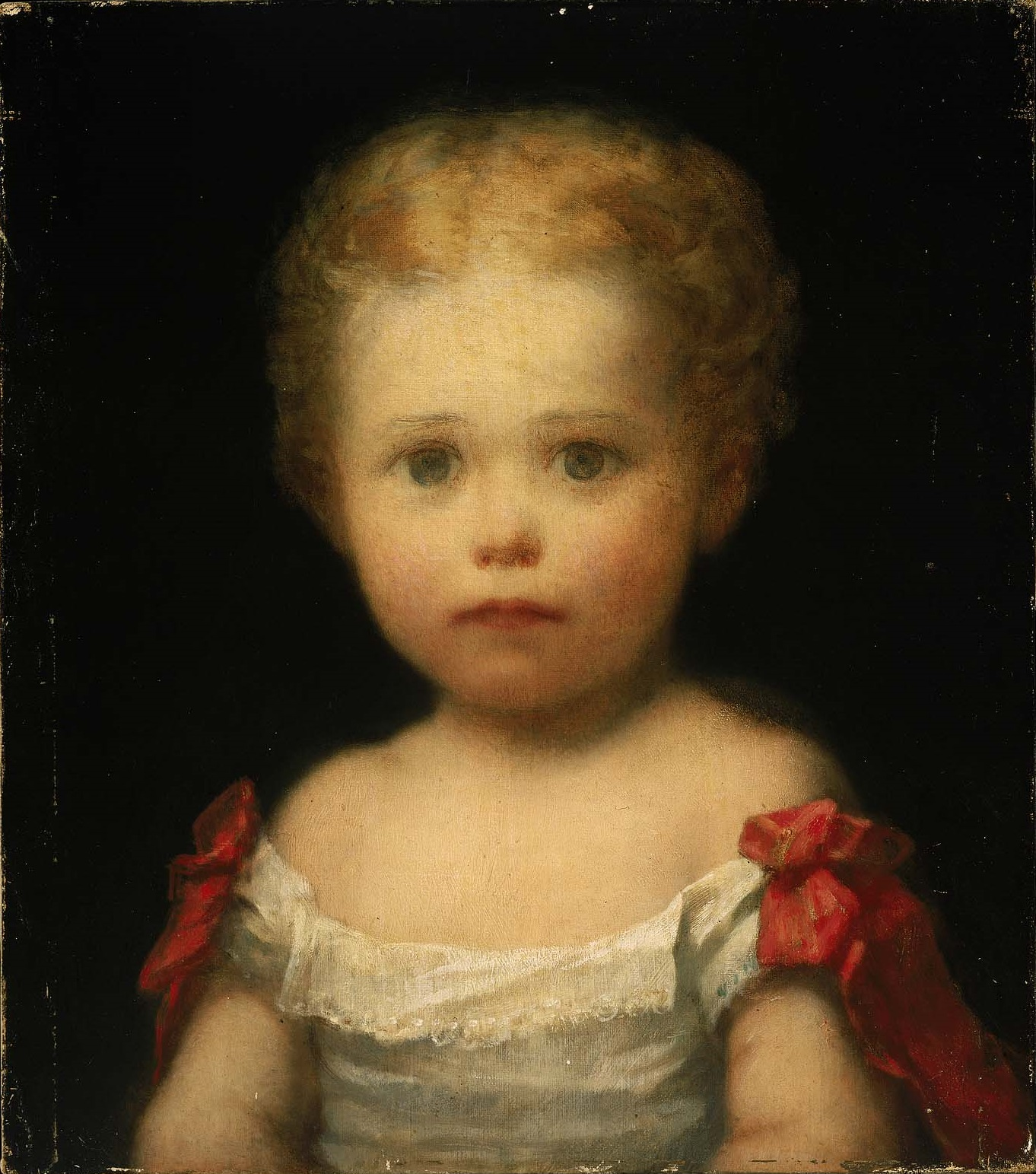
Portrait of Morris Hunt, son of William Morris Hunt, 1857, Boston Museum of Fine Arts

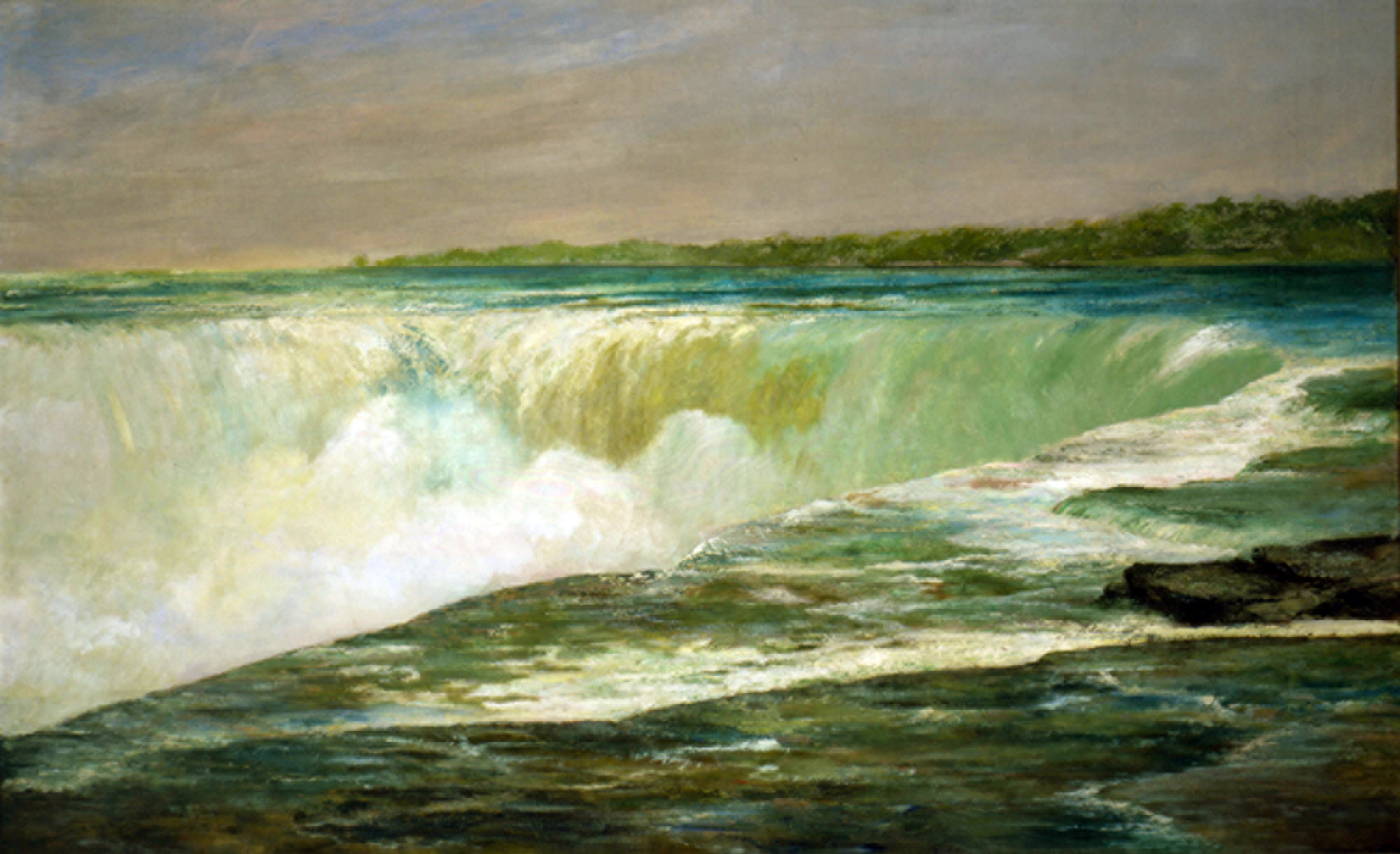
Niagara Falls, 1878, one of his last paintings

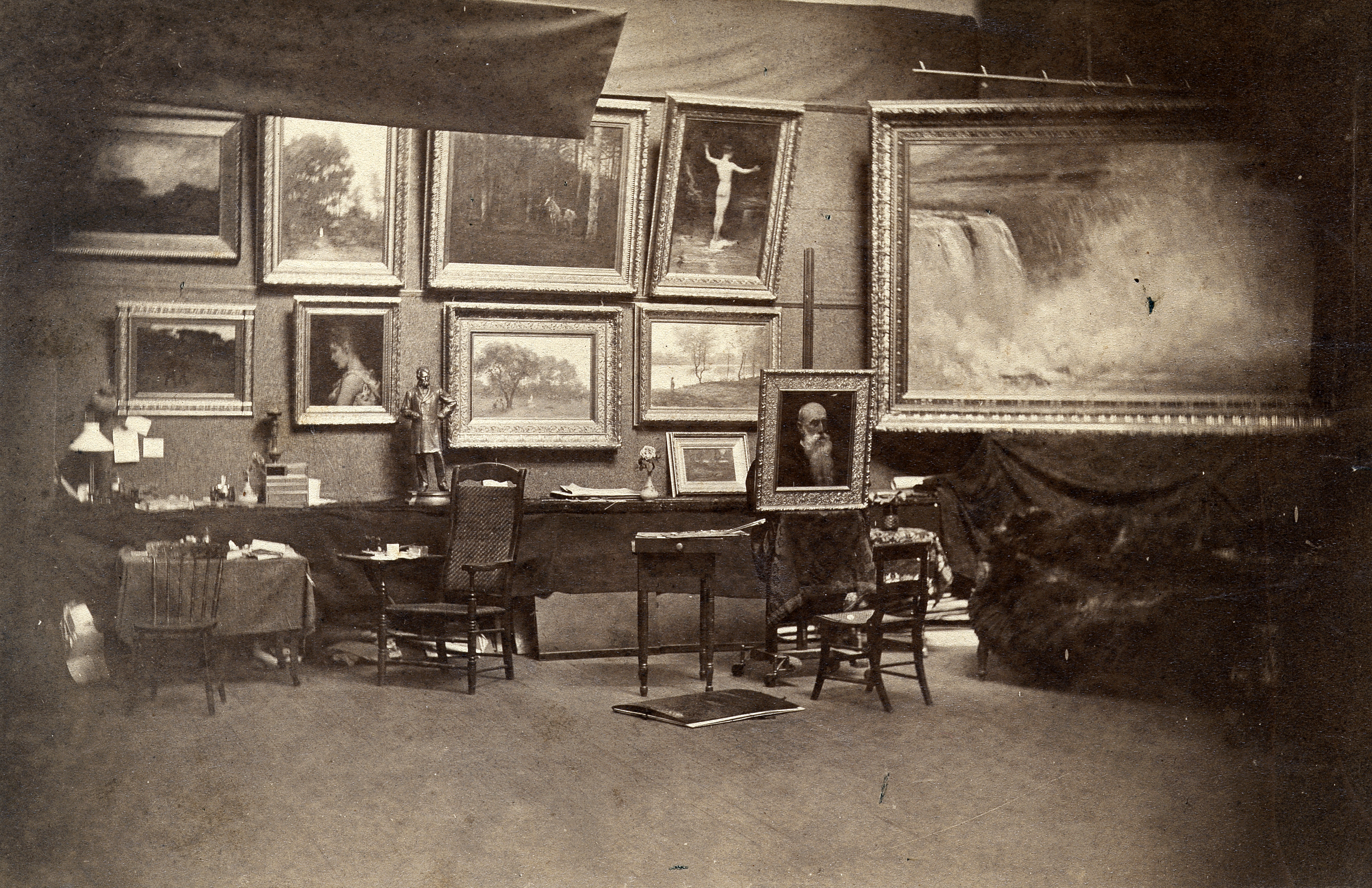
Hunt's studio, 1879

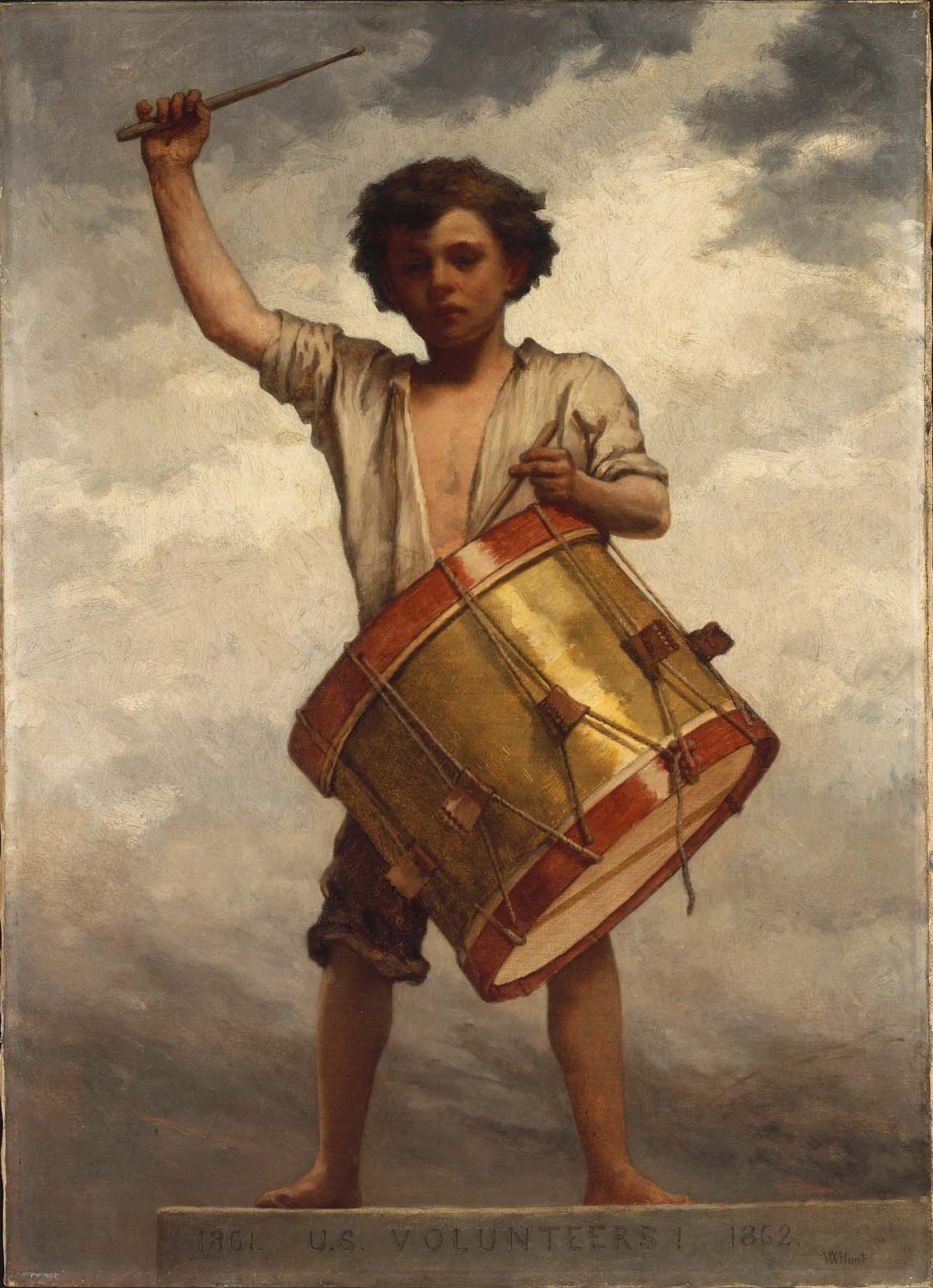
The Drummer Boy, c. 1862, Museum of Fine Arts, Boston

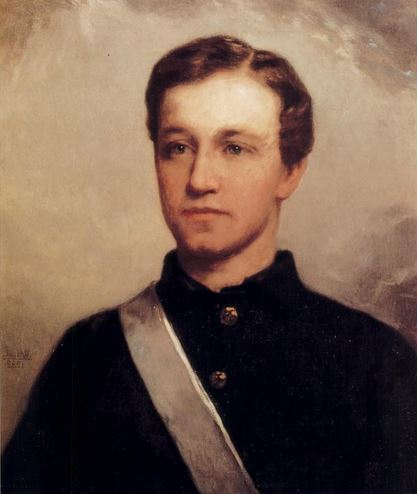
Wheaton Theodore King, 1865

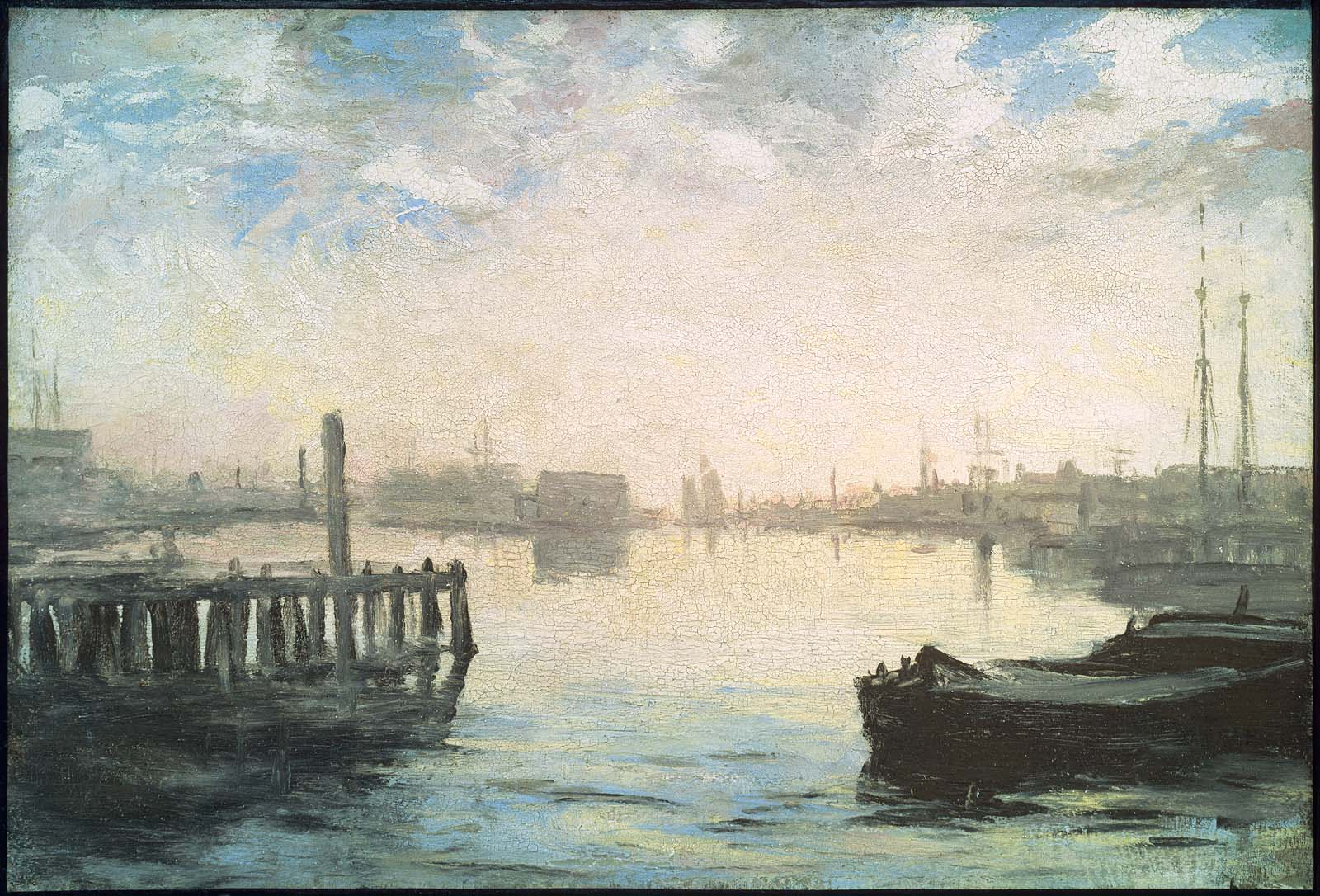
Gloucester Harbor, c. 1877

== See also ==
- Richard Morris Hunt
- Leavitt Hunt
- Thaddeus Leavitt
- Jonathan Hunt (Vermont Representative)
- Jonathan Hunt (Vermont Lieutenant Governor)
- Jarvis Hunt

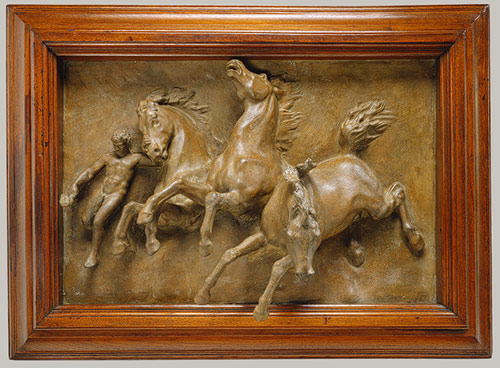
The Horses of Anahita, bas relief sculpture prefiguring Hunt's murals for the New York State Capitol, c. 1848, Metropolitan Museum of Art
