= Hunt family =

Hunt family may refer to:

- Hunt family (Texas), Texas, US
- Hunt-Pázmán, also known as "Hunt family", Kingdom of Hungary
- Hunt family of Vermont, Vermont, US
- Hunt family murders, Hertfordshire, England
