= Jonathan Hunt (Vermont congressman) =

American politician (1787–1832)

Member of the U.S. House of Representatives from Vermont's 1st district
- In office March 4, 1827 – May 15, 1832
- Preceded by: William Czar Bradley
- Succeeded by: Hiland Hall

Member of the Vermont House of Representatives
- In office 1811; 1816-1817; 1824

Personal details
- Born: August 12, 1787 Vernon, Vermont Republic
- Died: May 15, 1832 (aged 44) Washington D.C., US
- Resting place: The Old Cemetery on the Hill; Brattleboro, Vermont
- Citizenship: US
- Party: Adams Party
- Spouse: Jane Maria (Leavitt) Hunt
- Relations: Thaddeus Leavitt; John Webster; Timothy Swan; Lewis R. Morris; Jarvis Hunt
- Children: William Morris Hunt; Richard Morris Hunt; Leavitt Hunt; Jonathan Hunt; Jane Maria Hunt
- Parent(s): Jonathan Hunt; Lavinia (Swan) Hunt
- Education: Dartmouth College
- Profession: Lawyer; Politician

Military service
- Allegiance: United States of America
- Branch/service: Vermont Militia
- Rank: General

Jonathan Hunt (August 12, 1787 – May 15, 1832) was an American lawyer and politician. He was a member of the United States House of Representatives for the state of Vermont and was a member of the prominent Hunt family of Vermont.

== Early life ==
Born on August 12, 1787, in Vernon, in the Vermont Republic, Hunt graduated from Dartmouth College, Hanover, New Hampshire, in 1807. Afterwards, Hunt studied law and was admitted to the bar in 1812. Hunt commenced practice in Brattleboro, Vermont, in 1812. He was the first president of the Old Brattleboro Bank in 1821, the first bank established in Brattleboro, a position he held for years afterward. He also carried the rank of General in the Vermont militia, as had his uncle Arad Hunt.

== Political career ==
Hunt held many political positions in Vermont, and served as a member of the Vermont House of Representatives in 1811, 1816, 1817 and 1824. He was elected as an Adams candidate to represent Vermont's 1st congressional district in 1827. He served in the United States House of Representatives during the Twentieth, Twenty-first, and Twenty-second Congresses, serving from March 4, 1827, until his death on May 15, 1832.

Hunt was a lifelong friend of statesman and orator Daniel Webster. The brick home that Hunt had built in Brattleboro, later known as the Colonel Hooker home, was the first brick home built in town.

== Death ==
Hunt died in Washington, D.C., on May 15, 1832, aged 44, while still in office. At his death he left an estate valued in excess of $150,000. He was buried in the family plot in the Old Cemetery on the Hill in Brattleboro, Vermont.

== Family ==
A graduate of Dartmouth, Hunt served as a trustee of Vermont's Middlebury College, where Hunt family members had been early benefactors.

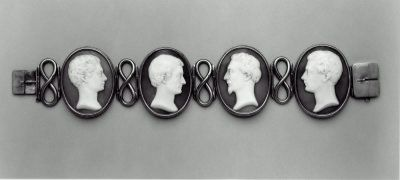
Bracelet with cameo portraits of four sons of Jonathan and Jane Hunt, carved by artist William Morris Hunt, Museum of Fine Arts, Boston

Hunt was the son of Jonathan Hunt and Lavinia (Swan) Hunt. His father was born in Massachusetts and was an early pioneer and land speculator in Vermont. He served as Lieutenant Governor of Vermont from 1794 to 1796. Hunt's uncle was composer and poet Timothy Swan, and his aunt was married to U.S. Congressman Lewis R. Morris.

Hunt married Jane Maria Leavitt of Suffield, Connecticut. She was part of the New England Dwight family which was heavily involved in the shipping business and in the purchase of the Western Reserve. Jane's father, Thaddeus Leavitt, was a successful merchant whose clipper ships traded with the West Indies. He invented an early cotton gin and was one of the principal purchasers of the Western Reserve lands in Ohio.

Hunt and his wife Jane had five children: artist Jane Maria Hunt, physician Jonathan Hunt, painter William Morris Hunt, architect Richard Morris Hunt and early photographer and New York attorney Leavitt Hunt. Following Hunt's death, his wife took their children to Geneva, Paris and Rome for an extended Grand Tour that stretched into a dozen years. The Hunt children were able to study the arts in European academies and become part of an American expatriate community in Europe. Four of Hunt's children returned to America. The fifth, his namesake son Jonathan, remained in Paris, where he studied medicine at the University of Paris and subsequently practiced medicine until his early death, a suicide in 1874. (Jonathan Hunt's son William Morris Hunt also committed suicide, at the Isles of Shoals in New Hampshire.) Hunt's nephew was Chicago architect Jarvis Hunt.

== See also ==
- Richard Morris Hunt, William Morris Hunt, Leavitt Hunt, Jarvis Hunt
- List of members of the United States Congress who died in office (1790–1899)

U.S. House of Representatives
Preceded by William Czar Bradley	Member of the United States House of Representatives from Vermont's 1st district 1827-1832	Succeeded by Hiland Hall
