= Thaddeus Leavitt =

American politician (1750–1813)

- Born: September 9, 1750; Suffield, Connecticut
- Died: 1813 (aged 62–63)
- Spouse: Elizabeth King
- Children: 2

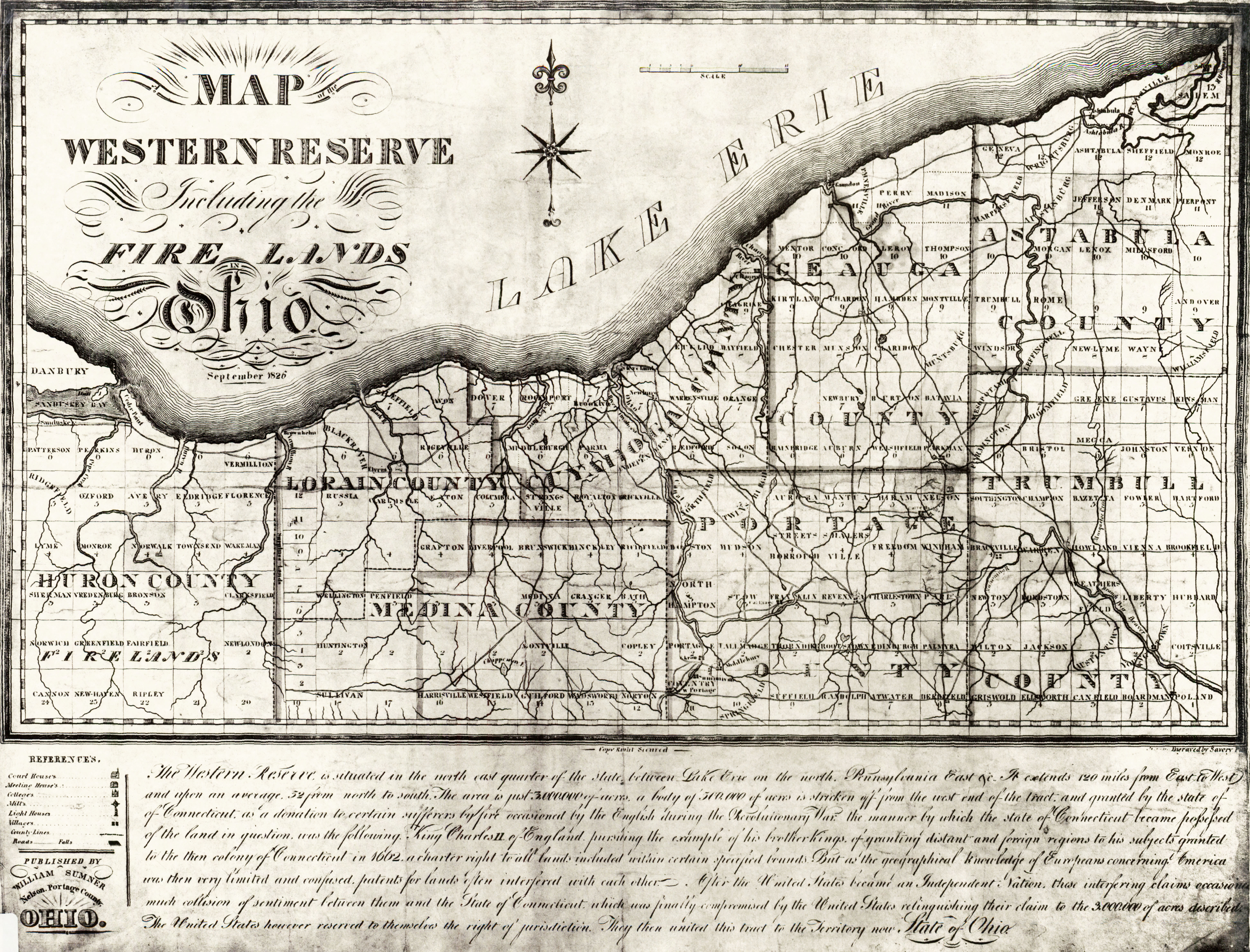
Leavitt was one of the original eight purchasers of the Connecticut Western Reserve, ca. 1826

Thaddeus Leavitt (September 9, 1750 – 1813) was an American merchant who invented an improved upon version of the cotton gin, as well as joining with seven other Connecticut men to purchase most of the three-million-plus acres of the Western Reserve lands in Ohio from the government of Connecticut, land on which some of his family eventually settled, founding Leavittsburg, Ohio, and settling in Trumbull County, Ohio. Leavitt served on a commission in the early nineteenth century to settle boundary disputes between Massachusetts and Connecticut, was a director of one of Connecticut's first banks, and was a shipowner whose vessels traded throughout the Atlantic. Leavitt also kept a journal in which he noted everything from the weather to 'cures' for various ailments to the adoption of the United States Constitution.

== Early life ==
Leavitt was born on September 9, 1750, in Suffield, Connecticut. He was a son of farmer and carpenter John Leavitt and his wife Abiah (née Kent) Leavitt.

== Career ==
Leavitt became an early Suffield merchant, selectman and Justice of the Peace, and was known as 'Squire Leavitt.' He ran a store in Suffield, and from an early age began investing in the shipping business. Leavitt was one of Hartford County's leading citizens, and became wealthy in his dealings as a merchant and shipowner. His ships traded as far afield as the West Indies and other far-flung destinations, and the entrepreneurial Leavitt acted as both importer and exporter. Thanks to his increasing wealth, Leavitt built the home later known in Suffield as the Harmon House on High Street.

Eventually Leavitt's business interests extended as far as Spain. He used the profits from his increasingly lucrative trading to join seven other prominent Connecticut men in purchasing the Western Reserve lands from the state of Connecticut, which the state had offered for sale in exchange for funds paid into the state's treasury for educational purposes. Thaddeus Leavitt Esq. and Suffield businessmen Oliver Phelps (then the largest landowner in America), Gideon Granger, Luther Loomis and Asahel Hatheway owned between them one-quarter of all the lands assigned to Connecticut in the Western Reserve.

Also investing in the Connecticut Land Company were other of the state's most powerful men. Another investor in the new western lands was Leavitt family relation Oliver Ellsworth, the Chief Justice of the United States Supreme Court, former United States Senator from Connecticut and a chief framer of the United States Constitution. (Ellsworth's share of the Reserve alone came to over 41,000 acres (170 km^{2}) and embraced much of modern-day Cleveland). One of the first settlers of the Western Reserve was John Leavitt, brother of Thaddeus and founder of a family who went on to become prominent Ohio citizens.

In 1803 Leavitt was among several Connecticut citizens chosen to resolve a dispute between the states of Connecticut and Massachusetts concerning the border between the two states. (Suffield was once considered part of Massachusetts at the time that Thaddeus Leavitt's ancestor Lieutenant Joshua Leavitt arrived in Suffield from his birthplace in Hingham, Massachusetts). Leavitt was one of a succession of trustees ordered to resolve the ongoing conflict between the two New England states.

Leavitt's appointment to the border commission flowed from his mercantile interests in the region. In 1805, he joined with several citizens of Connecticut and Massachusetts to form a company designated by the legislature as "The Proprietors of the Springfield Bridge". The corporation's aim was building a bridge over the Connecticut River linking West Springfield and Springfield, Massachusetts.

Within the state of Connecticut, Leavitt's interests came to embrace the state's burgeoning development. He served as one of the earliest directors of the newly-incorporated Hartford Bank (later the Hartford National Bank). Merchant Leavitt even had his fingers in the state's agricultural economy, serving on the committee of the Hartford County Agricultural Society.

Unusually for an early merchant, pressed for time, Leavitt kept a long-running diary about events in Suffield and the vicinity. (The diary today is in the collection of the Kent Memorial Library in Suffield, and its pages have been transcribed into a typewritten manuscript for easier reading.) In its pages, Leavitt noted many of the day-to-day occurrences in Suffield, including an entry from December 1, 1802, on a cure for whooping cough; another for a cure for a spider bite; and an entry from March 1803 for "a Receipt [ie, instructions] for taking film off a horses eye". Leavitt took note of the raising of a new Meeting house, and on February 8, 1788, he made this entry: "We this day have certain Inteligence [sic] from the state convention Boston Massachusetts that they have adopted the Feaderal Constitution by a Majority in favr of it of 19--passd 5th Inst."

== Personal life ==
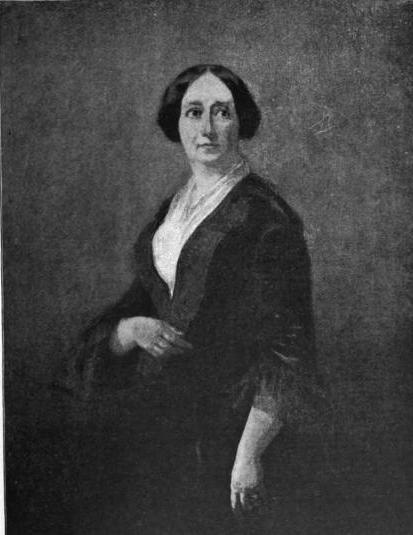
Jane Leavitt Hunt, granddaughter of Thaddeus Leavitt. Painted by son William Morris Hunt, Paris, 1850

Thaddeus Leavitt married Elizabeth King, daughter of Ensign William King of Suffield and his wife Lucy Hatheway. A piece of French furniture was emblazoned with a brass plaque to commemorate the couple's marriage, and given to them, probably by Leavitt's new King in-laws. Together, they had two children who married siblings:

- Thaddeus Leavitt Jr., who also became a Suffield merchant; he married Jemima Loomis of Suffield;
- Elizabeth Leavitt, who married Jemima's brother Hon. Luther Loomis.

Leavitt, Esq., is buried in the Old Burying Ground of the First Congregational Church of Suffield, also known as the First Church of Christ, established in 1698.

=== Descendants ===
Leavitt's descendants include his great-grandsons, the three Hunt brothers: architect Richard Morris Hunt; Boston painter William Morris Hunt; and the lawyer and photography pioneer Leavitt Hunt.

== See also ==
- Hunt family of Vermont
- John Leavitt (Ohio settler)
- Oliver Ellsworth
- Henry Leavitt Ellsworth
- Richard Morris Hunt
- William Morris Hunt
- Leavitt Hunt
- Western Reserve
- Leavittsburg, Ohio
