= List of Hunt family members of Vermont =

This list of Hunt family members of Vermont includes notable members of an American family that was involved in political and fine arts circles in the 18th, 19th, and 20th centuries. The family was primarily based in the town of Brattleboro, Vermont.

== Notable family members ==
- Richard Morris Hunt (1827–1895) – American architect
- William Morris Hunt (1824–1879) – artist and painter
- Jonathan Hunt Sr. (1738–1823) – Vermont politician
- Jonathan Hunt Jr. – Vermont politician and Congressman
- Leavitt Hunt (1787–1832) – attorney, politician and photographer
- Jarvis Hunt (1863–1941) – Chicago architect
- Richard Howland Hunt (1862–1931) – architect and son/successor of Richard Morris Hunt
- Joseph Howland Hunt (1870–1954) – architect; brother and partner of Richard Howland Hunt in the firm of Hunt & Hunt
