= Hunt Diederich =

American painter

- Born: May 3, 1884; Szent-Grót (Zalaszentgrót), Western Transdanubia, Austria-Hungary
- Died: May 14, 1953 (aged 69); Tappan, New York, United States
- Occupation: Artist

Wilhelm Hunt Diederich (May 3, 1884 – May 14, 1953) was a German American sculptor and painter.

== Life ==
Wilhelm was born the son of German officer of the Prussian Army Ernst Curt Sigismond Diederich and his American wife Eleanor "Ellen", née Hunt. His father was killed in a hunting accident when Wilhelm was three years old.

Hunt Diederich was the son of an American mother—a member of the prominent Hunt family of Boston—and a Prussian cavalry officer. Diederich spent his early years on an estate in Hungary, where his father bred and trained horses for the Prussian army until his death in 1887. Diederich attended Swiss schools before coming to America in about 1900 to live with his maternal grandfather, the artist William Morris Hunt. [...] Diederich's art caught the eye of Gertrude Vanderbilt Whitney and her associate Juliana Force, who exhibited his work at the Whitney Studio Club (forerunner of the Whitney Museum of American Art). Throughout the 1920s Diederich's work was shown at several New York galleries, and in 1922 he was awarded the Gold Medal of the Architectural League for design and craftsmanship.

His work was part of the art competitions at the 1928 Summer Olympics and the 1932 Summer Olympics. After his marriage to a German countess, Diederich and his family lived in Bavaria until 1941 when they returned to the US due to World War II.

Diederich’s devotion to paper cutting, begun at the age of five, continued throughout his career. The paper cutouts proved to be closely related to his wrought-iron works. Because the two-dimensional, silhouetted, design-oriented aesthetic was identical in both mediums, the artist found he could experiment with forms in paper first, then easily transfer them to the more robust medium. This is not to imply the silhouettes were merely studies; they were indeed finished works in their own right. Both mediums conveyed the same fluidity and spontaneity, and thus were appreciated for the same reasons. The wrought-iron and silhouettes are simply two very different mediums with a shared aesthetic, making them inextricably entwined within the artist’s oeuvre. Diederich’s paper cutouts capture the distinctive sense of animation and vitality so specific to his art. They are elaborate, fragile, and cut with startling precision, transforming the simplest of mediums into works of great complexity. As with his wrought-iron, the forms are carefully attenuated and generalized, yet close inspection reveals an astounding degree of detail, leaving the viewer in awe of the skill and patience on display. These slender—as Brinton described, "aristocratic"—forms are similar to his friend Elie Nadelman’s, both significantly influenced by American folk art. Indeed, the urge to cut paper into decorative or narrative shapes and attach it to a contrasting background appears to be nearly universal among cultures with paper technology. The technique has been documented as early as first-century China. Straddling definition between art and craft, the process has different names in different languages—Wycinanki in Poland, Mon-Kiri in Japan, Decouper in France and Scherenschnitte in German-speaking Europe. The craft migrated to colonial America with immigrants from Germany and Switzerland who settled in Pennsylvania and became popularly known as the Pennsylvania Dutch (the latter, a corruption of "Deutsch" meaning German, the language they spoke). Paper cutting continues to thrive today, notably in German-speaking Switzerland.

== Personal life ==
Diederich first married "Maria"/"Mary" von Anders on 31 August 1912 with whom he had two children. They divorced in 1922. On 18 May 1924 in Berlin, he married his second wife, Wanda Luise Gräfin von Götzen, only daughter of Gustav Adolf von Götzen. Wanda Diederich died in late fall 1951 when the family home in Tappan burned down.

Burgthann Castle, bought by Wilhelm in the 1920s, was inherited by his daughter Diana (1930–2004), who sold her ownership of the castle to the municipality of Burgthann near Nuremberg (Bavaria) in 1988 Son Harold Michael (born 7 February 1933 in New York) was killed in action on 24 June 1952 as a Marine during the Korean War.
