= Helen M. Knowlton =

American painter (1832–1918)

Helen M. Knowton
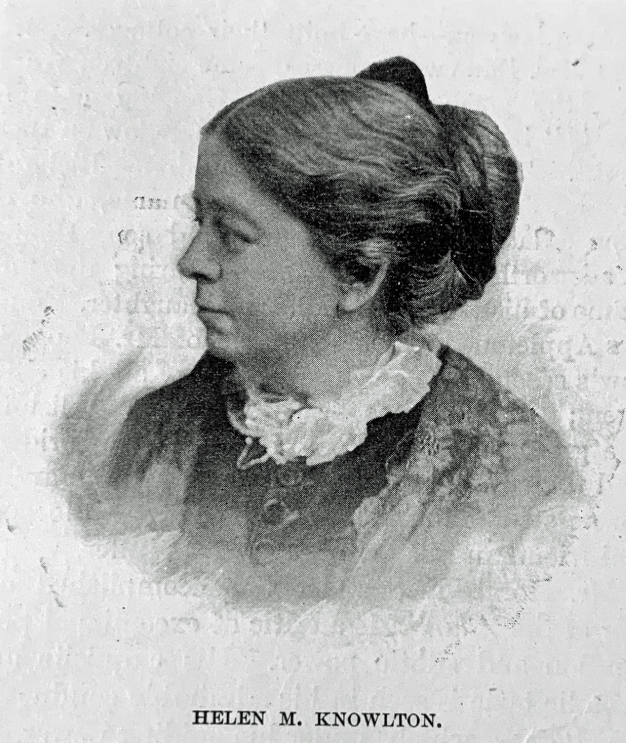
- Born: Helen Mary Knowlton; August 16, 1832; Littleton, Massachusetts
- Died: May 5, 1918 (aged 85); Needham, Massachusetts
- Resting place: Rural Cemetery, Worcester, Massachusetts; 42°16′51.29″N 71°48′7.08″W
- Education: William Morris Hunt
- Known for: Painter and educator

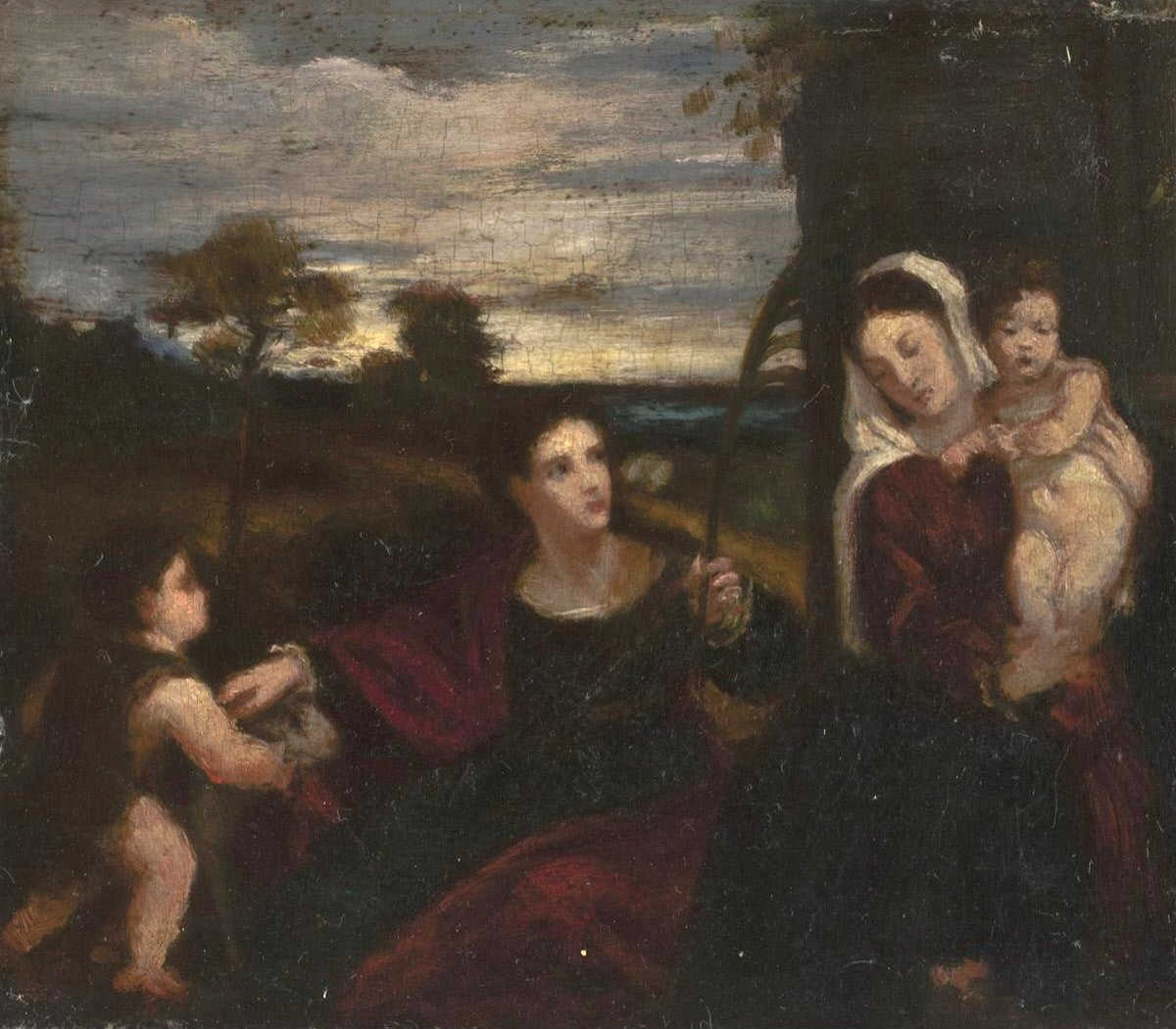
Helen Mary Knowlton, The Virgin, Jesus, Saint Agnes and St. John, after Titian (1477–1576). Date unknown (1848-1918). Worcester Art Museum

Helen Mary Knowlton (August 16, 1832 – May 5, 1918) was an American artist, art instructor and author. She taught in Boston from 1871 until the mid-1910s, when she was in her 70s. Her instructor and later employer, William Morris Hunt, was the subject of a portrait she made and several books; she is considered his principal biographer.

== Early life ==
Helen Mary Knowlton was born on August 16, 1832, in Littleton, Massachusetts, the second of nine children born to J.S.C and Anna W. Knowlton.

She was raised in Worcester, Massachusetts and attended private and public schools. Beginning in 1834, her father owned and ran the Worcester Palladium. He died in 1871 and after that the three Knowlton sisters ran the paper for a number of years.

For four years, beginning in 1865, she gave guitar lessons.

== Education ==
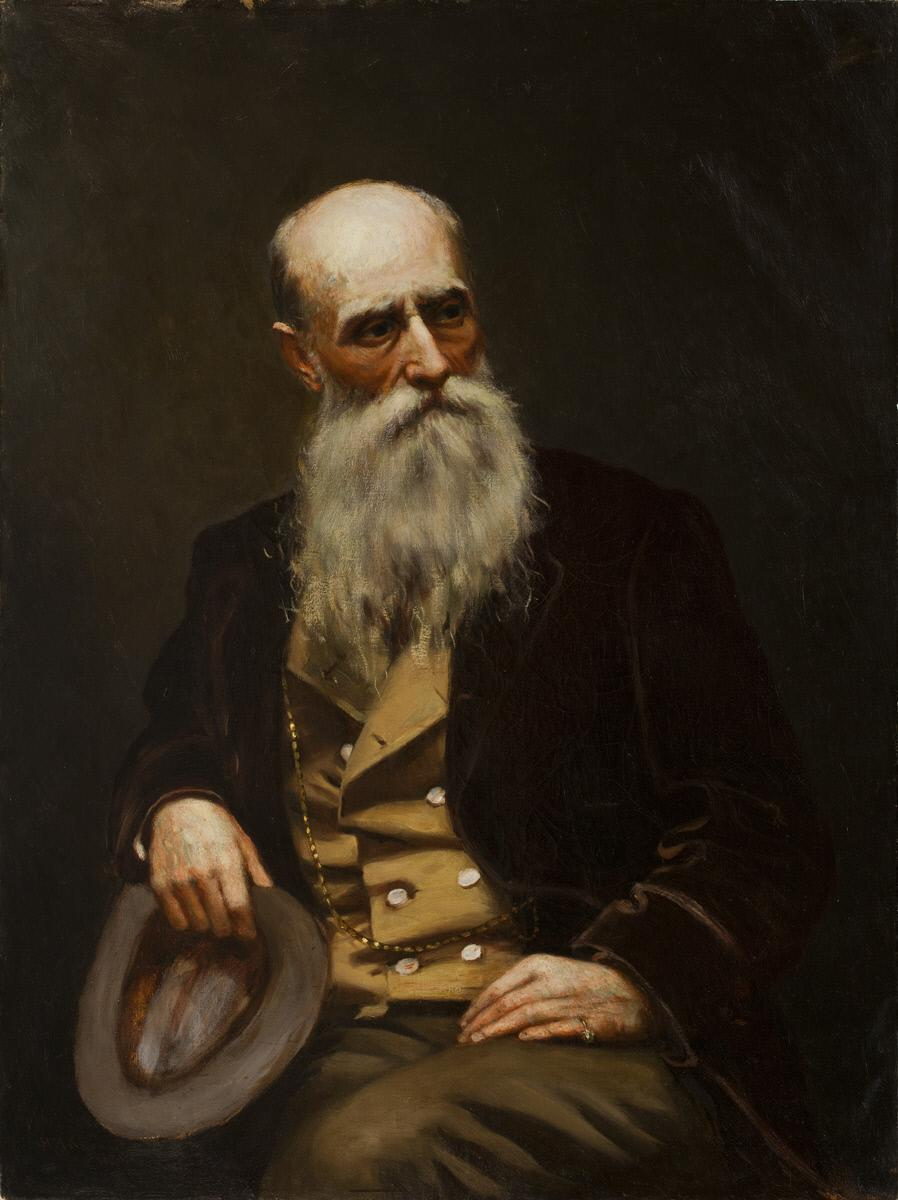
Helen Mary Knowlton, Portrait of William Morris Hunt, oil on canvas, 1880. Worcester Art Museum, Massachusetts, Gift of Helen M. Knowlton, 1896.

She studied under the supervision of artist and teacher William Morris Hunt, who had an "experimental approach" towards art, starting in 1868. Hunt began classes for women after she let him know of 40 women interested in studying art.

Despite criticism from those who thought he was wasting his time, Hunt offered his female students technical skills, inspiration, and a sense of self-worth. His efforts lived on through his pupil Helen Knowlton (1832–1918), who used his methods in her own classes for many years. Hunt empowered these early women artists, but Knowlton maintained their circle of support and friendship.

— Boston Women's Heritage Trail

In the 1880s she studied under Frank Duveneck in Munich, Germany.

In the summer of 1881 Knowlton was Duveneck's student in Gloucester, Massachusetts, where he held art classes "between trips to Europe." She wrote later of the time, having said "East Gloucester was never so full of artists, and was getting to be called the Brittany of America." In 1881 and 1882, Knowlton traveled through Italy, France, Belgium and the Netherlands with Ellen Day Hale, who was her student in 1874; also along for part of the journey was Hale's distant cousin, the painter Margaret Lesley Bush-Brown.

== Art career ==
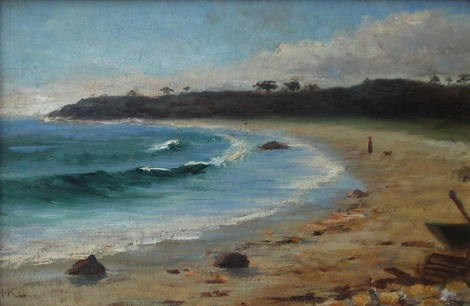
Beach scene, oil on board, 11 x 17", owned at one time by Essex Institute.

In Boston, Knowlton was a painter, educator, author, and art critic for the Boston Post and another paper in Boston. She was a painter, art critic, and teacher into her 70s, about mid-1910s.

=== Artist ===
Knowlton established a studio in Boston in 1867. She made oil paintings of portraits and landscapes and charcoal sketches. Her work was exhibited in London, New York at the National Academy of Design, Philadelphia at the Pennsylvania Academy of the Fine Arts, and in Boston between 1873 and 1897 at the Boston Art Club.

In 1878 a fire destroyed many of her paintings. She focused on landscapes initially and in 1880 began making portraits. Her first portrait, made of William Morris Hunt, was exhibited at the Museum of Fine Arts in Boston. It was acquired by the Worcester Art Museum in 1896, which opened in 1898. It was the museum's first collection addition.

Her works are in the Worcester Art Museum and Museum of Fine Arts, Boston in Massachusetts and the Telfair Museum of Art in Savannah, Georgia.

=== Educator and author ===
Knowlton, who had been William Morris Hunt's student, took over the drawing and painting class for Hunt in 1871, which she taught for four years. Starting in the summer of 1877 a studio in Magnolia was used for the class. One of her students was painter Ellen Day Hale; another was portraitist Marie Danforth Page.

Upon Hunt's death, Knowlton was a contributor a fund for a dedicated room of his works in the Museum of Fine Arts, Boston. She also helped to coordinate a retrospective of his work in Boston at the Museum of Fine Arts and was his "principal biographer."

She taught until about the mid-1910s, when she was in her 70s.

== Later years and death ==
In 1910 her sisters Francis, a drawing and painting teacher, and Lucy, a music teacher, lived with her on Pickering Street in Needham, Massachusetts. She died at 85 years of age on May 5, 1918, in Needham, Massachusetts. She is buried in Worcester at the Rural Cemetery.

== Legacy ==
The Smithsonian American Art Museum and National Portrait Gallery Library at the Smithsonian Institution has a collection of her papers. Her works were exhibited in 2001 in the "A Studio of Her Own: Women Artists in Boston 1870–1940" show at the Museum of Fine Arts in Boston.

== Works ==
=== Books and articles ===
Author

- Art Life of William Morris Hunt. Boston: Little, Brown. 1899.
- Hints for Pupils in Drawing and Painting, illustrated by William Morris Hunt. 1880.
- "William Morris Hunt." New England Magazine. 10, August 1894. pp. 685–705.

Compiled

- Hunts Talks on Art, Second Series. Boston: Houghton Mifflin. 1883

=== Paintings ===
- Antonio, pastel on sandpaper, date between 1850 and 1865, Worcester Art Museum
- Apple Blossoms
- Cacti
- Haystacks, oil on canvas, c. 1875, Museum of Fine Arts, Boston
- Landscape, after W.M. Hunt
- Ox Cart and Driver, oil, was owned by Worcester Art Museum in 1922.
- Portrait of William Morris Hunt, oil, 1880, Worcester Art Museum, Massachusetts
- Study of a Head, oil. Date unknown (1845–1918). Worcester Art Museum
- Sunset, York River
- The Virgin, Jesus, Saint Agnes and St. John, after Titian (1477–1576). Date unknown (1848-1918). Worcester Art Museum
