= Gloucester Harbor (William Morris Hunt) =

Painting by William Morris Hunt

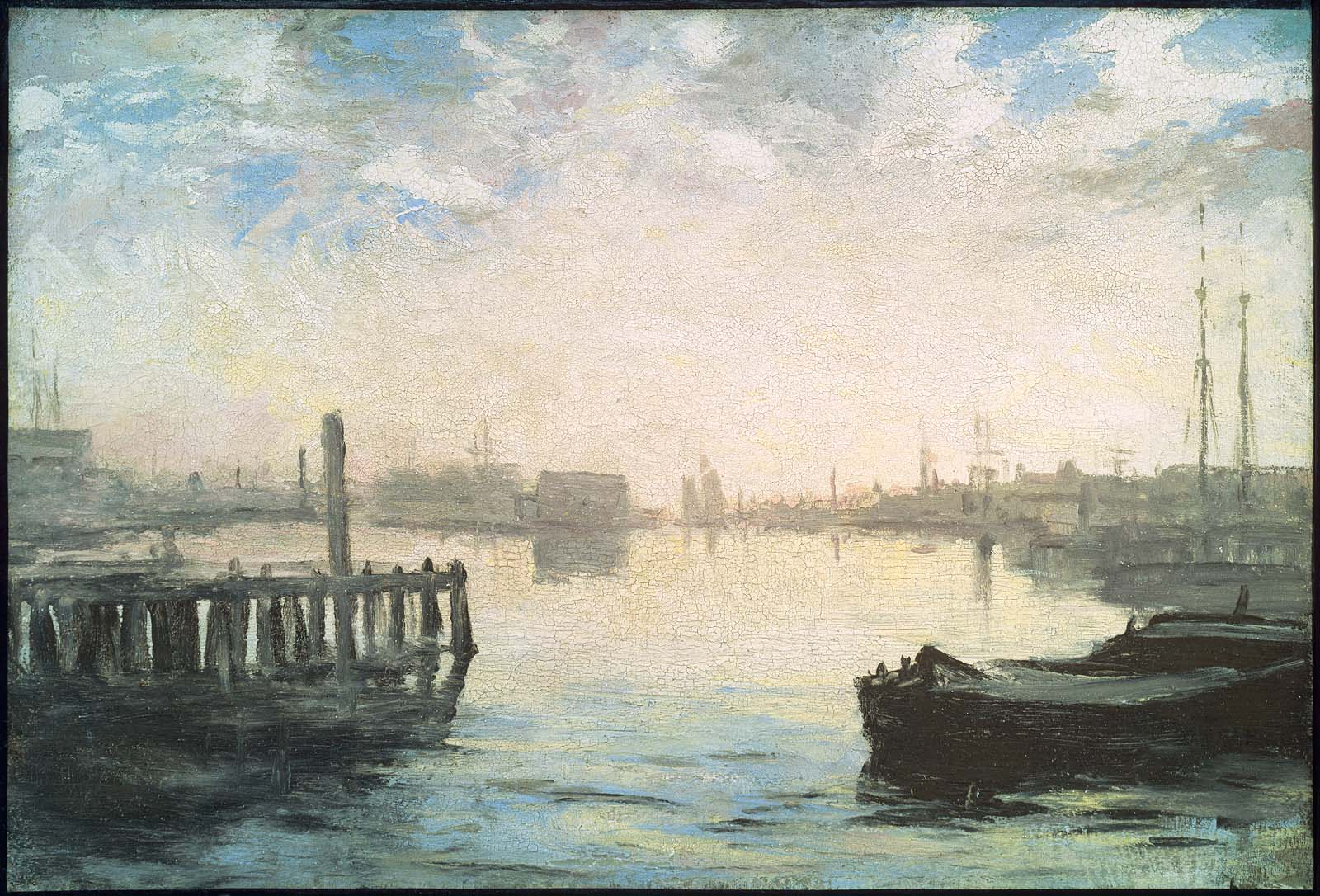
- Artist: William Morris Hunt
- Year: c. 1877
- Medium: Oil on canvas
- Dimensions: 53 cm × 79 cm (21 in × 31 in)
- Location: Museum of Fine Arts; Boston

Gloucester Harbor is a late 19th-century painting by American artist William Morris Hunt. Done in oil on canvas, the impressionist painting depicts morning in the harbor of Gloucester, a major fishing port in New England. The painting was one of Hunt's first forays into the school of impressionism, and the creation of Gloucester Harbor and several other impressionism-inflected works sparked Bostonian interest in the impressionist movement. The painting is currently on display at the Museum of Fine Arts.
