= Leavitt Hunt =

American lawyer

- Born: February 22, 1830; Brattleboro, Vermont, US
- Died: February 16, 1907 (aged 75–76); Weathersfield, Vermont, US
- Burial place: Weathersfield Bow Cemetery, Weathersfield, Vermont, US
- Military career
- Allegiance: United States of America; Union
- Branch: Union Army
- Rank: Colonel
- Units: 38th New York Volunteer Infantry Regiment, Army of the Potomac; Adjutant General's Corps; War Department
- Conflicts: American Civil War
- Other work: Photographer, attorney, farmer, inventor, art collector

Leavitt Hunts signature

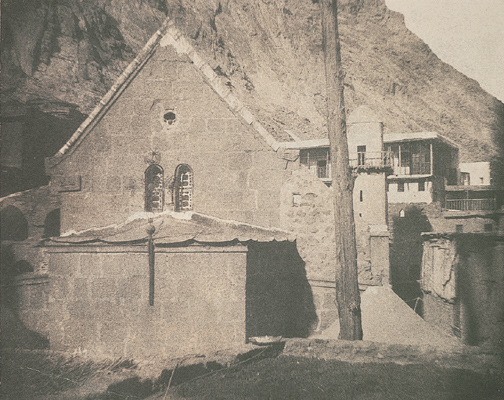
Saint Catherine's Monastery on Mount Sinai in Egypt photographed by Leavitt Hunt, first American to photograph the Middle East, 1852, George Eastman House

Leavitt Hunt (1831 – February 16, 1907) was a Harvard-educated attorney and photography pioneer who was one of the first people to photograph the Middle East. He and a companion, Nathan Flint Baker, traveled to Egypt, the Holy Land, Lebanon, Turkey and Greece on a Grand Tour in 1851–52, making one of the earliest photographic records of the Arab and ancient worlds, including the Great Sphinx and the Great Pyramid of Giza, views along the Nile River, the ruins at Petra and the Parthenon in Greece.

== Biography ==
The youngest son of General Jonathan Hunt of Vermont and the former Jane Maria Leavitt, and brother to architect Richard Morris Hunt and painter William Morris Hunt, (Note: "JONATHAN HUNT" (txt). Part 5 Early Hunts by Mitchell J. Hunt. ancestry.com. October 22, 1999.The fourth brother was Jonathan Leavitt, a graduate of the University of Paris who became a medical doctor in Paris. Like his brother, painter William Morris Hunt, Jonathan Hunt was an apparent suicide, at age forty-nine in Paris) Leavitt Hunt was born in Brattleboro, Vermont, but grew up in Paris following the early death of his father, a Vermont Congressman whose father had been the state's lieutenant governor.

Leavitt Hunt attended the Boston Latin School, and subsequently enrolled in a Swiss boarding school, finally taking a law degree from the University of Heidelberg. He then enrolled at the Swiss Military Academy in Thun. Hunt was fluent in French, German, Italian, Latin, Greek and Hebrew, and could write in both Persian and Sanskrit. (Note: Known as the scholar in the family, Hunt was offered a professorship at Princeton, then known as the College of New Jersey, but turned it down in favor of his interests in the law, travel and the arts.)

Hunt's companion on his Middle Eastern journey was a wealthy sculptor from Ohio and friend of the Hunt family. Nathan Flint Baker had been travelling in Europe for a decade, and announced his intention to travel through the Middle East. Hunt decided to join him, meeting him in Florence, Italy, in late September 1851.

Hunt and Baker spent several weeks in Rome practicing photography, and then sailed from Naples to Malta and eventually up the Nile River into the Sinai Peninsula, to Petra (where they were among the first to photograph the ruins), then on to Jerusalem, to what is today Lebanon, then on to Constantinople and Athens, before returning to Paris in May 1852.

Hunt's and Baker's photographs were dazzling, especially for a brand-new medium many had never seen before. They photographed the Great Sphinx and the Pyramids at Giza, the temple complex at Karnak, the Ramesseum at Thebes, and the ruins on the Island of Philae. They travelled farther to photograph the Saint Catherine's Monastery on Mount Sinai, the tombs and temples of Petra, the Church of the Holy Sepulchre in Jerusalem, the ruins at Baalbek, and finally the buildings of the Acropolis in Athens.

The 60 extant photographs from their journey show that Hunt and Baker were keen on the new medium and familiar with its techniques. It was a real partnership: both men brought their own strengths to the process, and images that survive demonstrate their aesthetic acumen as well as their journalistic desire to show the settings in which they worked. One image of an unveiled Ghawazee female dancer, signed on the negative by Hunt himself, is likely the earliest photographic portrait of a Middle Eastern woman. Another image of the less photogenic view from the rear of the Parthenon demonstrates two men unafraid to indulge their take on a revered landmark.

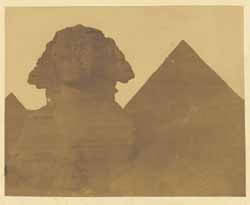
The Great Sphinx and the Great Pyramid at Giza, calotype photograph by Leavitt Hunt, circa 1852, The Library of Congress

The trip was a logistical challenge. Accompanying the two travelers for part of the journey were Leavitt Hunt's older brother, the architect Richard Morris Hunt, and two other friends. The group hired a dahaheah (Note: Nezar AlSayyad (January 25, 2001). Consuming tradition, manufacturing heritage: global norms and urban forms in the Age of Tourism (txt). Routledge. p. 116. ISBN 9780415239417. A dahaheah was a large houseboat with triangular cross-sails. The rear of the boat sported a cabin, where the chartering party could sleep. Typically, they took their meals on the roof of the cabin under a large awning. This means of conveyance was typically used by English and other foreign tourists on the Nile in the nineteenth century. The crew consisted of a dozen or more men, who cooked, captained the vessel and shopped in the bazaars for supplies.) and a crew of 13 Egyptians to take them down the Nile River. Architect Hunt, later famous for his Gilded Age Newport palazzos, painted and made sketches along the Nile while his younger brother and Baker took photographs. (The results were later shown at a 1999 exhibition in Washington, D.C.)

Following their arduous journey, the pair of no-longer-neophyte photographers returned to Paris and made prints from their 18x24 cm negatives which were made using a waxed-paper process. Having developed the negatives, each man kept a personal album of the prints. The young Hunt showed his to the German naturalist and explorer Alexander von Humboldt, who brought them to the attention of the King of Prussia, and Hunt made a formal gift of 11 prints to Karl Richard Lepsius, the German founder of the study of ancient Egyptology. Baker left his album with a New York dealer to discern commercial interest in the prints.

Following their extraordinary journey, the two men took divergent paths. Baker returned to Cincinnati, Ohio, to enjoy the life of a wealthy aesthete, while Hunt completed his studies at the Swiss Military Institute, then returned to America, where he took a second law degree, this one from Harvard. He began practicing law in New York City, the home of his brother Richard Morris Hunt, until the outbreak of the American Civil War, when he enlisted as lieutenant on the staff of General Heintzelman. Eventually he was promoted to lieutenant colonel for bravery at the Battle of Malvern Hill. Hunt subsequently attained the rank of full colonel and assistant adjutant general in the Union Army.

Following the Civil War, Leavitt Hunt returned to New York City and his law practice for several years, until he retired in 1867 to Weathersfield, Vermont, where his wife Katherine Jarvis had inherited the estate belonging to her father William Jarvis, a prominent Vermont businessman and diplomat best known as the first importer of Merino sheep into America.

Leavitt Hunt purchased his own estate at nearby Weathersfield Bow and became a gentleman farmer. Hunt was particularly interested in the rare breeds of Dutch cattle that he raised, as well as the white pine forests he propagated on his estate, which he dubbed Elmsholme. During his retirement as a farmer, Hunt also became an inventor, with several patents for new plows.

As far as is known, neither Hunt nor his companion Baker ever showed much interest in the photographic medium after their journey. Their prints are rarely seen, very scarce, and are among the most valuable early photographic images. Hunt's personal album is now in the collection of the Bennington Art Museum, Bennington, Vermont. Baker's album evidently disappeared. The collection of photos presented to Egyptologist Richard Lepsius is housed at the Museum Ludwig's AgfaPhoto-Historama in Cologne, Germany.

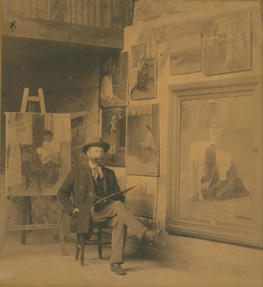
Artist Clyde du Vernet Hunt, son of Col. Leavitt Hunt, in his Paris studio, c. 1900

Hunt's personal negatives are believed lost, but the prints he made became the property of his brother Richard Morris Hunt and were donated to the American Institute of Architects. The photos are now at the Library of Congress, Prints & Photographs Division in Washington, D.C. A 1999 show at the American Architectural Foundation's Octagon Museum showcased Leavitt Hunt's 1853 journey. Entitled "A Voyage of Discovery: The Nile Journal of Richard Morris Hunt", the exhibition consisted of seventy of Leavitt Hunt's original photographic prints, as well as drawings and watercolors by Richard Morris Hunt from the museum's Prints and Drawings Collection.

Some of Leavitt Hunt's personal prints were donated by his family after his death to the Library of Congress, where they are part of the permanent photographic collection. There are also a few original prints from this early Middle East trip in the Hallmark Photographic Collection and at the George Eastman House in Rochester, New York. Harvard University's Harrison D. Horblit Collection of Early Photography also owns several of the works by Hunt and Baker.

Although Leavitt Hunt never returned to photography, he remained vitally interested in the arts until the end of his life, corresponding with fellow Harvard-educated lawyer and author Henry Dwight Sedgwick, as well as other intellectuals of the era. He and his wife travelled frequently, often crossing paths with family friends like Joseph Hodges Choate and Thomas Jefferson Coolidge. He also wrote poetry on the side.

Perhaps the highest tribute paid Leavitt Hunt and his brothers was that of Ralph Waldo Emerson. "The remarkable families", Emerson wrote, were "the three Jackson brothers....the three Lowell brothers....the four Lawrences....the Cabots....the three Hunts, William, Richard and Leavitt (William Hunt tells also of his brother John, in Paris); the Washburns, three governors, I believe."

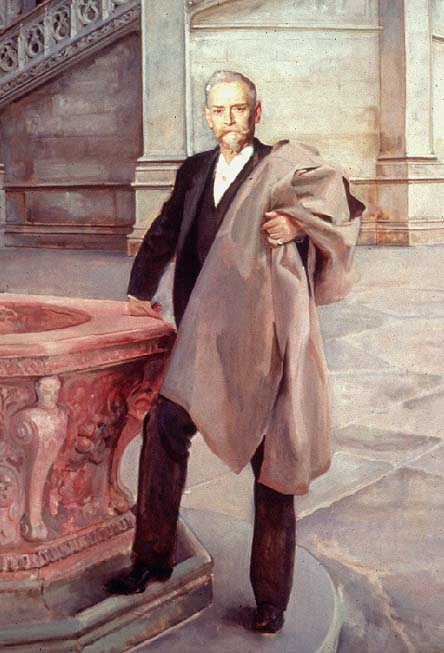
American architect Richard Morris Hunt, painted by John Singer Sargent. Richard Morris Hunt accompanied brother Leavitt on their trip down the Nile, 1853

Clyde du Vernet Hunt, who graduated from Andover and Harvard Law School, and subsequently became a painter and sculptor accepted by the Paris Salon, was the son of Leavitt Hunt and his wife, the former Katherine Jarvis. A portrait of Leavitt Hunt painted by his brother William Morris Hunt in 1874 is in the permanent collection of the Brooks Memorial Library, Brattleboro's main library. Artist William Morris Hunt sketched other members of his brother Leavitt's family as well. Jarvis Hunt, another son of Col. Hunt and his wife, became a noted Chicago architect.

Leavitt Hunt's wife Katherine, daughter of businessman William Jarvis, died June 6, 1916, at Lakewood, New Jersey, and was interred with her husband at Weathersfield. Leavitt Hunt predeceased his wife, dying at Weathersfield on February 16, 1907. The couple's infant son Morris Hunt, who died in 1871, is interred with his parents.

== See also ==
- Richard Morris Hunt
- William Morris Hunt
- Jarvis Hunt
- Thaddeus Leavitt
- Jonathan Hunt (Vermont Representative)
- Jonathan Hunt (Vermont Lieutenant Governor)
- United States Sanitary Commission
