= Jarvis Hunt =

American architect

- Born: August 6, 1863; Weathersfield, Vermont, U.S.
- Died: June 15, 1941 (aged 77); St. Petersburg, Florida, U.S.
- Education: Harvard University; Massachusetts Institute of Technology
- Occupation: Architect
- Spouse: M. Louise Coleman
- Children: Louise Hunt McMurtry Cilley; Jarvis Hunt Jr.
- Parent(s): Leavitt Hunt; Katherine (Jarvis) Hunt
- Buildings: Kansas City Union Station; Joliet Union Station
- Projects: National Golf Links of America Golf Course; Chicago Golf Club

Jarvis Hunt (August 6, 1863 – June 15, 1941) was a Chicago architect who designed a wide array of buildings, including railroad stations, suburban estates, industrial buildings, clubhouses and other structures.

== Biography ==
Hunt was born in Weathersfield, Vermont, and attended Harvard University and the Massachusetts Institute of Technology.

He had a passion for golf and qualified for the 1904 Olympics Golf Team, but failed to make the cut. Hunt later designed the clubhouses of several clubs, including the National Golf Links of America Golf Course, of which he was a founding member, and the Chicago Golf Club.

Most of his projects are associated with the United States Midwest, including the Kansas City Union Station and the Joliet Union Station. Hunt based his architectural firm in Chicago's Monadnock Building.

Hunt retired to his home in St. Petersburg, Florida in 1927. He died on June 15, 1941, in St. Petersburg.

== Family life ==
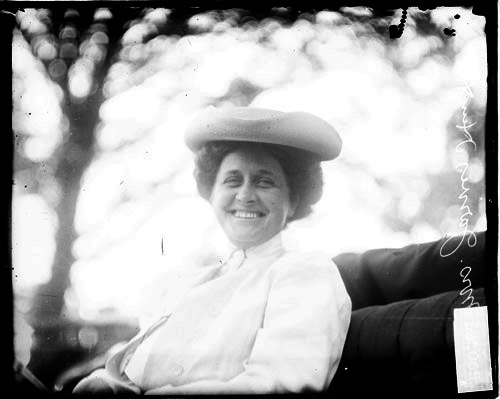
Mrs. Jarvis Hunt at a Chicago horse show, 1908

Hunt was the son of attorney, farmer and photography pioneer Colonel Leavitt Hunt and his wife, Katherine (Jarvis) Hunt. His uncles were New York City architect Richard Morris Hunt and Boston painter William Morris Hunt, and his grandfathers were U.S. congressman Jonathan Hunt and diplomat William Jarvis.

Hunt and his wife, the former M. Louise Coleman, had two children: Louisa Hunt McMurtry and Jarvis Hunt Jr. Jarvis Hunt and his wife later divorced, and he was awarded custody of his two children.

== Projects ==
- Vermont Building, World's Columbian Exposition, 1893
- Arbor Lodge, Nebraska City, Nebraska, 1903
- Chicago and Alton Depot, Marshall, Missouri, 1906
- Naval Station Great Lakes, 39 original buildings, 1903–1927
- Union Pacific headquarters, Omaha, Nebraska, 1910
- Gulf, Colorado and Santa Fe Railway depot, Temple, Texas, 1910
- Indianapolis News Building, 1910 (National Register)
- Kansas City Star Building 1910 (National Register)
- Joliet Union Station, 1911–13 (National Register)
- 16th Street Station, Oakland, California, 1912 (National Register)
- Union Station (Kansas City), 1913 (National Register)
- Commerce Trust Building, Kansas City, Missouri, 1914 (National Register)
- Ayers Bank Building, Jacksonville, Illinois, 1914 (National Register)
- Dallas Union Station, 1914–1916 (National Register)
- Newark Museum, 1923–26
- Hecht's Department Store, Washington, D.C.
- Chicago Golf Club Clubhouse, Wheaton, Illinois
- Bamberger's Department Store, now 165 Halsey Street, Newark, New Jersey
- National Golf Links of America Clubhouse, Southampton, New York
- Walden, Estate of Cyrus H. McCormick II, Lake Forest, Illinois, 1896 (main house demolished, 1950s)

== Gallery ==
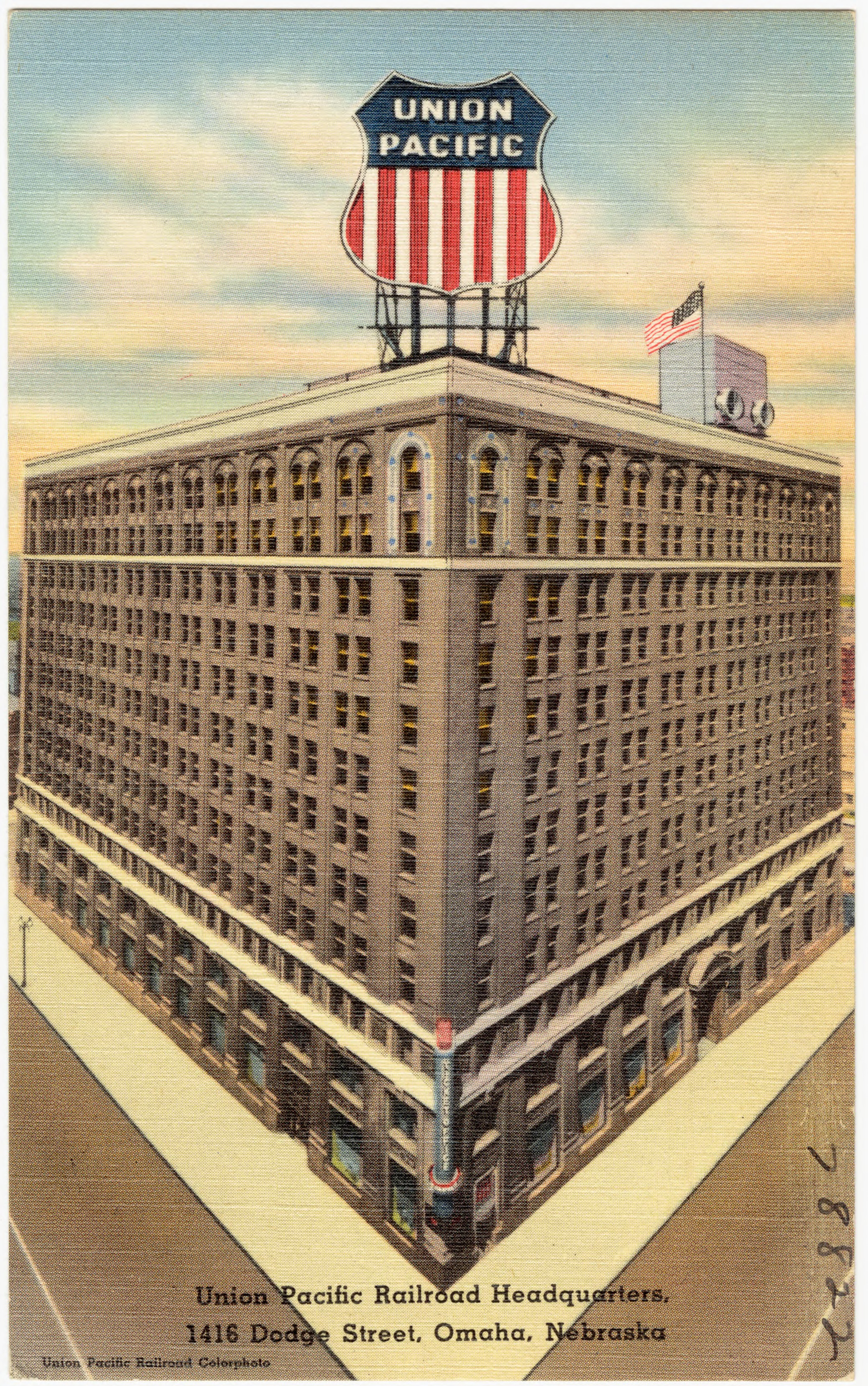
Union Pacific Railroad Headquarters Building, Omaha, Nebraska

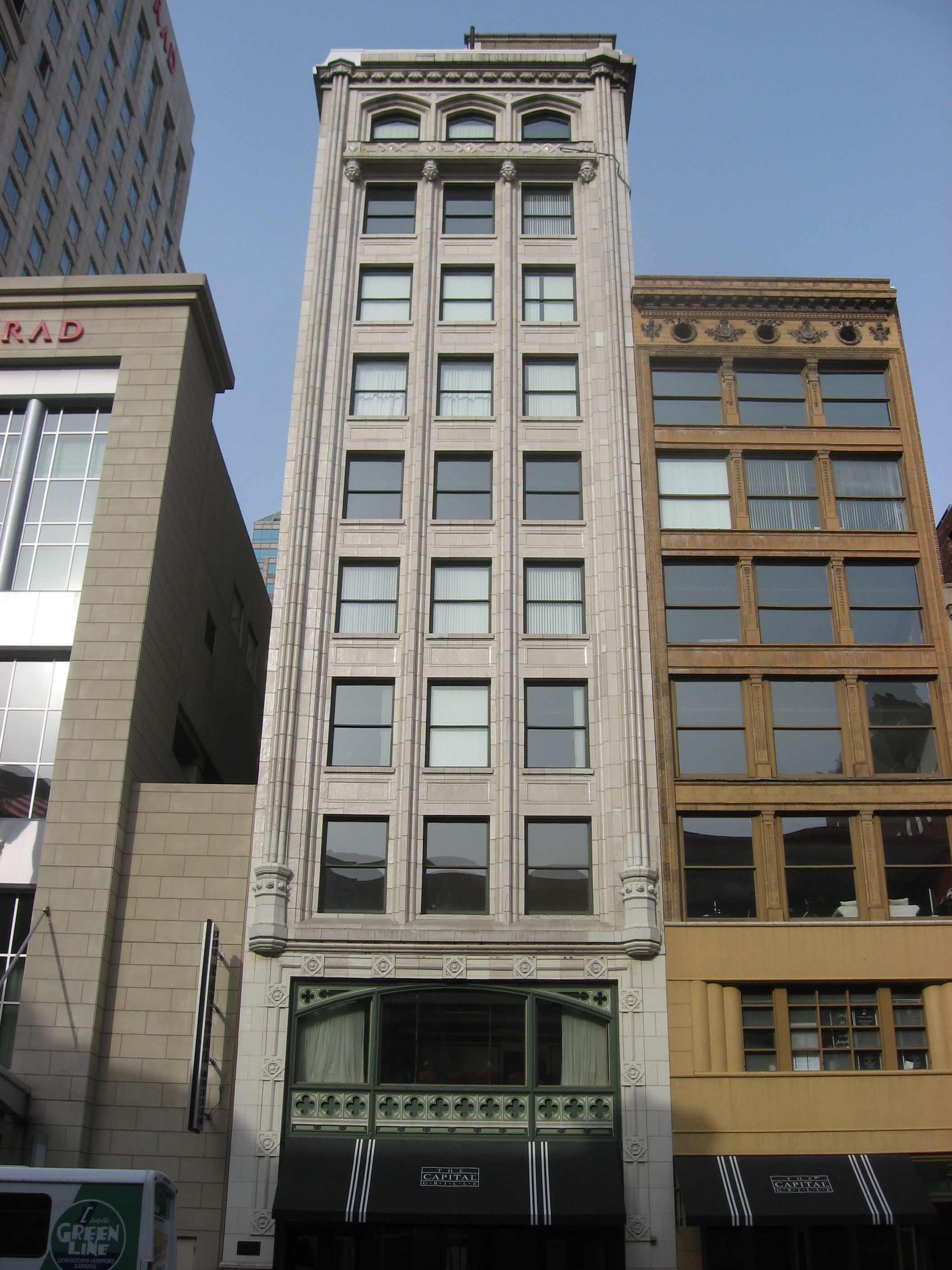
Indianapolis News Building, Indianapolis, Indiana

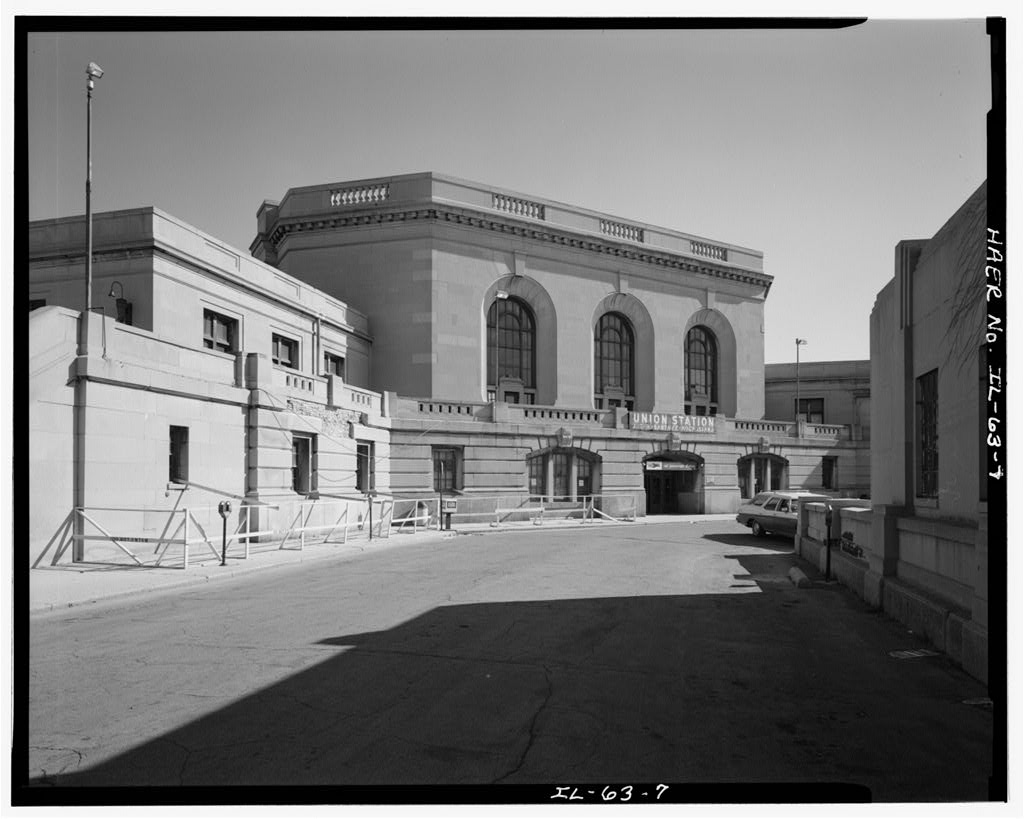
Union Station, Joliet, Illinois

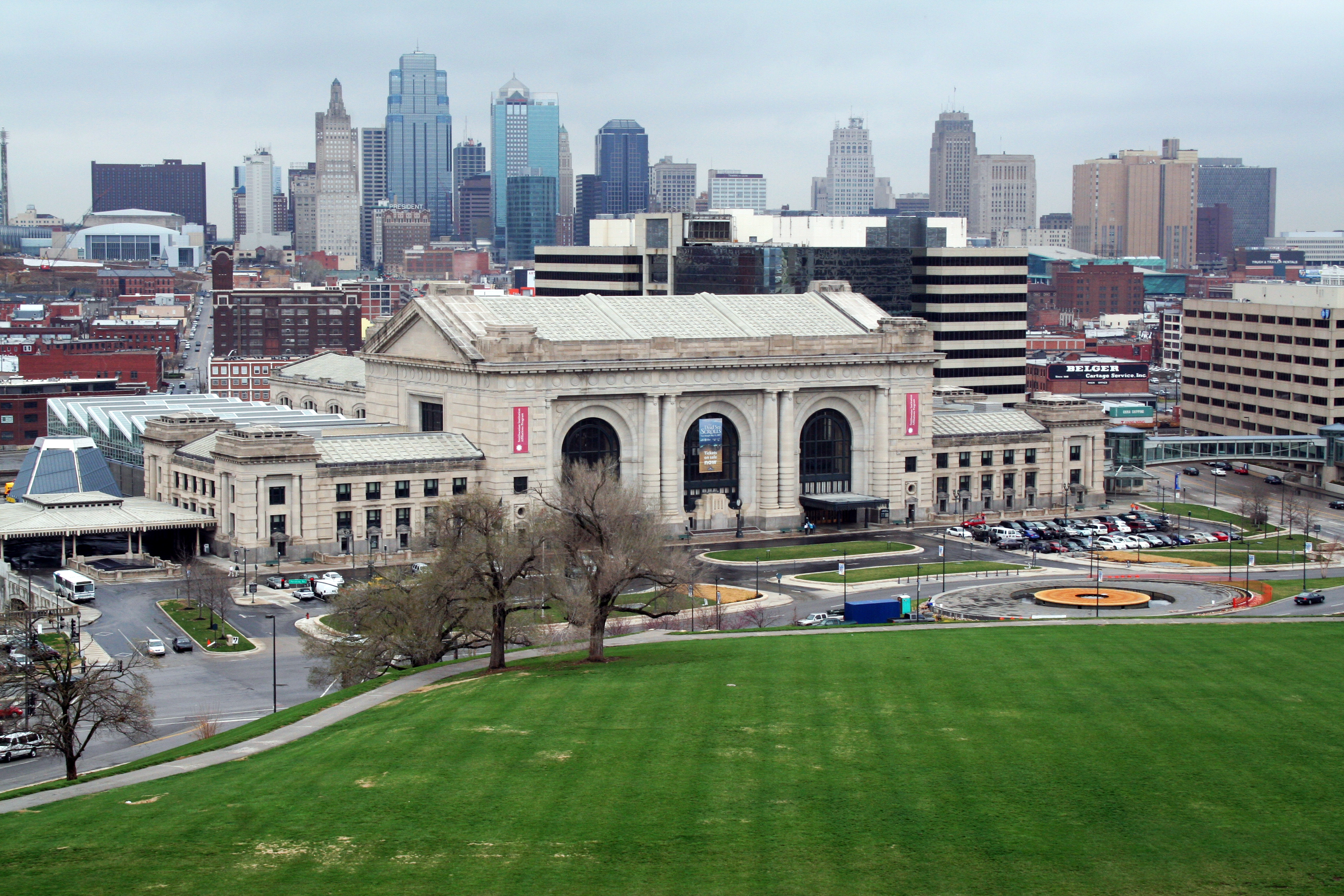
Union Station in Kansas City

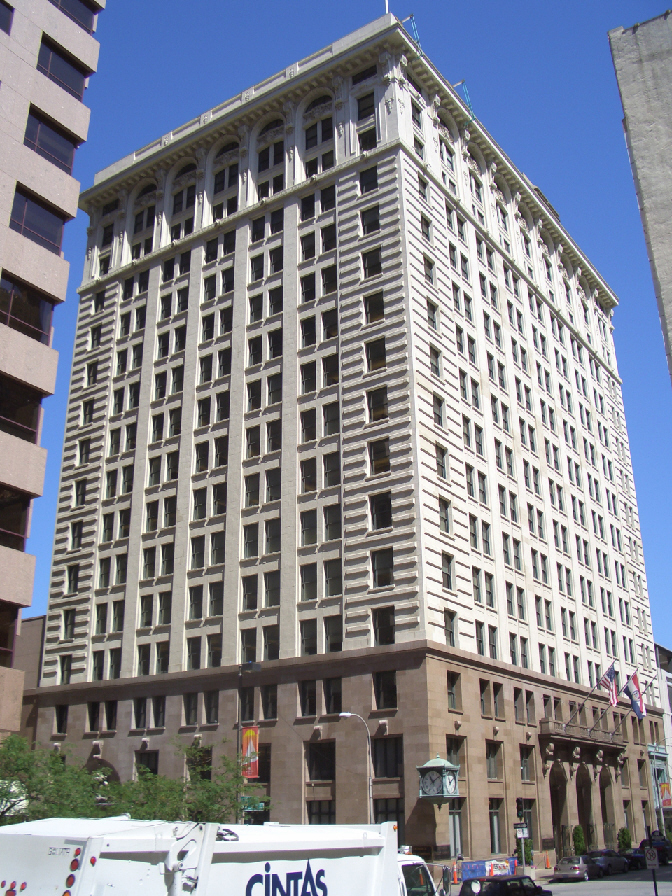
Commerce Trust Building, Kansas City, Missouri

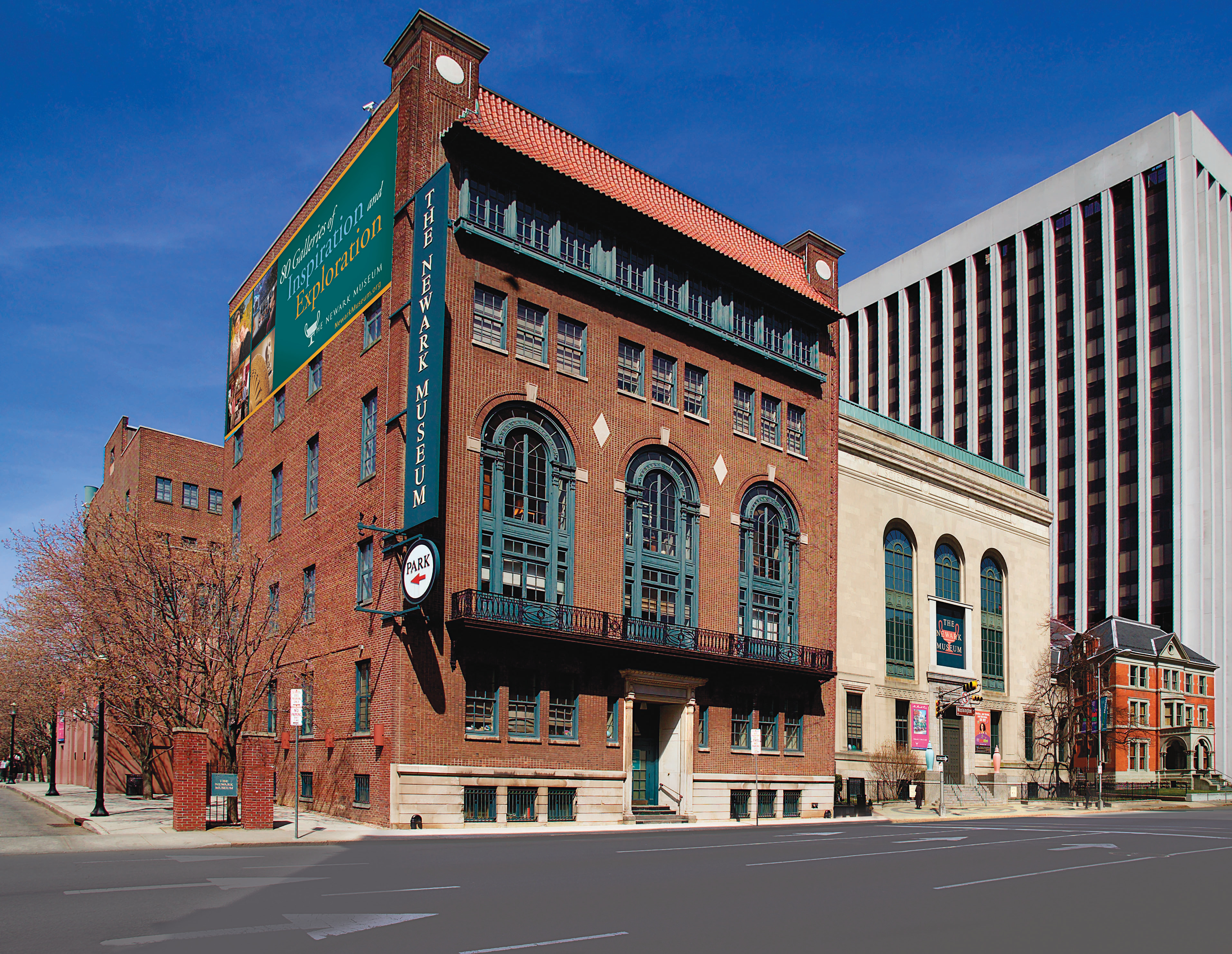
Newark Museum

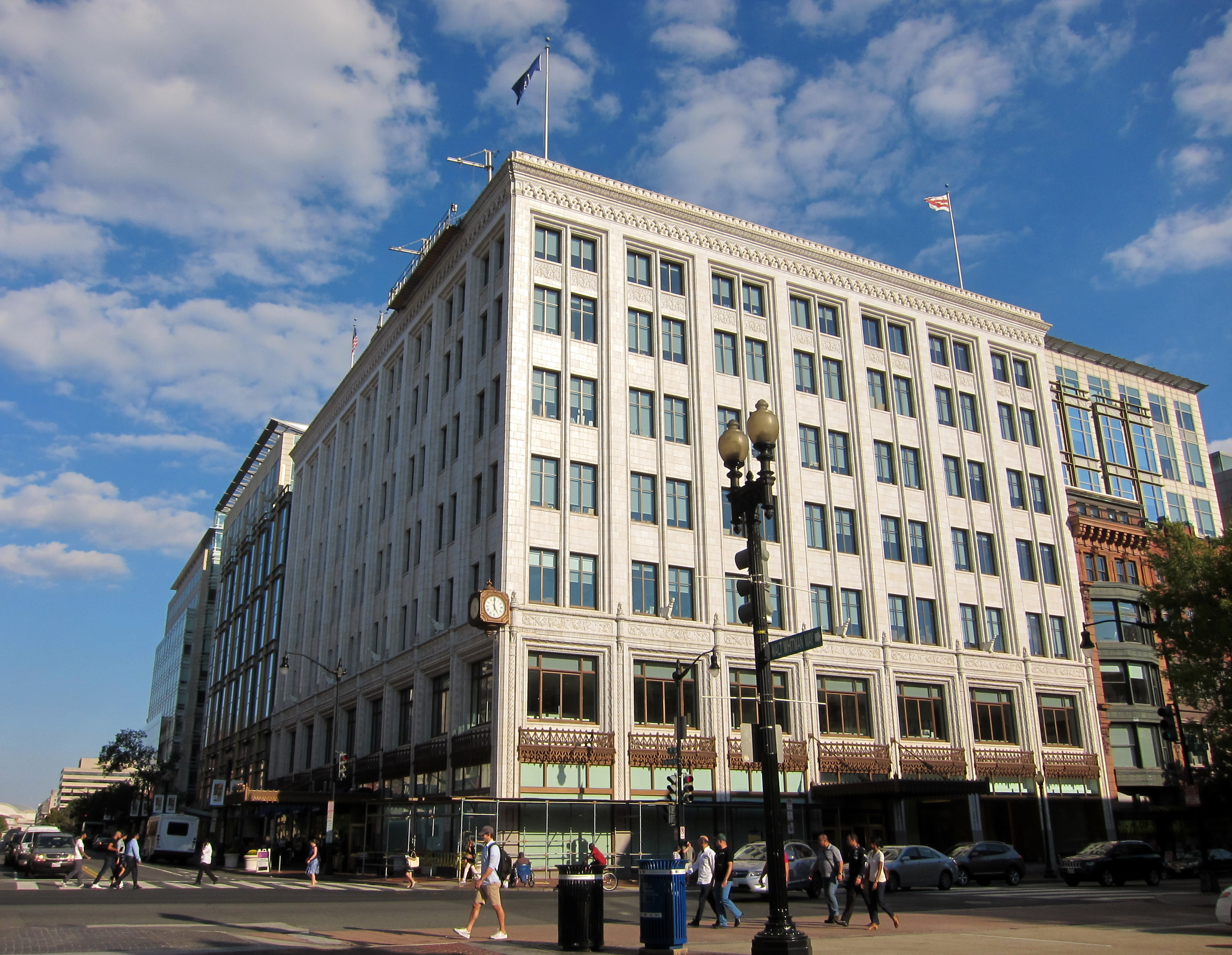
Hecht's Department Store, Washington, D.C.

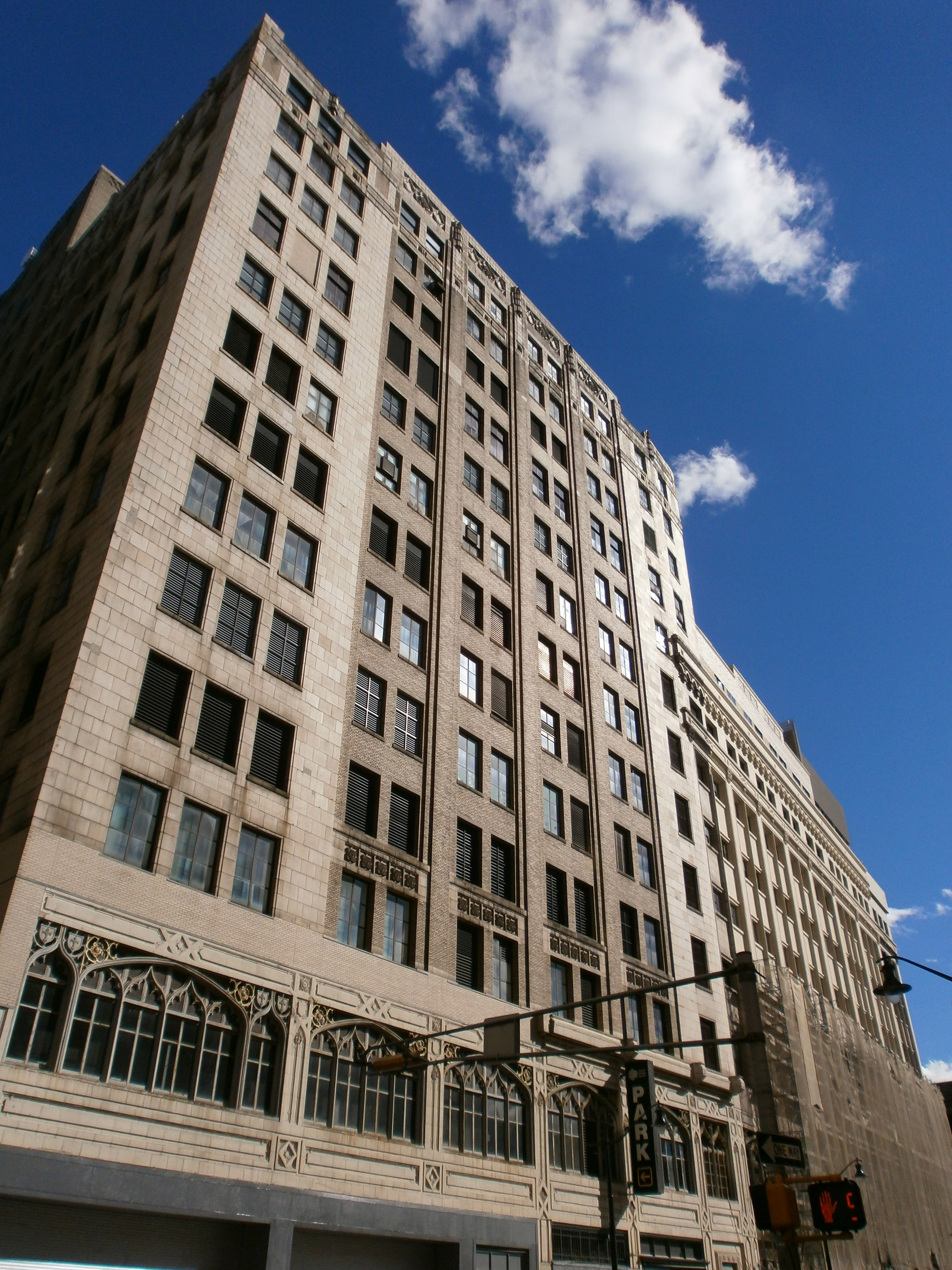
Bamberger's Department Store, Newark, New Jersey

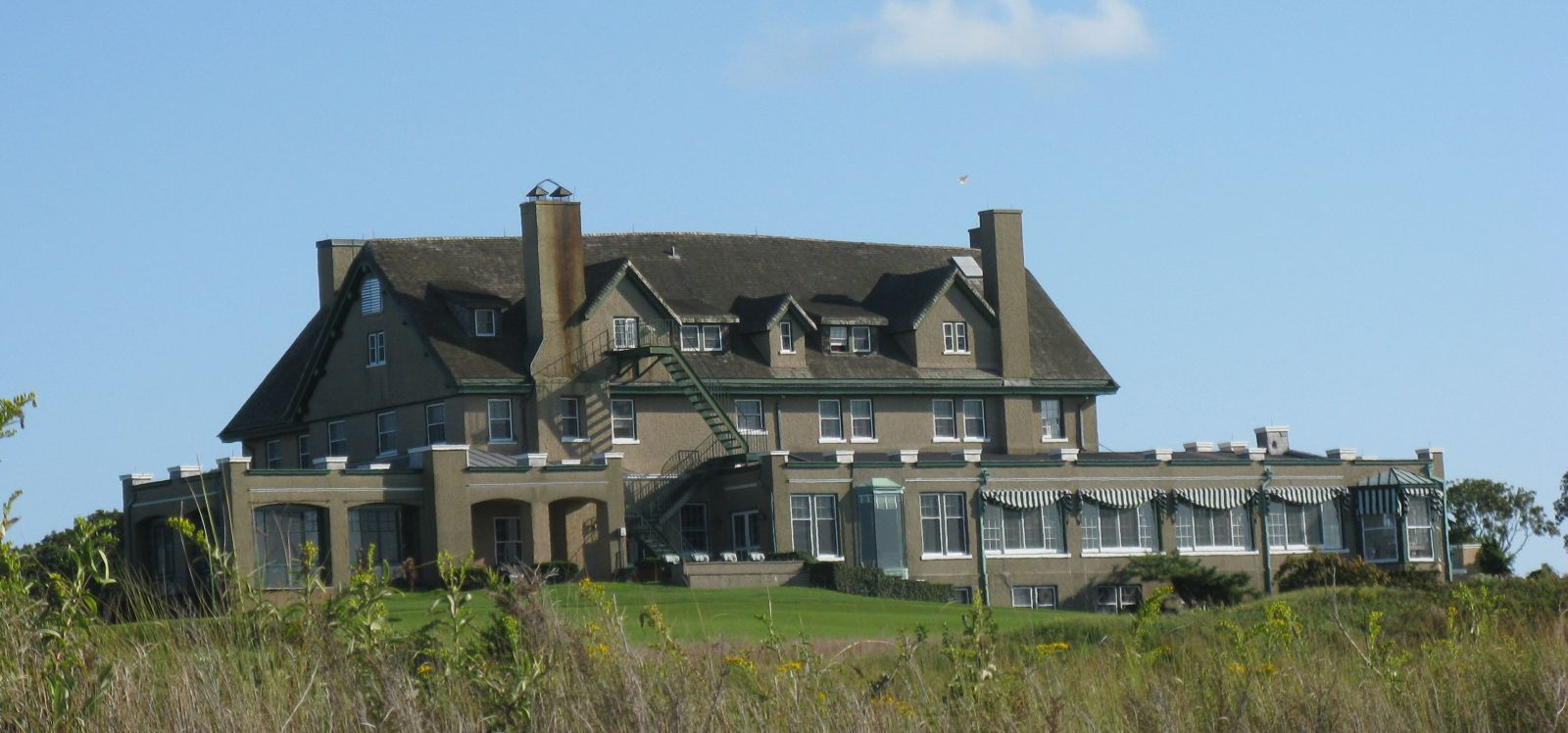
National Golf Links of America
