= Jonathan Hunt (Vermont lieutenant governor) =

American politician (1738–1823)

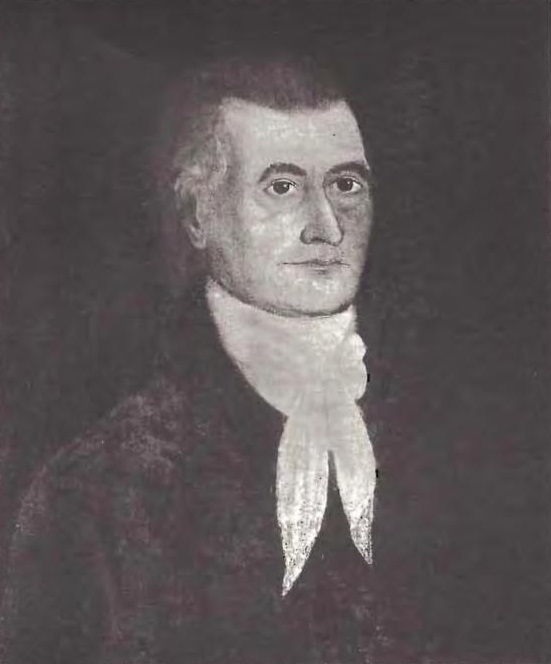
- Hunt as depicted in Volume V (1891) of the Vermont Historical Gazetteer

2nd Lieutenant Governor of Vermont
- In office 1794–1796
- Governor: Thomas Chittenden
- Preceded by: Peter Olcott
- Succeeded by: Paul Brigham

Personal details
- Born: September 12, 1738 Northfield, Massachusetts
- Died: June 1, 1823 (aged 84) Vernon, Vermont
- Resting place: North Vernon Cemetery, North Vernon, Vermont
- Citizenship: US
- Spouse: Lavinia (Swan) Hunt
- Relations: John Webster; Benjamin Swan; Timothy Swan; Lewis R. Morris
- Children: Ellen Francis Hunt; Anne Hunt; Lavina S. Hunt; Jonathan Hunt
- Parent(s): Samuel Strong Hunt; Ann (Ellsworth) Hunt
- Profession: Landowner; Politician

Jonathan Hunt (September 12, 1738 – June 1, 1823) was an American pioneer, landowner and politician from Vernon, Vermont. He served as second lieutenant governor of Vermont and was a member of the prominent Hunt family of Vermont.

== Early life ==
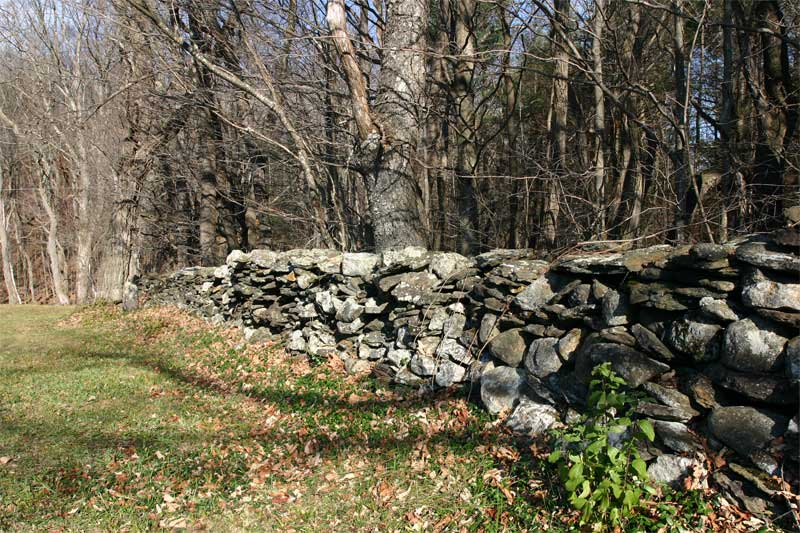
Rural Guilford, Vermont, where Hunt began clearing land in 1758

Hunt was born in Northfield, Massachusetts, the son of Captain Samuel Strong Hunt of Northampton and Ann (Ellsworth) Hunt of Windsor, Connecticut. He was one of the earliest settlers of Vermont, and he began clearing land at Guilford, Vermont in 1758.

There are indications that the Hunt family had ties to Vermont even earlier, when Hunt's grandfather Jonathan witnessed a 1687 Massachusetts deed conferring land in what was later Vermont by several Native Americans. Hunt's father, Captain Samuel, had himself been the proprietor named in the charter of many New Hampshire towns.

Hunt and his associates were granted extensive tracts of land by New Hampshire Governor Benning Wentworth, as well as by patent from New York State and by purchase.

== Political career ==
Hunt held various political positions in Vermont, and served as sheriff of Windham County in 1781. He was high sheriff in 1782, and judge of the Windham County Court in 1783. He served as lieutenant governor of the state of Vermont from 1794 to 1796. In 1800, Hunt served as one of Vermont's presidential electors; Vermont was carried by the Federalists, and Hunt cast his ballots for Federalist candidates John Adams and Charles Cotesworth Pinckney.

Hunt is considered one of the founders of Vermont as well as one of its earliest pioneers and largest landowners. He lived in Vernon, Vermont, the name suggested by his wife Lavinia (Swan) Hunt, a Massachusetts native and former pupil of President John Adams.

== Vernon, Vermont ==
When Hunt was instructed by the Vermont General Assembly to change the name of the town he represented from Hinsdale to Huntstown in his honor, he demurred. He asked his wife, who suggested "Vernon" instead, making it the only Vermont town said to be named by a woman. The Governor Hunt House, built by Hunt in 1779, and once featured in Herbert W. Congdon's "Old Vermont Houses," is now on the grounds of the Vermont Yankee Nuclear Power Plant.

== Death and legacy ==
Hunt died in Vernon on June 1, 1823. Governor Hunt Road in Vernon, Vermont is named for Hunt.

== Family life ==
Hunt was the great-great-grandson of Jonathan Hunt and his wife Mary Webster, daughter of Governor John Webster of the Connecticut Colony.

Hunt's brother General Arad Hunt, who also lived in Vernon, was general of the Vermont militia, a member of the Westminster Convention of 1777, and a prominent early backer of Middlebury College, to which he donated over 5,000 acres (20 km^{2}) of land in Albany, Vermont. He and his brother were among the largest speculators in Vermont lands, owning tens of thousands of acres across the state.

Hunt married Lavinia Swan on July 15, 1779. They had four children: Ellen Francis Hunt, Anne Hunt, Lavina S. Hunt and Jonathan Hunt. Their son was a U.S. congressman from Vermont, and their daughter Ellen was married to Lewis R. Morris, U.S. congressman from Vermont and nephew of statesman Gouverneur Morris.

Hunt's brother-in-law Benjamin Swan served as Vermont's state treasurer for many years. His brother-in-law Timothy Swan was an eccentric composer and poet who lived in Suffield, Connecticut. His family became one of the most prominent in the entire state.

Political offices
Preceded by Peter Olcott	Lieutenant Governor of Vermont; 1794–1796	Succeeded by Paul Brigham
