= Vernon, Vermont =

- Town
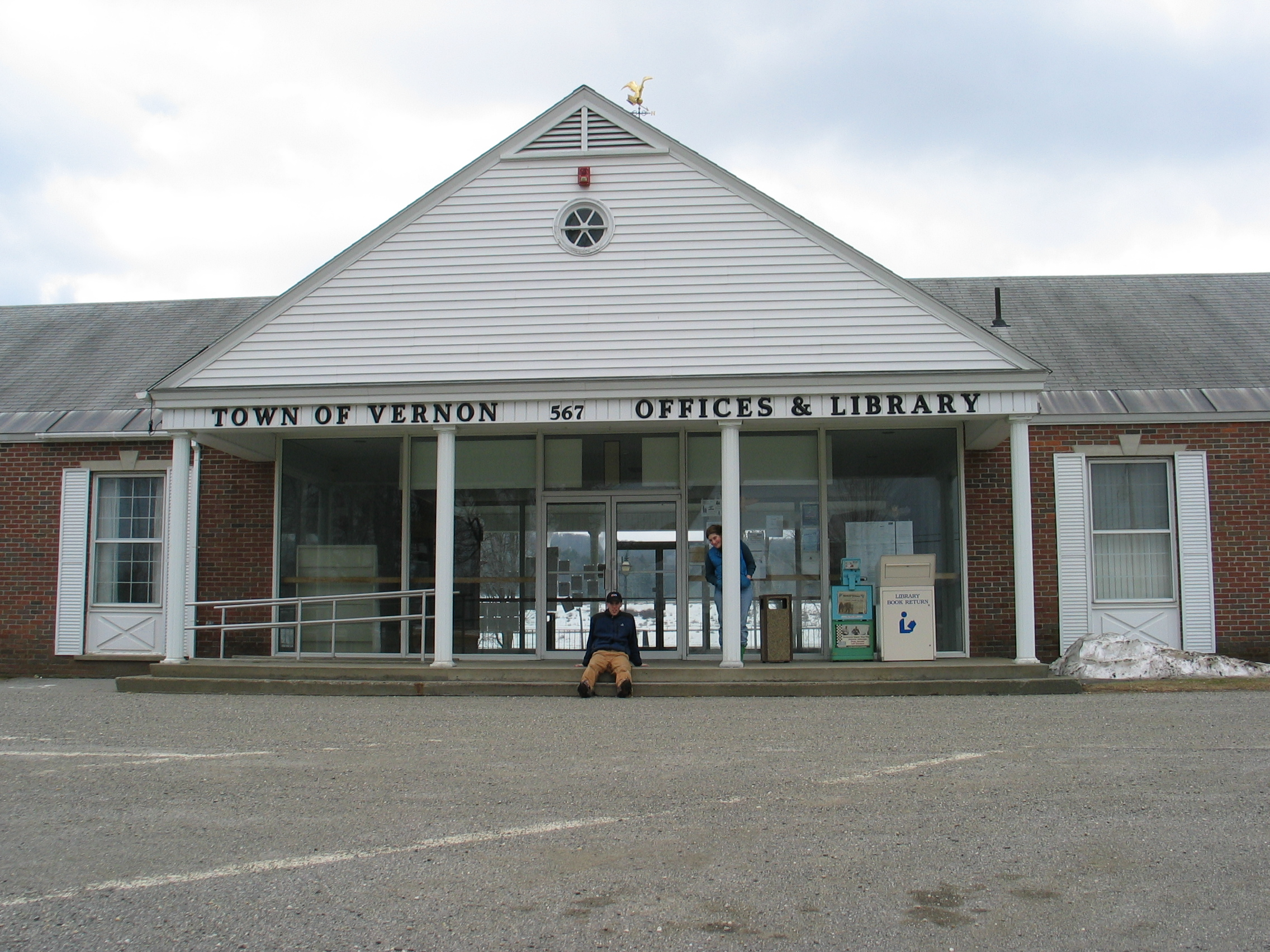
- Vernon offices and library

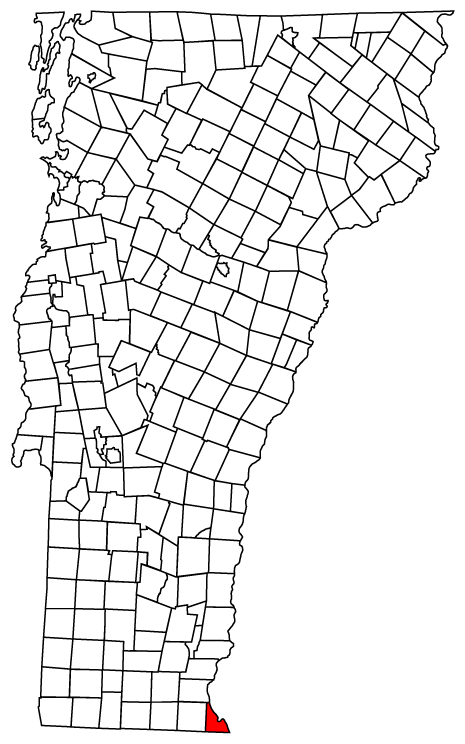
- Vernon, Vermont
- Coordinates: 42°44′54″N 72°29′50″W
- Country: United States
- State: Vermont
- County: Windham
- Communities: Vernon; North Vernon

Area
  - Total: 20.0 sq mi (51.8 km^{2})
  - Land: 19.4 sq mi (50.2 km^{2})
  - Water: 0.62 sq mi (1.6 km^{2})
- Elevation: 361 ft (110 m)

Population (2020)
  - Total: 2,192
  - Density: 113/sq mi (43.7/km^{2})
- Time zone: UTC-5 (Eastern (EST))
  - Summer (DST): UTC-4 (EDT)
- ZIP code: 05354
- Area code: 802
- FIPS code: 50-74800
- GNIS feature ID: 1462234
- Website: vernonvt.org

Vernon is a town in Windham County, Vermont, in the United States. The population was 2,192 at the 2020 census. Vernon is the site of the now-defunct Vermont Yankee, the state of Vermont's only nuclear power plant, which closed in December 2014.

== History ==
The town was chartered in 1672 as part of the Massachusetts Grant. In 1736 the area was granted by Massachusetts as part of Fall Town, and in 1753 the area was granted as Hinsdale. When the Connecticut River was established as a boundary, two separate towns were created: Hinsdale, New Hampshire and Hinsdale, Vermont. The people who lived in Hinsdale, Vermont wanted a separate name, and in 1802 the Vermont legislature changed the town's name to Vernon. The name is said to have been chosen after President George Washington's plantation home, Mount Vernon.

Fort Bridgman, in Vernon, was burned in 1755, a casualty of the French and Indian War.

== Geography ==
According to the United States Census Bureau, the town has a total area of 20.0 square miles (52 km^{2}), of which 19.4 square miles (50 km^{2}) is land and 0.6 square miles (1.6 km^{2}) (3.15%) is water. Vernon lies on the southern and eastern Vermont borders, north of Franklin County, Massachusetts, and west of Cheshire County, New Hampshire. The town is bordered by Brattleboro to the north, Guilford to the west, Hinsdale, New Hampshire, to the east, and the towns of Bernardston, Massachusetts, and Northfield, Massachusetts to the south. The town hall lies 4 miles (6.4 km) south of downtown Brattleboro, 14 miles (23 km) north-northeast of Greenfield, 16 miles (26 km) southwest of Keene, and 80 miles (130 km) west-northwest of Boston.

=== Climate ===
This climatic region is typified by large seasonal temperature differences, with warm to hot (and often humid) summers and cold (sometimes severely cold) winters. According to the Köppen Climate Classification system, Vernon has a humid continental climate, abbreviated "Dfb" on climate maps.

== Demographics ==
Historical population
| Census | Pop. | Note | %± |
|---|---|---|---|
| 1790 | 482 | | — |
| 1800 | 480 | | −0.4% |
| 1810 | 521 | | 8.5% |
| 1820 | 627 | | 20.3% |
| 1830 | 681 | | 8.6% |
| 1840 | 705 | | 3.5% |
| 1850 | 821 | | 16.5% |
| 1860 | 725 | | −11.7% |
| 1870 | 764 | | 5.4% |
| 1880 | 652 | | −14.7% |
| 1890 | 567 | | −13.0% |
| 1900 | 578 | | 1.9% |
| 1910 | 606 | | 4.8% |
| 1920 | 556 | | −8.3% |
| 1930 | 609 | | 9.5% |
| 1940 | 559 | | −8.2% |
| 1950 | 712 | | 27.4% |
| 1960 | 865 | | 21.5% |
| 1970 | 1,024 | | 18.4% |
| 1980 | 1,175 | | 14.7% |
| 1990 | 1,850 | | 57.4% |
| 2000 | 2,141 | | 15.7% |
| 2010 | 2,206 | | 3.0% |
| 2020 | 2,192 | | −0.6% |
U.S. Decennial Census

As of the census of 2000, there were 2,141 people, 741 households, and 574 families living in the town. The population density was 110.5 people per square mile (42.7 people/km^{2}). There were 784 housing units at an average density of 40.5 per square mile (15.6/km^{2}). The racial makeup of the town was 98.60% White, 0.28% African American, 0.19% Native American, 0.14% Asian, 0.05% Pacific Islander, and 0.75% from two or more races. Hispanic or Latino of any race were 0.84% of the population.

There were 741 households, out of which 37.5% had children under the age of 18 living with them, 66.7% were married couples living together, 7.3% had a female householder with no husband present, and 22.5% were non-families. 17.7% of all households were made up of individuals, and 6.6% had someone living alone who was 65 years of age or older. The average household size was 2.76 and the average family size was 3.12.

In the town, the population was spread out, with 27.2% under the age of 18, 5.5% from 18 to 24, 27.7% from 25 to 44, 26.2% from 45 to 64, and 13.5% who were 65 years of age or older. The median age was 39 years. For every 100 females, there were 100.8 males. For every 100 females age 18 and over, there were 92.6 males.

The median income for a household in the town was $49,688, and the median income for a family was $55,625. Males had a median income of $35,845 versus $25,139 for females. The per capita income for the town was $19,720. About 2.5% of families and 2.8% of the population were below the poverty line, including 3.3% of those under age 18 and 2.0% of those age 65 or over.

== Education ==
Vernon is served by the Windham Southeast Supervisory Union. Vernon Elementary School is a public school located in Vernon and serves kindergarten to sixth grade. There is one public middle school, the Brattleboro Area Middle School (BAMS), and one public high school, the Brattleboro Union High School (BUHS). There is also a career development center, the Windham Regional Career Center.

== Notable people ==
- Karen Carroll, Justice of the Vermont Supreme Court
- George Howe, State's Attorney of Windham County, member of the Vermont Senate
- Jonathan Hunt, US congressman

== Vermont Yankee nuclear power plant ==
The town is the site of the now-closed Vermont Yankee nuclear power plant, which shut down on December 29, 2014.
