= Clarissa Danforth =

First woman ordained as a Free Will Baptist minister

Clarissa Danforth (1792–1855) was the first woman ordained as a Free Will Baptist minister.

Danforth was born in Weathersfield, Vermont, in 1792. She heard Rev. John Colby preach in 1809 on his way to Ohio and had a conversion experience. After her ordination in 1815, Danforth became an itinerant preacher throughout northern New England. She began preaching in Chepachet, Rhode Island, and the surrounding areas in 1818 after taking over as pastor of the Chepachet Baptist Church when John Colby died. Danforth spent most of her career in Rhode Island and helped lead the revival in Smithfield emanating from the Greenville Baptist Church. She also preached for periods in Massachusetts, New Hampshire and Vermont. In 1822 she married Danford Richmond a Baptist minister from Pomfret, Connecticut, and they moved to New York where she preached only occasionally. Danforth died around 1855.

== See also ==
- Ordination of women
