= John Colby =

John Colby may refer to:

- John Colby (preacher)
- John Colby (musician)
