= New Hampton =

New Hampton is the name of several towns in the United States:

- New Hampton, Iowa, county seat of Chickasaw County
- New Hampton Township, Chickasaw County, Iowa
- New Hampton, Missouri
- New Hampton, New Hampshire, a New England town
  - New Hampton (CDP), New Hampshire, the main village in the town
- New Hampton, New Jersey
- New Hampton, New York
