= Dana Meeting House =

Historic church in New Hampshire, United States

- U.S. National Register of Historic Places
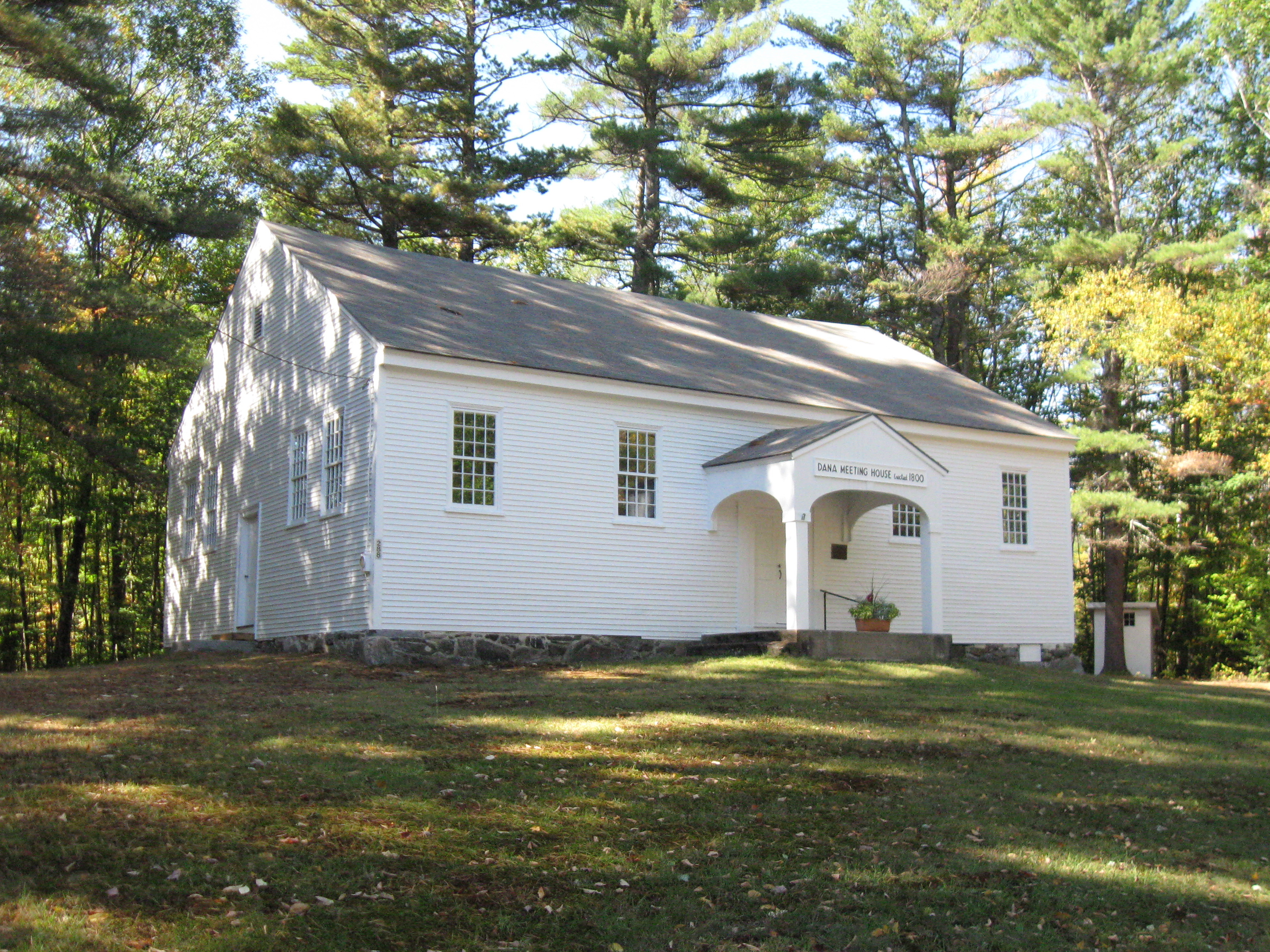

- Location within New Hampshire Location within the United States
- Location: Dana Hill Rd., New Hampton, New Hampshire
- Coordinates: 43°38′34″N 71°38′0″W
- Area: 0.4 acres (0.16 ha)
- Built: 1800
- NRHP reference No.: 84000516
- Added to NRHP: December 13, 1984

Dana Meeting House (also known as First Free Will Baptist Meeting House and Dr. Dana Meetinghouse) is a historic meeting house on Dana Hill Road in New Hampton, New Hampshire.

The meeting house was built in 1800 by a Free Will Baptist congregation after the majority of the townspeople voted that the town's tax-subsidized New Hampton Town House should be used by the Congregationalists. The Baptist congregation originally met in homes until its meeting house was completed, and the early congregation was opposed to a paid ministry. Originally, services were conducted in rotation by three men: Simeon Dana, a physician, Josiah Magoon, a Revolutionary War veteran, and Thomas Perkins, a legislator. The best known was Dr. Dana who regularly conducted Sunday worship services from 1803 to 1853 and became the namesake of the church. Notable early preachers included Benjamin Randall and John Colby.

Church services were held on Sundays throughout the year until 1860, when regular Free Will Baptist services were discontinued. Various summer services were held in the meeting house after the 1860s. Rev. Adoniram Judson Gordon, a prominent minister who was a native of New Hampton, often preached at the meeting house during the summers. Gordon went on to found Gordon College. The meeting house was added to the National Register of Historic Places in 1984 and contains box pews and a few unboxed pews.

The Dana Church was founded Jan. 6, 1800 at the home of Capt. Peter Hanaford. Josiah Magoon was chosen as one of three messengers to the Quarterly Meeting at Canterbury. In April 1802, Brother Magoon (Josiah, Sr.) was one of three men appointed to “take oversight in building the meetinghouse.” The building was first used in Dec. 1802, during the ordination of the first elders and deacons, including the Elder Josiah and Deacon James Huckins.

Josiah's son, Stephen, was the cabinetmaker who made the pews and finished the interior of the church. Elder Magoon was an itinerant preacher in Maine, Vermont, and mostly in New Hampshire. Among his descendants were several noted ministers, educators, architect, politicians, and lawyers. He did not preach much after his 80th birthday. Stephen Sleeper Magoon's house is across the street from the Dana Meeting house. Stephen was a farmer, country merchant, and held various offices in New Hampton.

On March 9, 1801, the first town meeting was held in this meeting house. The names of many of the founding families are still on plaques on each of the pews in the meeting house, of where they were to sit.

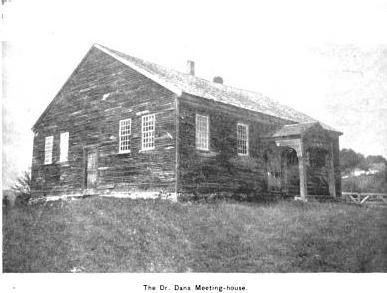
Dana Meeting House

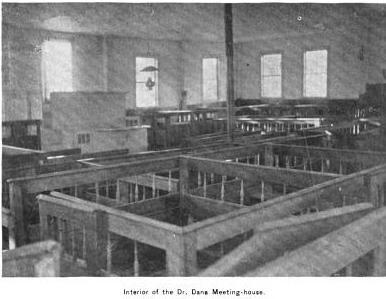
Dana Meeting House

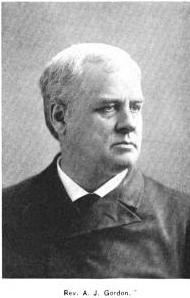
Rev. Adoniram Judson Gordon
