= Samuel J. Williams =

American farmer, livestock trader, military officer (1830–1864)

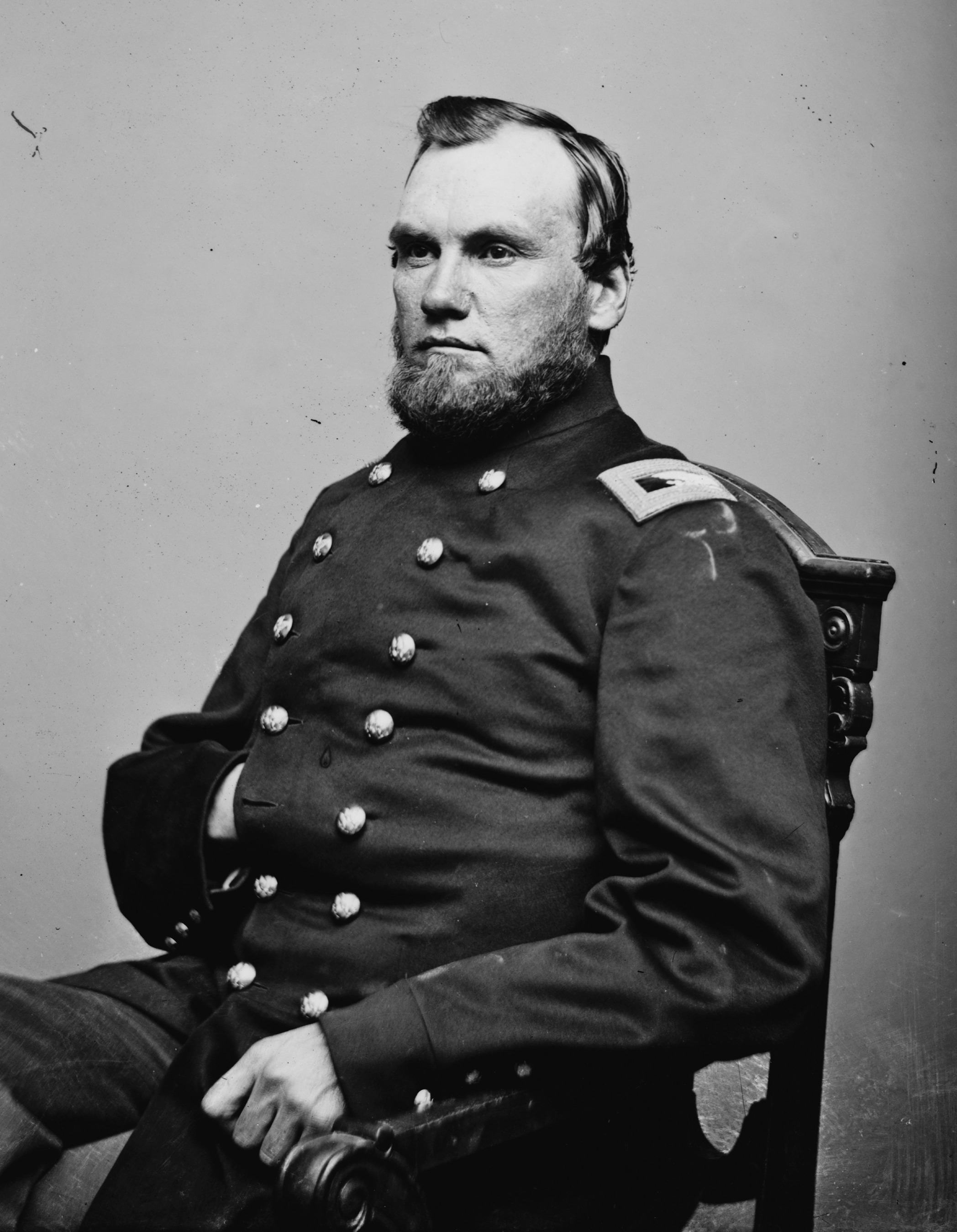
- Williams, c. 1863–1864
- Born: October 13, 1830; Montgomery County, Virginia, U.S.
- Died: May 6, 1864 (aged 33); The Wilderness, Orange County, Virginia, C.S.
- Burial place: White Cemetery, Selma, Indiana, U.S.
- Spouses: Lurena Davis (m. 1850, died) Rebecca Shroyer (m. 1852)
- Children: 6
- Military career
- Allegiance: United States
- Branch: United States Army
- Service years: 1861–1864
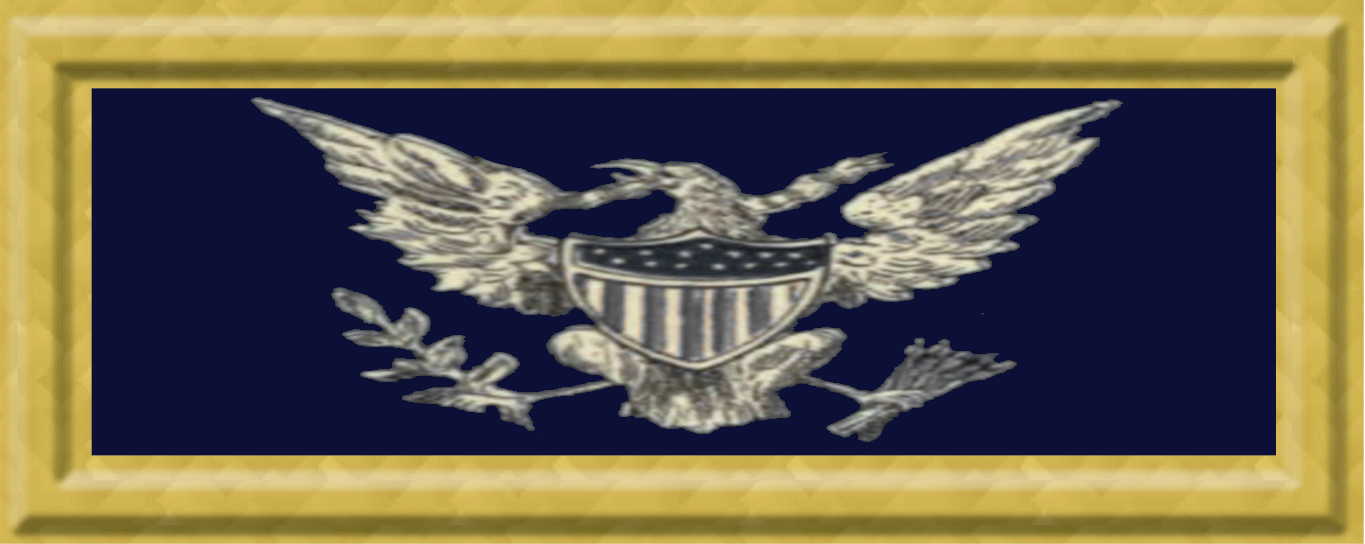
- Rank: Colonel
- Units: Company K, 19th Indiana Infantry Regiment
- Commands: 19th Indiana Infantry Regiment
- Conflicts: American Civil War; Eastern theater; Northern Virginia campaign; Second Battle of Bull Run; Maryland campaign; Battle of South Mountain; Battle of Antietam; Gettysburg campaign; Battle of Gettysburg; Overland Campaign; Battle of the Wilderness †

Samuel J. Williams (October 13, 1830 – May 6, 1864) sometimes written as S.J. Williams, was an American farmer, livestock trader, military officer, and Freemason from Virginia who settled Selma, Indiana. During the American Civil War, Williams commanded the 19th Indiana Infantry Regiment of the Iron Brigade following the wounding of the regiment's original commander, Solomon Meredith, during the Battle of Gettysburg. Williams would command the 19th Indiana Infantry Regiment from October 1862 until May 1864 when he was killed at the Battle of the Wilderness.

== Early life ==
Samuel J. Williams was born on October 13, 1830, in Montgomery County, Virginia, to parents William Henry Williams and Celia Young. In 1833 Williams' family moved to Selma in Delaware County, Indiana, where he worked as a farmer and traded livestock.

== Military career ==
At the outbreak of the American Civil War Williams volunteered for service in the Union army on July 29, 1861, and was enrolled into the ranks of Company K, nicknamed the "Selma Legion", of the 19th Indiana Infantry Regiment and was elected as the company's Captain.

Williams served with the 19th Indiana during some of the regiments bloodiest engagements in the Eastern theater of the American Civil War including the Second Battle of Bull Run, the Battle of South Mountain, and the Battle of Antietam. Following the Second Battle of Bull Run, Williams was promoted to the rank of Lieutenant Colonel on September 18, 1862. During the Battle of Gettysburg Williams temporarily commanded the regiment after the regiment's Colonel, Solomon Meredith, was wounded in the chest. Williams himself was also wounded at Gettysburg but survived the battle.

Following the Gettysburg campaign, Meredith was promoted to the rank of Brigadier General, Williams therefore was promoted to the rank of Colonel and given command of the 19th Indiana Infantry Regiment. Williams would command the regiment during the Battle of the Wilderness where Williams was ultimately killed in action by a cannonball through his chest on May 6, 1864.

== Personal life and death ==
Williams married Lurena Davis on January 29, 1850, with whom he had one child. After the death of his first wife, Williams married Rebecca Shroyer of Virginia on August 5, 1852. Together they had five children, three sons and two daughters. Williams was a member of both the Freemasons and the Independent Order of Odd Fellows. Although originally an ardent Democrat by 1856 became a staunch supporter of the Republican Party and voted for John C. Frémont.

Williams died on May 6, 1864, and his body was transported back to Selma it was interred in the Sparr Cemetery in Liberty Township, Delaware County, Indiana, before being reinterred at the White Cemetery in Selma.

== Legacy ==
Two major Grand Army of the Republic posts were named in honor of Williams according to the Sons of Union Veterans of the Civil War, those posts being "Williams post. No. 78" in Muncie, Indiana and "Col. S. J. Williams post. No. 267" in Selma, Indiana.
