= Weathersfield, Vermont =

- Town
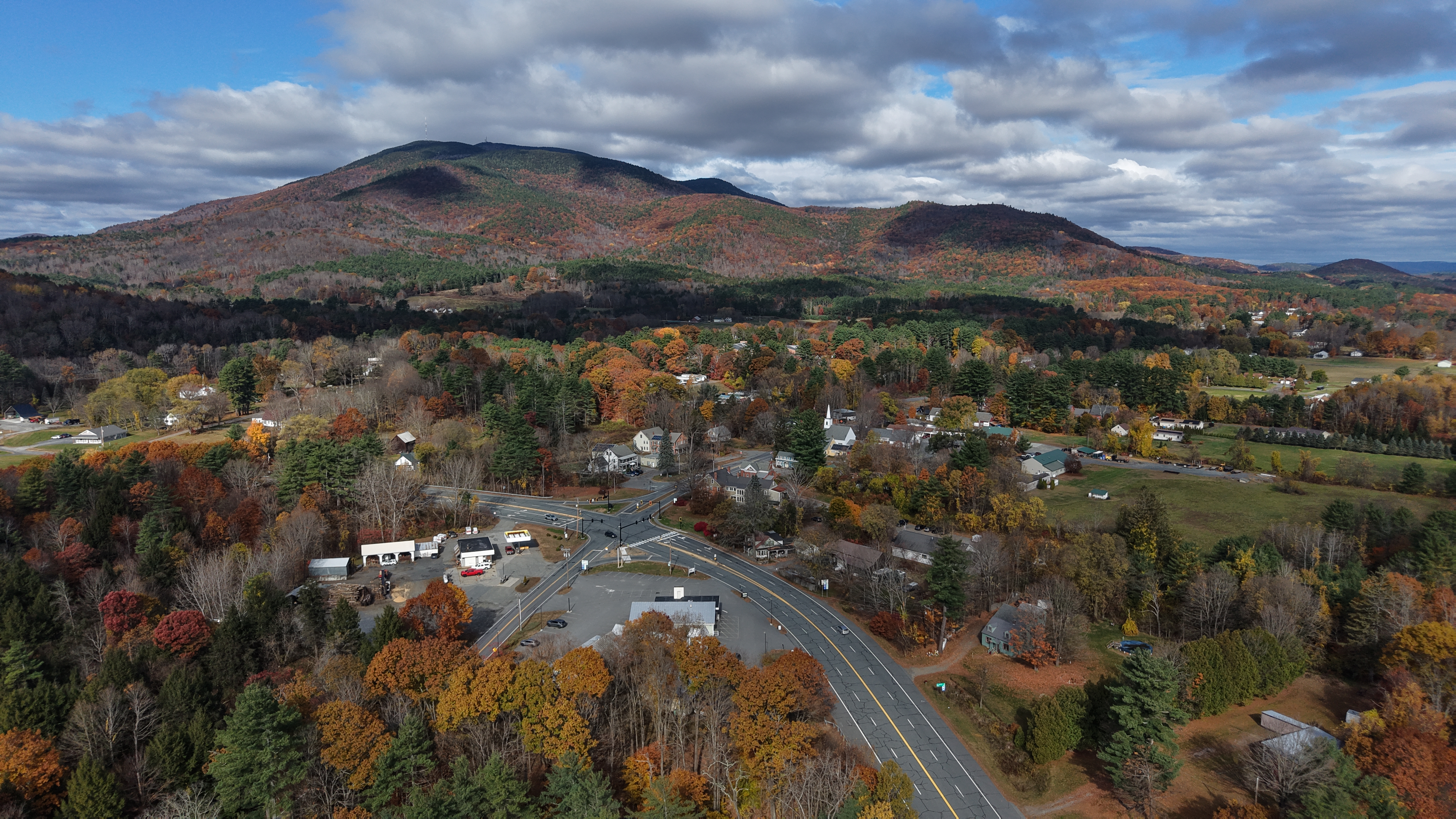
- Ascutney, VT, from the southeast

- Seal

- Location in Windsor County and the state of Vermont.
- Coordinates: 43°23′20″N 72°29′45″W
- Country: United States
- State: Vermont
- County: Windsor
- Communities: Amsden; Ascutney; Greenbush; Kendricks Corner; Nelsons Corner; Perkinsville; Weathersfield Bow; Weathersfield Center

Area
  - Total: 44.2 sq mi (114.5 km^{2})
  - Land: 43.6 sq mi (113.0 km^{2})
  - Water: 0.58 sq mi (1.5 km^{2})
- Elevation: 1,001 ft (305 m)

Population (2020)
  - Total: 2,842
  - Density: 65.14/sq mi (25.15/km^{2})
- Time zone: UTC-5 (Eastern (EST))
  - Summer (DST): UTC-4 (EDT)
- ZIP Codes: 05030 (Ascutney); 05151 (Perkinsville); 05156 (Springfield); 05062 (Reading); 05142 (Cavendish)
- Area code: 802
- FIPS code: 50-77500
- GNIS feature ID: 1462247
- Website: www.weathersfieldvt.org

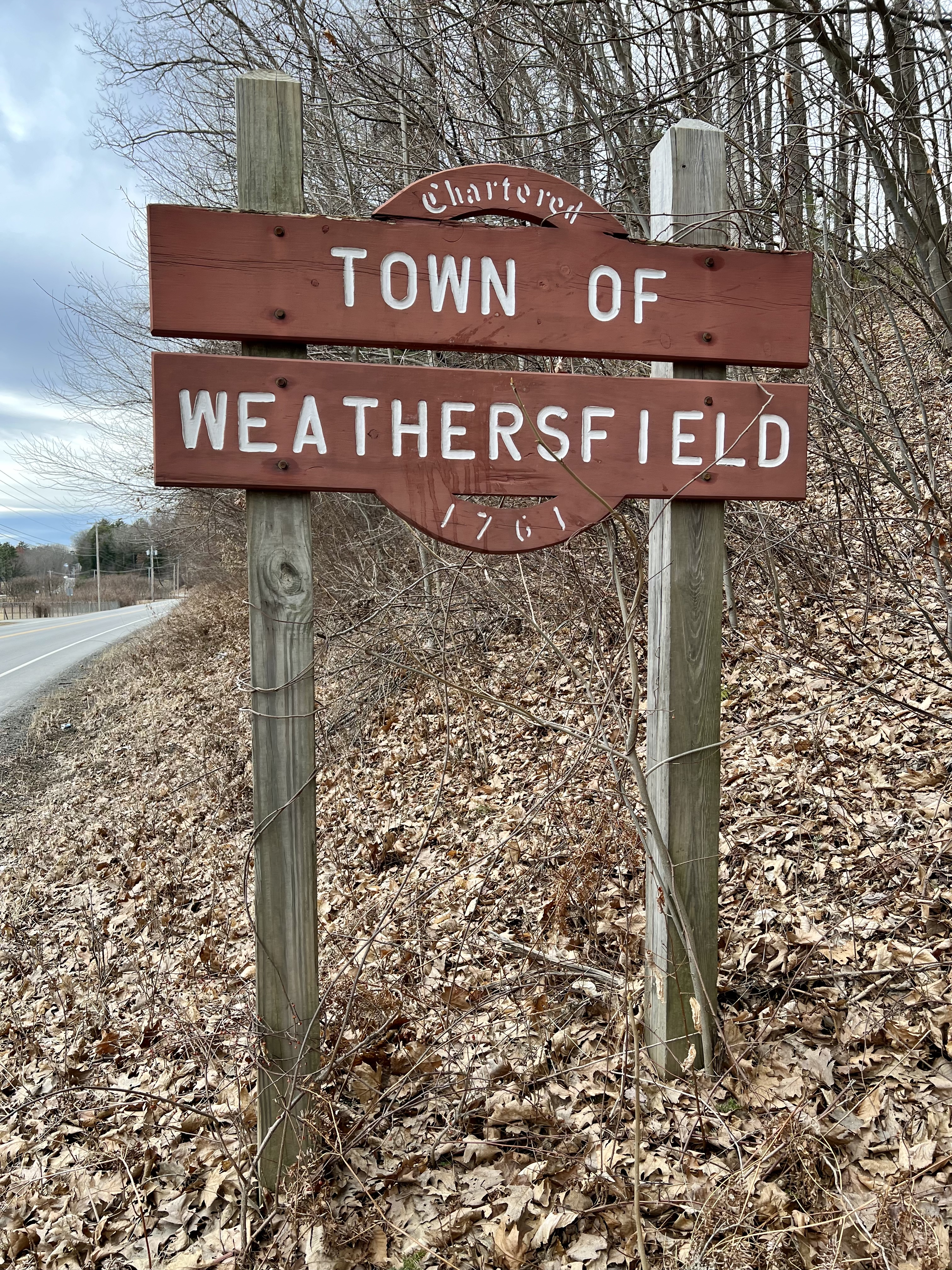
Town sign on U.S. Route 5

Weathersfield is a town in Windsor County, Vermont, United States. The population was 2,842 at the 2020 census.

== History ==
The town of Weathersfield was named after Wethersfield, Connecticut, the home of some of its earliest settlers. The Connecticut town had taken its name from Wethersfield, a village in the English county of Essex.

William Jarvis was appointed by President Thomas Jefferson as U.S. Consul General to Portugal after founding a trading house in Lisbon. In 1811, Jarvis imported the first Merino sheep to America from Spain to his farm at Weathersfield Bow. Jarvis set aside eight of the 4,000 Merino sheep he imported as gifts to former President Jefferson and to President James Madison.

"I cannot forbear, Sir," Jarvis wrote to Jefferson, "making you an offer of a Ram & Ewes, both as a mark of my great esteem & well knowing that the experiment cannot be in better hands." Jarvis was a wealthy financier and gentleman farmer who had bought up most of the floodplain of Weathersfield. He was also one of the most prominent Democratic-Republicans in the Connecticut River Valley. Thanks to his introduction of Merino sheep, he provided the underpinning for Vermont agriculture for the next century.

Jarvis married his maternal first cousin, Mary Pepperell Sparhawk of Boston, a fellow descendant of Sir William Pepperrell of Massachusetts. Katherine L. Jarvis, daughter of Hon. William Jarvis, married Harvard-educated lawyer and photographer Col. Leavitt Hunt, brother of architect Richard Morris Hunt and Boston painter William Morris Hunt, and son of Vermont congressman Jonathan Hunt. Leavitt Hunt and his wife later lived in Weathersfield at their home, Elmsholme.

Rev. John Dudley, a sometime missionary to the Choctaw Indians, a graduate of Yale Seminary, the descendant of one of the earliest families of Connecticut (his ancestor William Dudley settled in Guilford in the early 17th century) and a widely reprinted Congregational preacher, made his home in Weathersfield, where his son William Wade Dudley was born.

On August 20, 2011, Weathersfield celebrated the 250th anniversary of its town charter.

=== Romaine Tenney ===
In September 1964, a Weathersfield bachelor farmer named Romaine Tenney burned himself and his farm rather than allow construction of Interstate 91 which was then proceeding through the Connecticut Valley. The state transportation agency had offered landowners compensation, but could also seize land by eminent domain. Many landowners resisted, including one who shot a hole through a surveyor’s hard hat. Tenney happened to be the last local holdout. Finally, he was given an ultimatum to leave. That night a fire ravaged the barn, sheds, and farmhouse. Although Tenney’s body was not identified, it was evident he had nailed his bedroom door shut from the inside. The day after his memorial service, construction on the highway resumed.

Tenney was memorialized as the subject of poems, ghost stories, and songs. Tenney’s legacy has become a source of pride for some, despite its horror. It is a display of New England "flint", a story preserved by the Weathersfield Historical Society.

The farm eventually became a park and ride at Exit 8 (Vermont Route 131), where commuters could park their cars and board buses. In March 2020, the last vestige of the farm, a dying rock maple tree was removed. The Vermont Agency of Transportation acknowledged the site’s significance as the Romaine Tenney Memorial Park with a lawn, pavilion, memorial plaque, and picnic table.

== Geography ==
According to the United States Census Bureau, the town has a total area of 44.2 square miles (114.5 km^{2}), of which 43.6 square miles (113.0 km^{2}) is land and 0.58 square miles (1.5 km^{2}), or 1.27%, is water. The town of Weathersfield includes the village of Perkinsville.

== Demographics ==
Historical population
Census	Pop.	Note	%±
1790	1,146		—
1800	1,944		69.6%
1810	2,115		8.8%
1820	2,301		8.8%
1830	2,213		−3.8%
1840	2,002		−9.5%
1850	1,851		−7.5%
1860	1,765		−4.6%
1870	1,557		−11.8%
1880	1,354		−13.0%
1890	1,174		−13.3%
1900	1,089		−7.2%
1910	1,092		0.3%
1920	1,087		−0.5%
1930	1,156		6.3%
1940	1,075		−7.0%
1950	1,288		19.8%
1960	1,254		−2.6%
1970	2,040		62.7%
1980	2,534		24.2%
1990	2,674		5.5%
2000	2,788		4.3%
2010	2,825		1.3%
2020	2,842		0.6%
U.S. Decennial Census

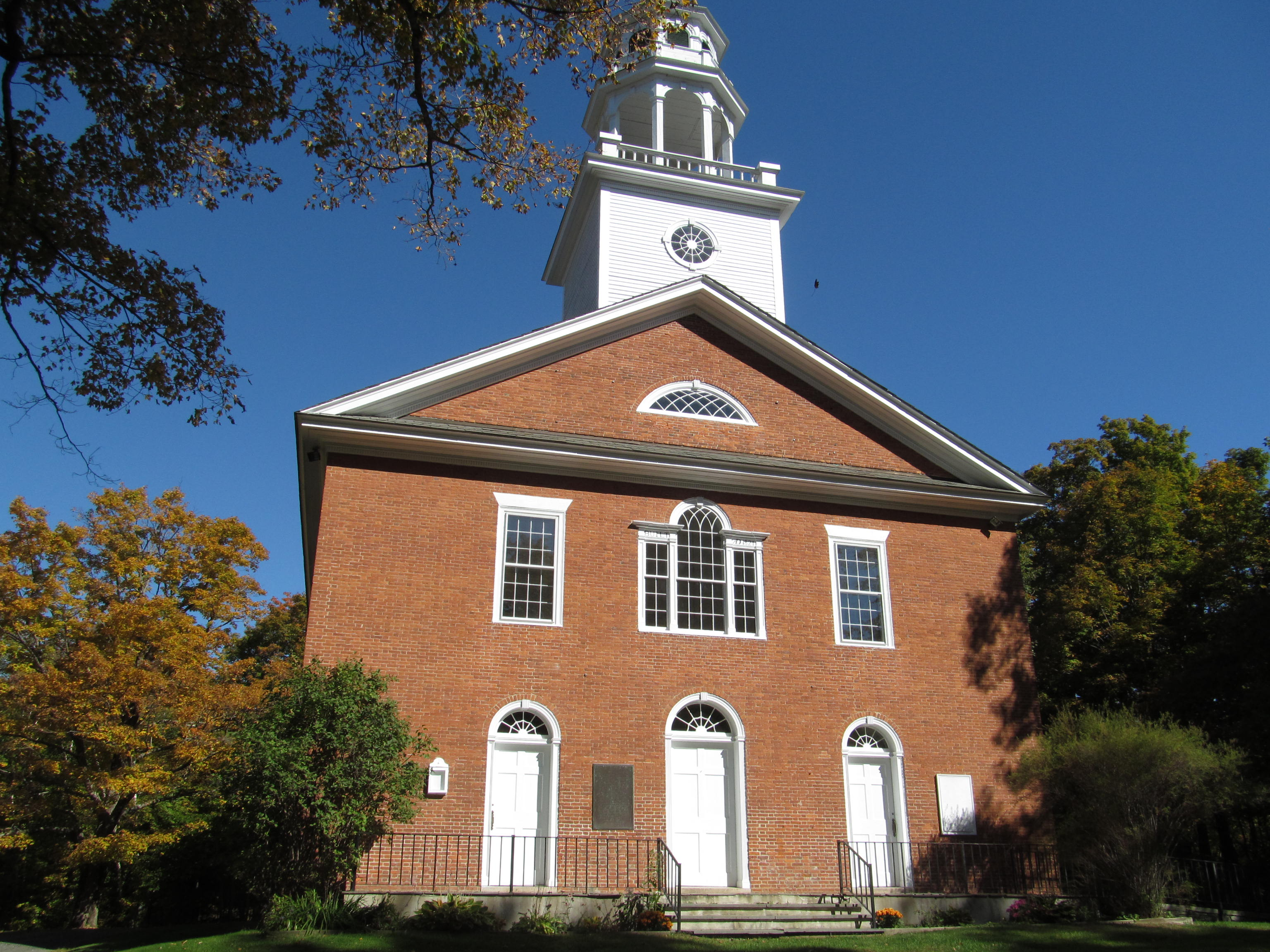
The church in Weathersfield Center

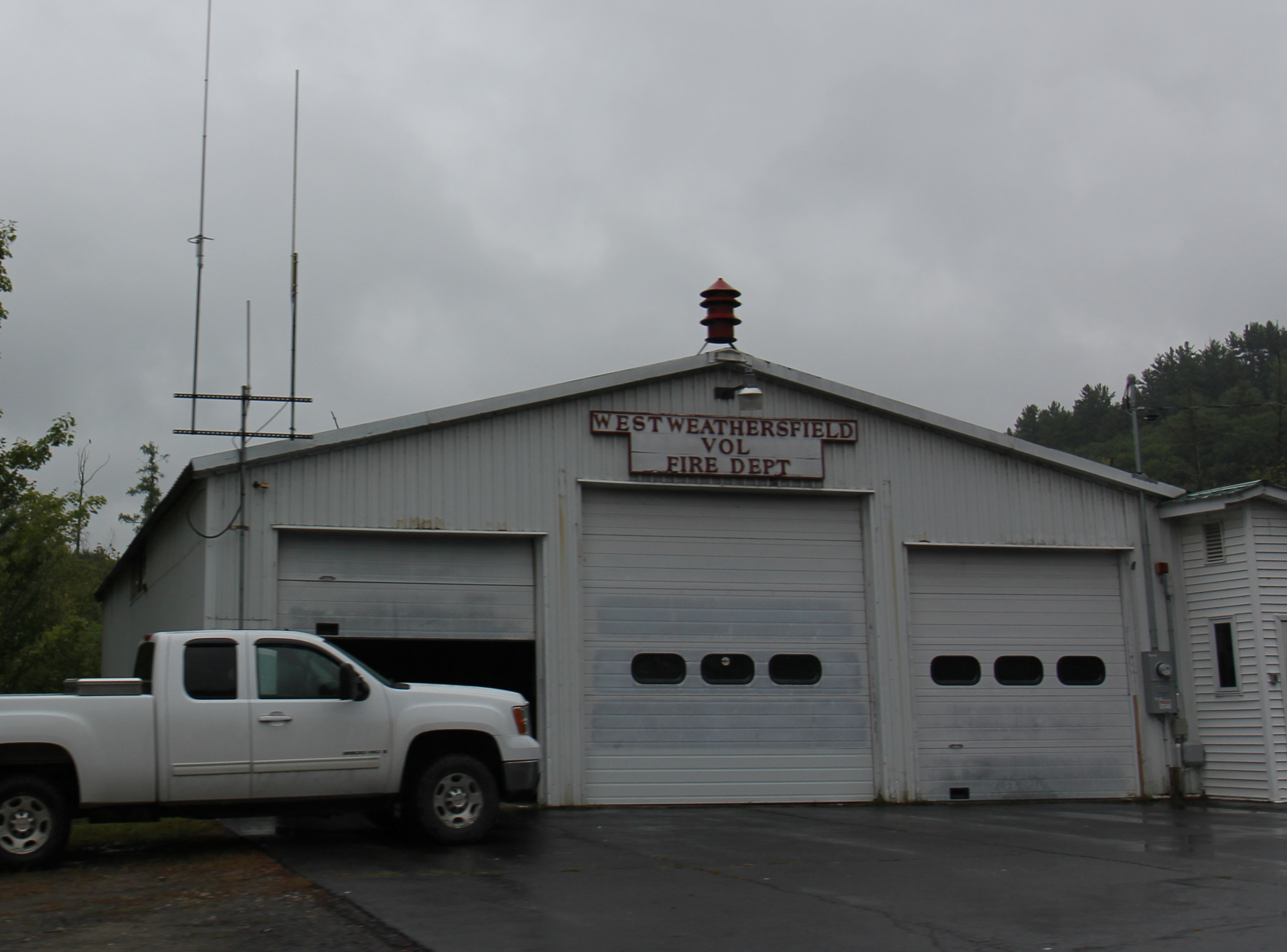
West Weathersfield Volunteer Fire Department

As of the census of 2000, there were 2,788 people, 1,167 households, and 830 families residing in the town. The population density was 63.7 people per square mile (24.6/km^{2}). There were 1,315 housing units at an average density of 30.0 per square mile (11.6/km^{2}). The racial makeup of the town was 98.57% White, 0.07% African American, 0.29% Native American, 0.25% Asian, and 0.82% from two or more races. Hispanic or Latino of any race were 0.72% of the population.

There were 1,167 households, out of which 26.2% had children under the age of 18 living with them, 61.6% were married couples living together, 5.9% had a female householder with no husband present, and 28.8% were non-families. 22.1% of all households were made up of individuals, and 11.0% had someone living alone who was 65 years of age or older. The average household size was 2.39 and the average family size was 2.77.

In the town, the population was spread out, with 20.6% under the age of 18, 5.1% from 18 to 24, 26.9% from 25 to 44, 31.2% from 45 to 64, and 16.3% who were 65 years of age or older. The median age was 44 years. For every 100 females, there were 96.5 males. For every 100 females aged 18 and over, there were 95.0 males.

The median income for a household in the town was $42,057, and the median income for a family was $46,282. Males had a median income of $33,226 versus $27,011 for females. The per capita income for the town was $21,647. About 4.8% of families and 6.5% of the population were below the poverty line, including 9.2% of those under age 18 and 5.4% of those aged 65 or over.

== Arts and culture ==
=== Tourism ===
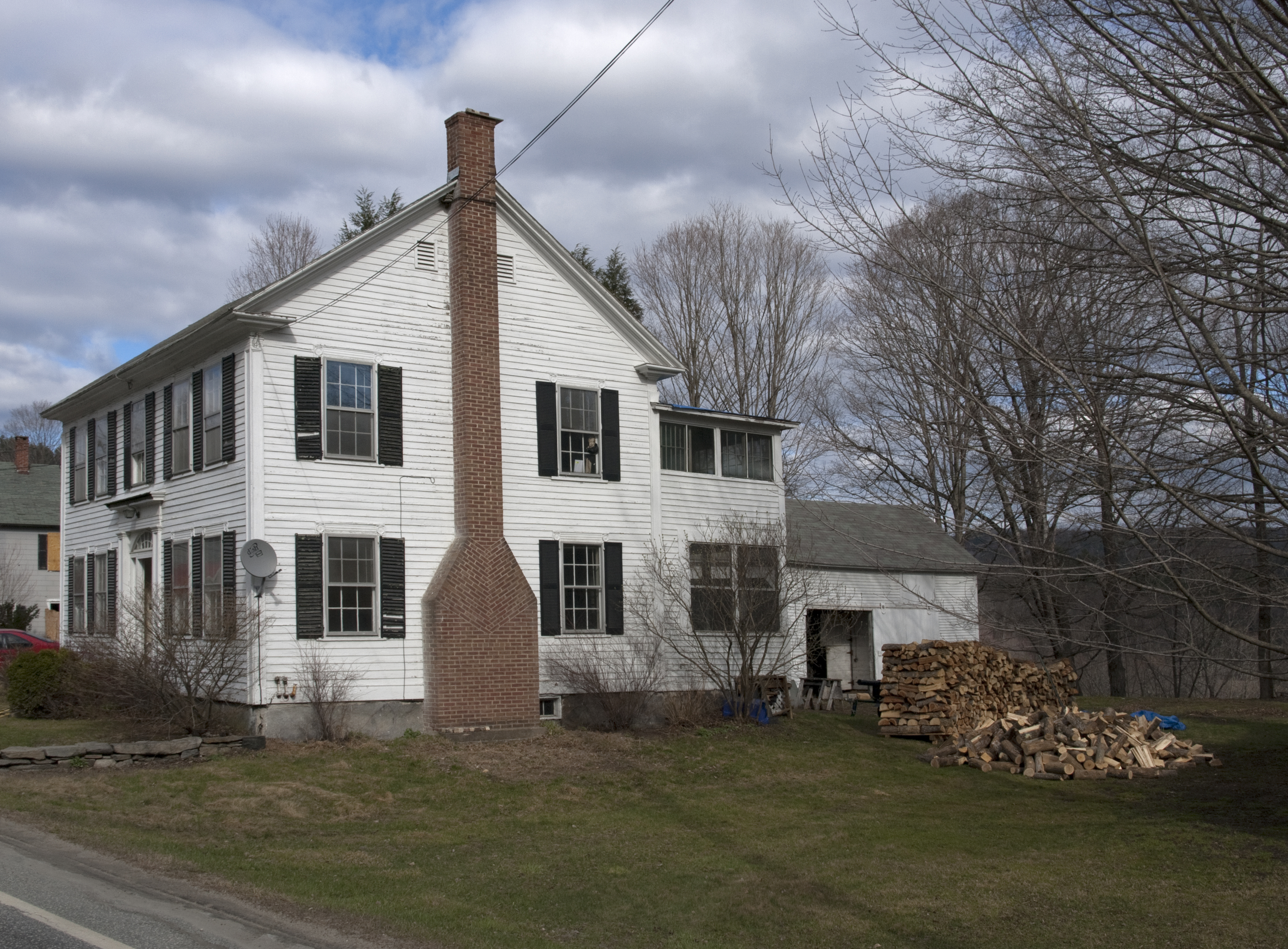
A house in Perkinsville

Several historical buildings are located in the Weathersfield Center Historic District, including the Reverend Dan Foster House, the Weathersfield Meeting House and the First Congregational Church. The Reverend Dan Foster House is now a museum operated by the Weathersfield Historical Society. The house was built during the Revolutionary War with some sections completed in 1825. The museum houses Civil War memorabilia, a children's school room and a library.

== Education ==
=== Primary and Secondary schools ===
The Weathersfield School District serves Weathersfield. There is one school in the district, Weathersfield School, located in Ascutney.

=== Public libraries ===
The Weathersfield Proctor Library serves the Weathersfield area. The library is on Route 5, north of the intersection with Route 131.

== Media ==
A detailed history of the town is available for the years 1971 through 1986 in the form of a weekly newspaper, The Weathersfield Weekly, which covered the history and current events in the town. The newspaper was closed by its editors and publishers, Armstrong and Edith Hunter, in 1986, though they published a five-year retrospective in 1991.

== Notable people ==
- Charles E. Billings, engineer, inventor and businessman
- Aretas Blood, steam locomotive manufacturer
- Clarissa Danforth, early female Christian minister
- William Wade Dudley, politician
- Barbara Galpin, journalist
- Jarvis Hunt, architect
- William Jarvis, consul to Portugal under president Thomas Jefferson
- Franklin S. Lawrence, member of the Wisconsin State Assembly
- Don A. J. Upham, mayor of Milwaukee, Wisconsin
