= Clarendon Street Baptist Church =

Coordinates: 42°20′39″N 71°4′20″W

The Clarendon Street Baptist Church was built in 1868–1869 in Boston, Massachusetts, and closed in 1982 after its building had been gutted by fire. The congregation was founded in 1827 and had previously been known as the Federal Street Baptist Church and the Rowe Street Baptist Church.

== History ==
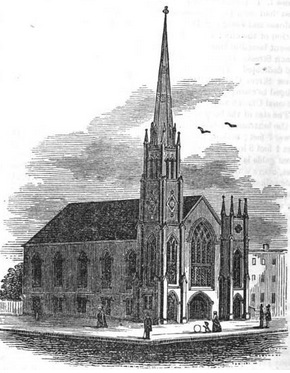
Rowe Street Baptist Church

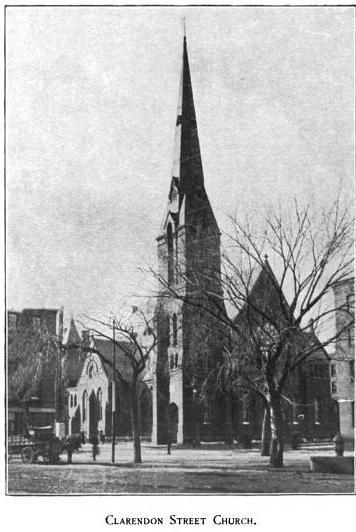
Clarendon Street Baptist Church

=== Federal Street ===
The congregation was founded in Federal Street, Boston. on a site near Milk Street, in 1827 The first pastor was Howard Malcom, who later was president of Georgetown College in Kentucky, the University at Lewisburg in Pennsylvania, and Hahnemann Medical College in Philadelphia. By 1844 the area around Federal Street was becoming a commercial district and losing its population, so the church decided to move.

=== Rowe Street ===
The new site was on the corner of Chauncy Street and Bedford Street. On April 27. 1846, the cornerstone for the church was laid. It was built of dark-red sandstone in the Gothic style, with a corner tower and a 175-foot spire. The interior of the building was finished in black walnut. On April 7, 1847, the building was dedicated. The church adopted the name the "Rowe Street Baptist Society". Rowe Street was absorbed into Chauncy Street in 1856.

The intended pastor for the new church was Mr. Hague, but his ill health had prevented him from leading the church. On November 1, 1848, Rev. Baron Stow, previously with the Baldwin Place Church in the North End, was called as the church pastor. In 1853, there were 275 members and more than 400 Sunday school students.

According to a letter published by the abolitionist newspaper The Liberator in 1860, the purchase of pews at the church was limited to "respectable white people".

As the area around the church was again becoming more commercial, the second church building was sold in 1868. The Rowe Street building was demolished and the materials were used to build a chapel for the Episcopal Church of the Messiah, Auburndale in 1880.

=== Clarendon Street ===
The church moved to the corner of Clarendon Street and Montgomery Street in 1869. The new building was designed by Samuel J. F. Thayer. Adoniram Judson Gordon was appointed pastor in the same year. Gordon founded the Boston Missionary Training School, now Gordon College in 1889. The Clarendon Street Baptist Church closed in 1982 after its building had been gutted by fire. Its building was redeveloped as apartments in 1987.
