= Reverend Dan Foster House =

- U.S. Historic district – Contributing property
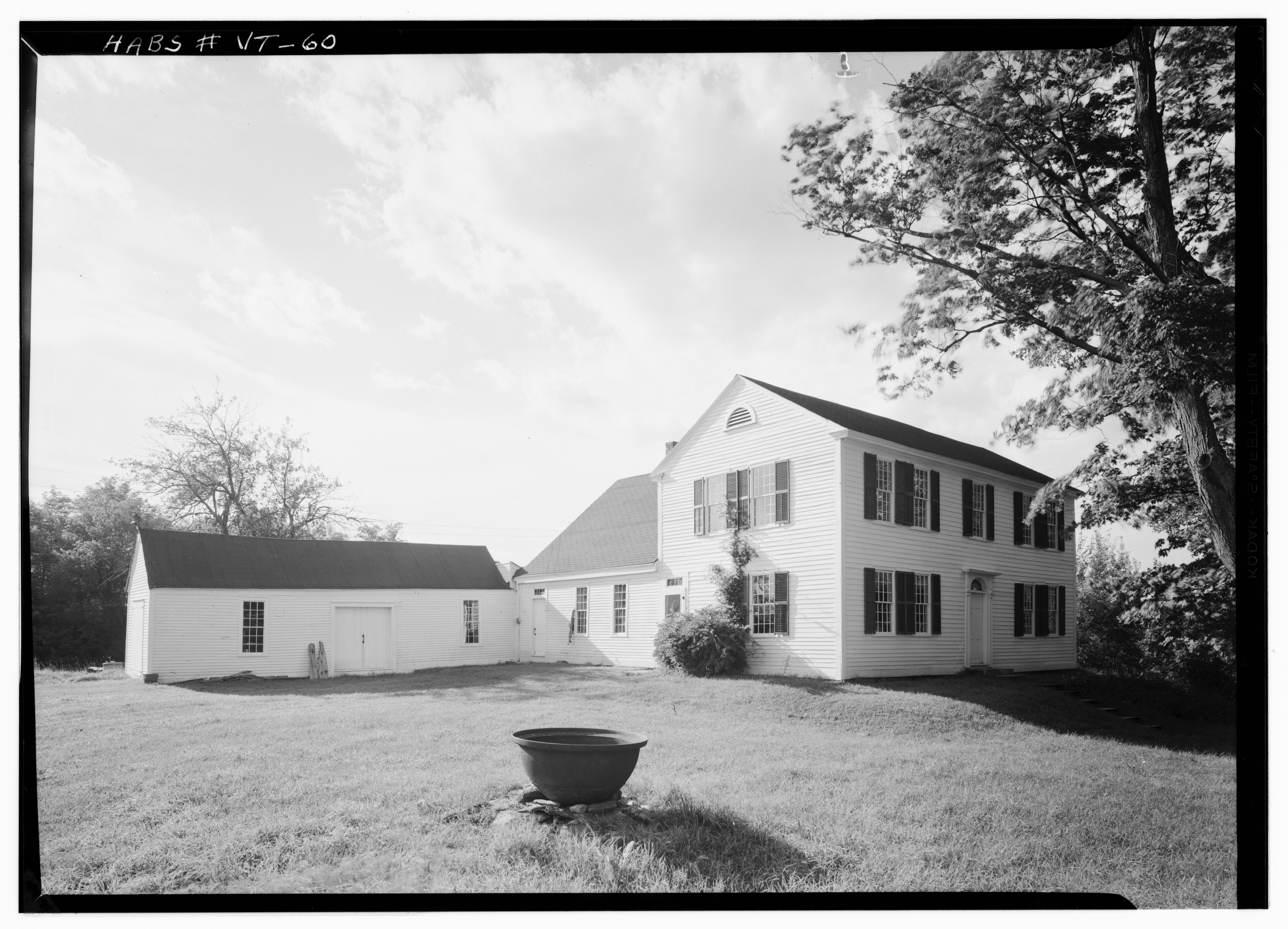
- Reverend Dan Foster House, 1930s

- Location within Vermont Location within the United States
- Location: Weathersfield, Vermont
- Coordinates: 43.378852°N 72.4672884°W
- Built: 1785
- Part of: Weathersfield Center Historic District (ID80000345)
- Designated CP: June 30, 1980

The Reverend Dan Foster House is a historic house in Weathersfield, Vermont built in 1785 and expanded in 1825. It is part of the National Register of Historic Places designated Weathersfield Center Historic District.

== Bibliography ==
Christina Tree and Rachel Carter Explorer's Guide Vermont, Thirteenth Edition (Countryman Press, 2012) page 220
