= Perkinsville, Vermont =

- Village
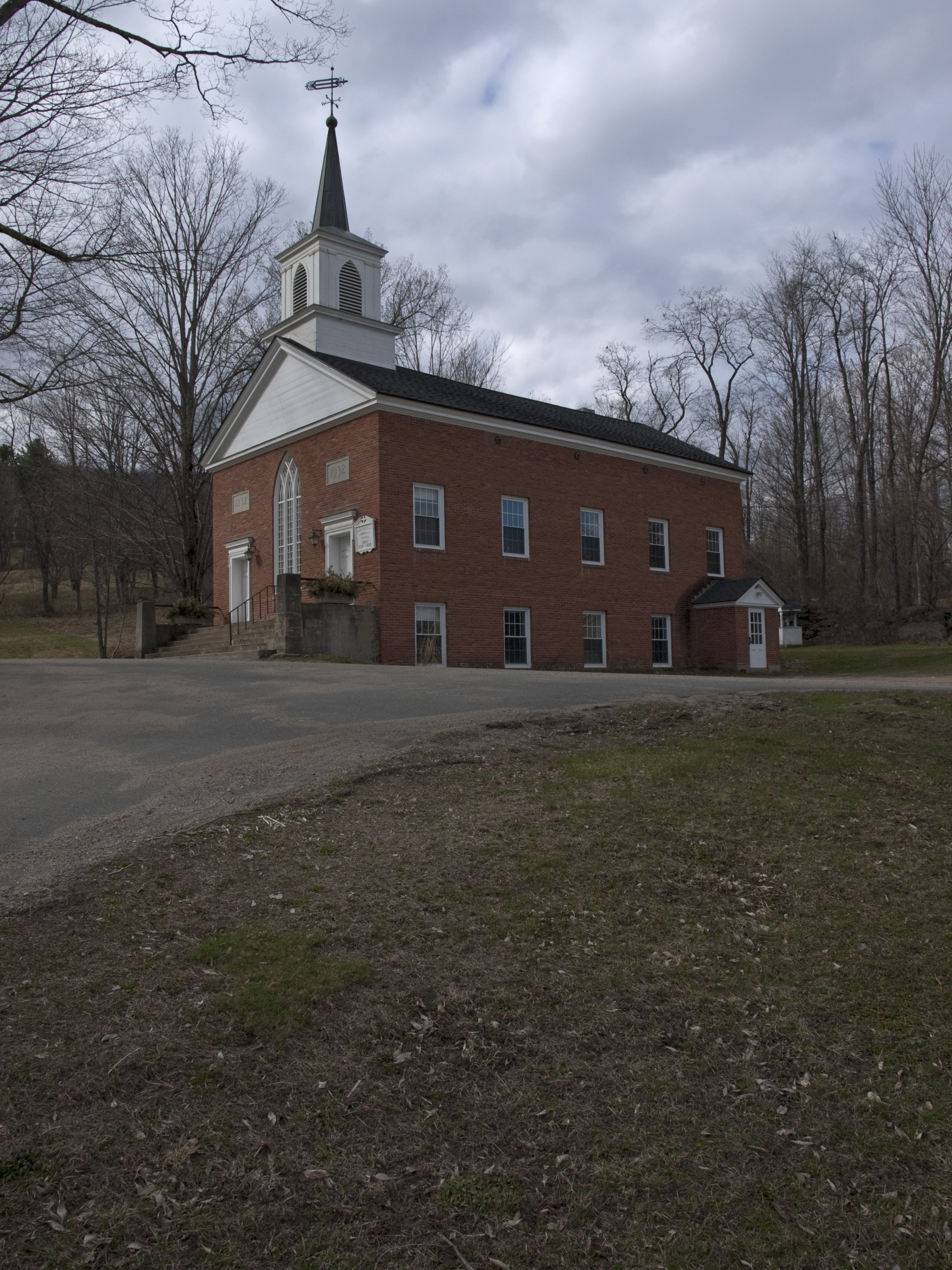
- Perkinsville Community Church

- Location in Windsor County and the state of Vermont.
- Coordinates: 43°22′23″N 72°30′50″W
- Country: United States
- State: Vermont
- County: Windsor
- Town: Weathersfield

Area
  - Total: 0.19 sq mi (0.49 km^{2})
  - Land: 0.18 sq mi (0.47 km^{2})
  - Water: 0.0077 sq mi (0.02 km^{2})
- Elevation: 584 ft (178 m)

Population (2020)
  - Total: 108
  - Density: 600/sq mi (230/km^{2})
- Time zone: UTC−5 (Eastern (EST))
  - Summer (DST): UTC−4 (EDT)
- ZIP Code: 05151
- Area code: 802
- FIPS code: 50-54850
- GNIS feature ID: 2378325

Perkinsville was a village located in the town of Weathersfield, Windsor County, Vermont, United States. The population was 108 at the 2020 census.

The village government was dissolved in 2020; the town of Weathersfield is now responsible for general governance, including village streetlights.

== Geography ==
According to the United States Census Bureau, the village has a total area of 0.2 square miles (0.52 km^{2}), all land.

== Demographics ==
Historical population
Census	Pop.	Note	%±
1930	155		—
1940	144		−7.1%
1950	142		−1.4%
1960	167		17.6%
1970	188		12.6%
1980	187		−0.5%
1990	148		−20.9%
2000	142		−4.1%
2010	130		−8.5%
2020	108		−16.9%
U.S. Decennial Census

As of the census of 2000, there were 142 people, 56 households, and 40 families residing in the village. The population density was 754.1 people per square mile (288.6/km^{2}). There were 59 housing units at an average density of 313.3/sq mi (119.9/km^{2}). The racial makeup of the village was 99.30% White and 0.70% African American.

There were 56 households, out of which 37.5% had children under the age of 18 living with them, 55.4% were married couples living together, 12.5% had a female householder with no husband present, and 26.8% were non-families. Of all households 21.4% were made up of individuals, and 14.3% had someone living alone who was 65 years of age or older. The average household size was 2.54 and the average family size was 2.88.

In the village, the population was spread out, with 26.8% under the age of 18, 4.9% from 18 to 24, 24.6% from 25 to 44, 27.5% from 45 to 64, and 16.2% who were 65 years of age or older. The median age was 40 years. For every 100 females, there were 94.5 males. For every 100 females age 18 and over, there were 82.5 males.

The median income for a household in the village was $22,708, and the median income for a family was $24,583. Males had a median income of $30,750 versus $23,182 for females. The per capita income for the village was $18,321. There were 18.6% of families and 19.9% of the population living below the poverty line, including 38.7% of under eighteens and 10.0% of those over 64.
