= Virginia Claypool Meredith =

American farmer, livestock breeder, writer, lecturer and clubwoman

- Born: November 5, 1848; Fayette County, Indiana, US
- Died: December 10, 1936 (aged 88); West Lafayette, Indiana, US
- Resting place: Riverside Cemetery, Cambridge City, Indiana, US
- Education: Glendale Female College, Glendale, Ohio
- Occupation: Farmer
- Known for: Founder, Indiana Federation of Women's Clubs
- Board member of: Purdue University trustee (1921–1936)
- Spouse: Henry Clay Meredith
- Children: Mary L. Matthews (adopted daughter); Meredith Matthews (adopted son)
- Relatives: General Solomon Meredith (father-in-law)

Virginia Claypool Meredith (November 5, 1848 – December 10, 1936) was an American farmer and livestock breeder, a writer and lecturer on the topics of agriculture and home economics, and an active clubwoman and a leader of women's organizations. Dubbed "Queen of American Agriculture" by the citizens of Mississippi in the 1890s, Meredith was also a pioneer in agricultural education. Between 1897 and 1903 she established the home economics programs at the University of Minnesota and served as the program's first professor. From 1921 to 1936 she served as the first woman appointed a Purdue University trustee. Meredith chose an unusual vocation for women of her time, successfully managing the day-to-day operations of her family's Indiana farm from 1882 until 1915. In addition to her agricultural-related work, Meredith was appointed to the Women's Board of the 1893 World's Columbian Exposition, serving as vice chair of the Women's Board and chair of its awards committee. She was also elected president of the Indiana Union of Literary Clubs, a founder of the Indiana Federation of Women's Clubs, and the first president of the Indiana Home Economics Association, founded in 1913.

== Early life and education ==
Virginia Claypool, the oldest of Hannah Ann (Petty) and Austin Bingley Claypool's eight children, was born on November 5, 1848, and grew up on Maplewood Farm near Connersville, Fayette County, Indiana. Newton Claypool, her paternal grandfather, was an early Indiana pioneer from Virginia who brought his wife from Ohio to settle in the wilderness. Austin Claypool, her father, became a prosperous farmer who was also active in politics and an early trustee of Purdue University. At the age of fifteen Virginia enrolled at Glendale Female College in Glendale, Ohio, graduating with honors in 1866 and earning a Bachelor of Arts degree.

== Marriage and family ==
Virginia Claypool married Henry Clay Meredith, the sole surviving son of American Civil War General Solomon Meredith and his wife, Anna Meredith, on April 28, 1870. During the war, Henry Meredith served as a second lieutenant and aide-de-camp on his father's staff. Henry's two brothers, Samuel and David, died from battlefield injuries.

Following their marriage the young couple resided at General Meredith's Oakland Farm, settling into the family's Federal-style home along the National Road near Cambridge City, Indiana. When Anna Meredith died about eighteen months after Virginia and Henry Meredith's marriage, twenty-three-year-old Virginia took charge of running the household. She also learned about raising livestock and running a farming operation from her father-in-law and husband. Henry Meredith managed the farm following the death of his father in 1875 and became active in politics, serving as president of the Indiana Board of Agriculture and was elected in 1881 to the Indiana General Assembly. While her husband served in the state legislature, Virginia Meredith oversaw the management of the family farm and began to show and sell livestock. When she was widowed at the age of thirty-three, after her thirty-eight-year-old husband died from pneumonia on July 5, 1882, Virginia Meredith became sole owner of the family farm and assumed management of its operation.

Four years after the death of her husband, Meredith took on the additional responsibilities of single motherhood. After the death of Hattie Beach Matthews, a close friend, Meredith adopted her friend's two young children, a daughter, Mary L. Matthews, who became the first dean of the School of Home Economics at Purdue University, and a son, Meredith Matthews, who attended Purdue University, worked as an engineer, and later moved to California.

== Career ==
Meredith became a nationally known woman farmer. For more than three decades she managed her Indiana farms and raised two adopted children. In the 1880s Meredith began speaking at Farmers' Institutes, forerunner to the Cooperative Extension Service, addressing audiences on various agricultural subjects. Her speeches on the topic of livestock management were a novelty for that time, when women rarely delivered public addresses and even fewer managed their own farms. The experience launched her career as a public speaker and writer. Meredith was a writer and editor for several years for the Breeders' Gazette, a livestock journal, and is considered the first woman to be hired by Purdue University's Agricultural Extension Department.

Beginning in 1882 Meredith assumed management responsibilities of Oakland Farm, which she inherited after the death of her husband. The family farm near Cambridge City, Indiana, was known for its find herds of Shorthorn cattle and Southdown and Shropshire sheep. In addition to managing the farm she became a livestock breeder, an unlikely vocational choice for a woman at that time, and won several prizes for her entries at livestock competitions. From 1890 to 1894 Meredith was also active on the Women's Board (also known as the Board of Lady Managers) of the World's Columbian Exposition, which took place in Chicago, Illinois, in 1893. Meredith served as the board's vice chair and chair of its awards committee. She authored "The Work of the Board of Lady Managers" describing their work. In 1895 Meredith was invited to speak at a farmers' institute at Vicksburg, Mississippi, where she delivered a speech titled "Profitable Sheep Husbandry" during a time in the Deep South when it was considered inappropriate for women to speak in public. On the final evening of the conference, Meredith was surprised with a gold medal that proclaimed her "the Queen of American Agriculture."

In 1896 Meredith moved to Minnesota, where she was the first preceptress at the University of Minnesota's School of Agriculture. Meredith was responsible for forming the university's home economics program and also served as the program's first professor. Between 1897 and 1903 Meredith served for six years as head of the home economic department at Minnesota, in addition to spending time at her Indiana farm when school was not in session. In May 1900 she sold Oakland Farm and purchased a 159-acre (64-hectare) farm south of Cambridge City. Meredith named the property Narborough Farm. Meredith returned to Indiana on a permanent basis following a disagreement with Frederich D. Ticker, the School of Agriculture's principal, that later led the University of Minnesota's board to request both of their resignations. Meredith resigned in 1903.

After returning to Indiana, Meredith resumed speaking at farmers' institutes while lobbying for support to establish a home economics program at Purdue University. Her involvement with Purdue had begun in 1899, when she first began speaking for the Farmer's Institute. Meredith's lectures across Indiana offered "to educate farmers on the latest science and technology in agriculture." She gave up day-to-day management of her Cambridge City farm in 1915 due to her advancing age and moved to West Lafayette, Indiana, in 1916 to live with her adopted daughter, Mary Matthews. After the move Meredith continued speaking and wrote articles for agricultural journals. In 1921 she became the first woman appointed to Purdue's board of trustees and served in that capacity until her death in 1936.

In addition to her agricultural work, Meredith was an active clubwoman. She was president of the Helen Hunt Club, a Cambridge City literary group, and the Cambridge City chapter of the Equal Franchise League. She was also president of the Indiana Union of Literary Clubs and a founder of the Indiana Federation of Women's Clubs. Meredith was named an honorary president of the Federation in 1918 when the two organizations merged. In addition, Meredith was the first president of the Indiana Home Economics Association, founded in 1913.

== Death and legacy ==
Meredith died at her home in West Lafayette, Indiana, on December 10, 1936, at the age of eighty-eight.

Purdue University's board of trustees paid tribute to her service at the time of her death, calling her "a woman of rare qualities" with "wide interests" who "created her own enduring memorial" through her public service and agricultural work. A collection of Meredith's papers are housed at the Purdue University Libraries, Archives and Special Collections in West Lafayette, Indiana.

Dubbed "Queen of American Agriculture" in the 1890s, Meredith was a successful stock-raiser who also oversaw the day-to-day operation of her Indiana farm, an unusual occupation for an American woman in the late-nineteenth century. She was also a pioneer in agricultural education. Meredith established the University of Minnesota's home economics program and served as the program's first professor. Her public lectures and lobbying efforts also helped to pave the way toward the establishment in 1905 of a home economics department at Purdue University, predecessor to its present-day College of Consumer and Family Sciences. Meredith became the first woman appointed to the board of trustees at Purdue, serving from 1921 to 1936. She believed that women had the right to work outside the home, as well as recognizing the important role that women had in caring for a home and family. Meredith, an active clubwoman, was involved with several civic organizations, most notably on the Women's Board of the World's Columbian Exposition from 1890 to 1894, as the first president of the Indiana Home Economics Association in 1913, and as an organizer of the Indiana Federation of Women's Clubs.

== Honors and tributes ==
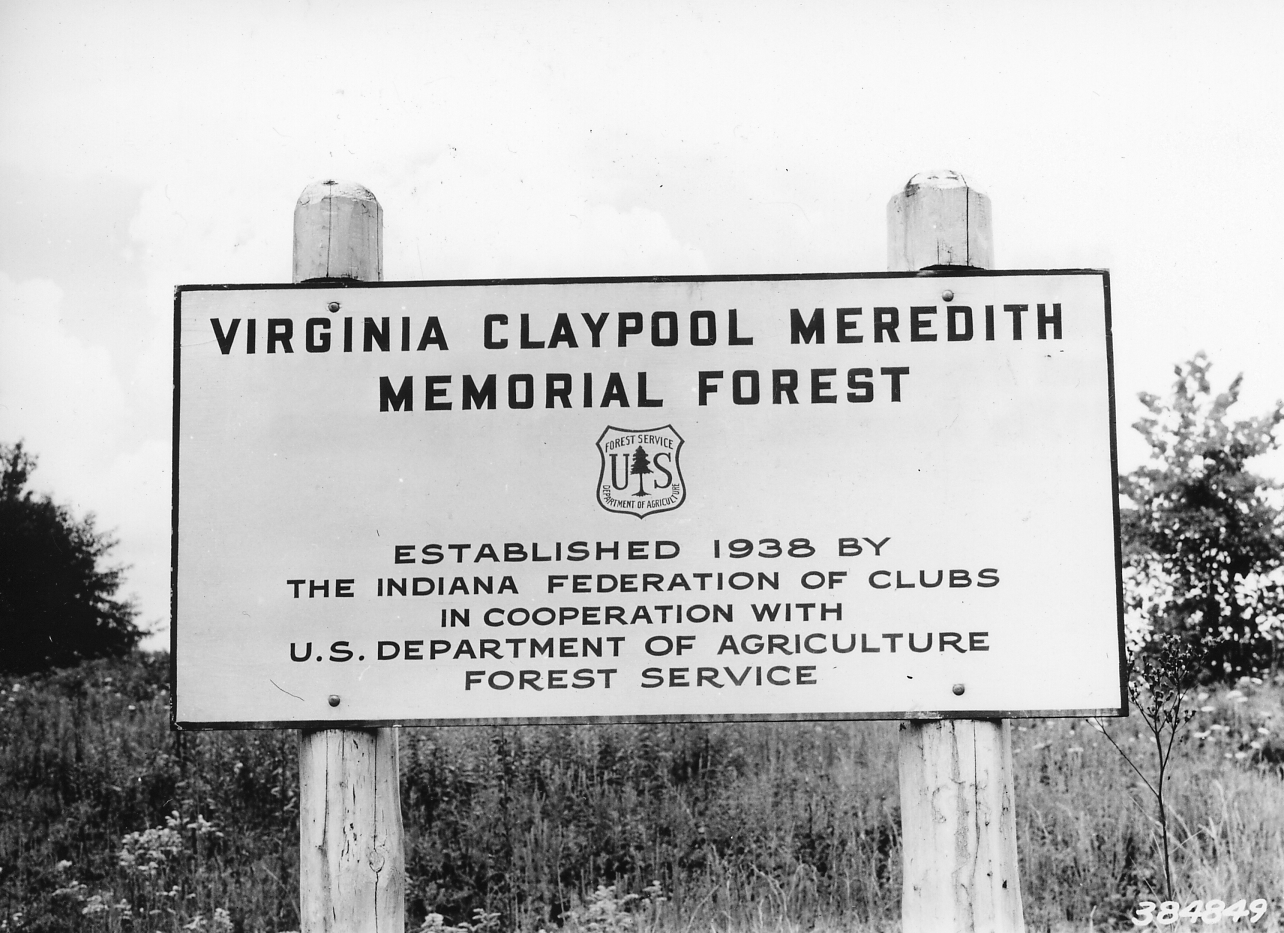
Sign on the Virginia Claypool Meredith Plantation – NARA – 2128407

- In the 1890s the State of Mississippi awarded a medal proclaiming her the "Queen of American Agriculture."
- In 1930 the State of Wisconsin gave her an award for her "eminent service."
- Meredith Hall, a women's residence hall at Purdue University in West Lafayette, Indiana, is named in her memory.
- The Virginia Claypool Meredith Memorial Forest, a project of the Indiana Federation of Clubs near Shoals, Indiana, was dedicated on May 27, 1938.
- A state historical marker installed on Main Street in Cambridge City, Indiana, was dedicated to Meredith in 2014.
