= Weathersfield Bow, Vermont =

Unincorporated community in Vermont, U.S.

Coordinates: 43°21′14.4″N 72°24′25.7″W

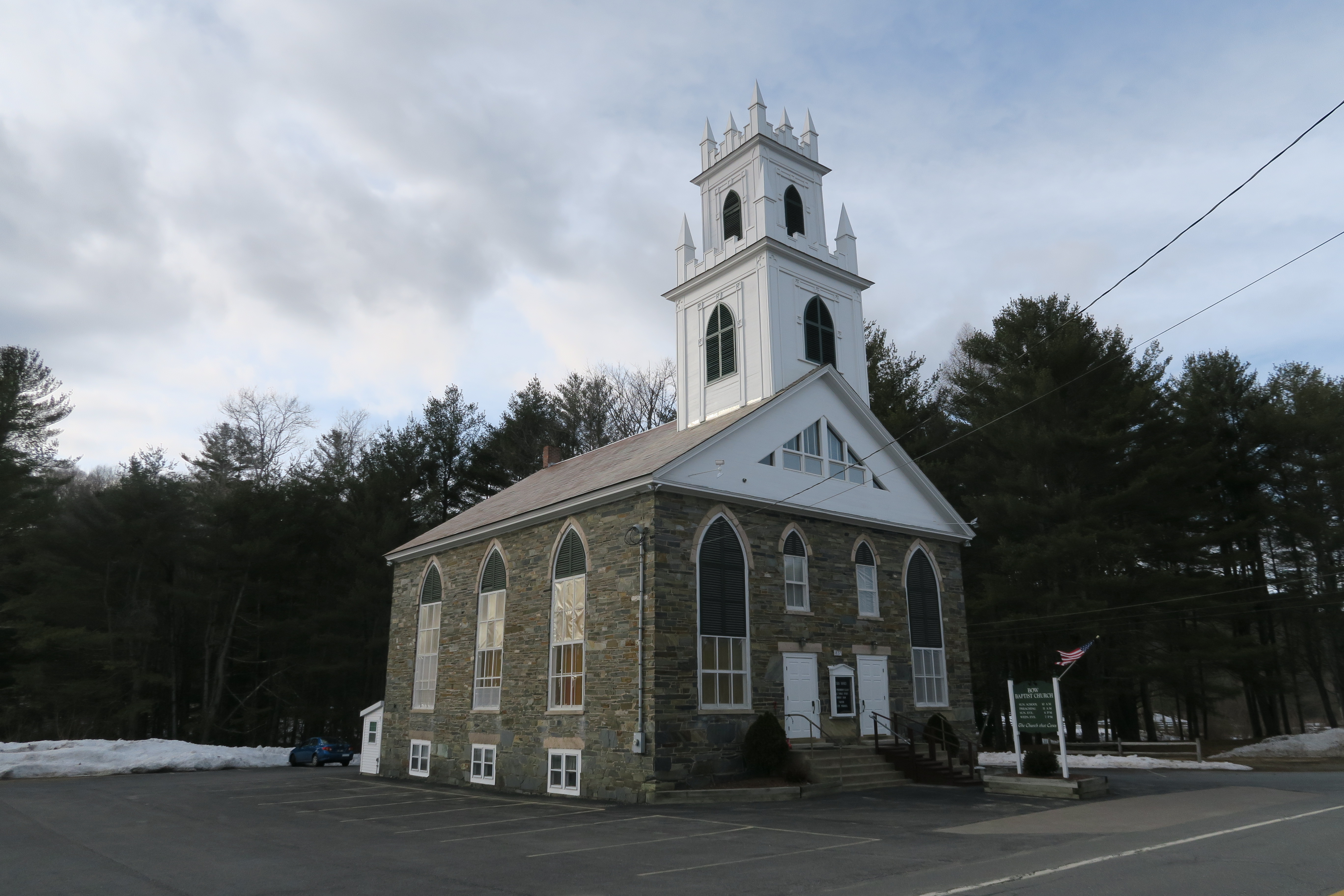
Bow Baptist Church

Weathersfield Bow is an unincorporated community in the town of Weathersfield, Windsor County, Vermont, United States. It is located in the southeastern corner of Weathersfield, along the Connecticut River. To the south lies the town of Springfield, and to the north is the village of Ascutney.

== Notable people ==
- William Wade Dudley, soldier in the Civil War, lawyer, government official and Republican campaigner
- William Jarvis, consul to Portugal under president Thomas Jefferson
