= New Hampton Community Church =

Historic church in New Hampshire, United States

- U.S. National Register of Historic Places
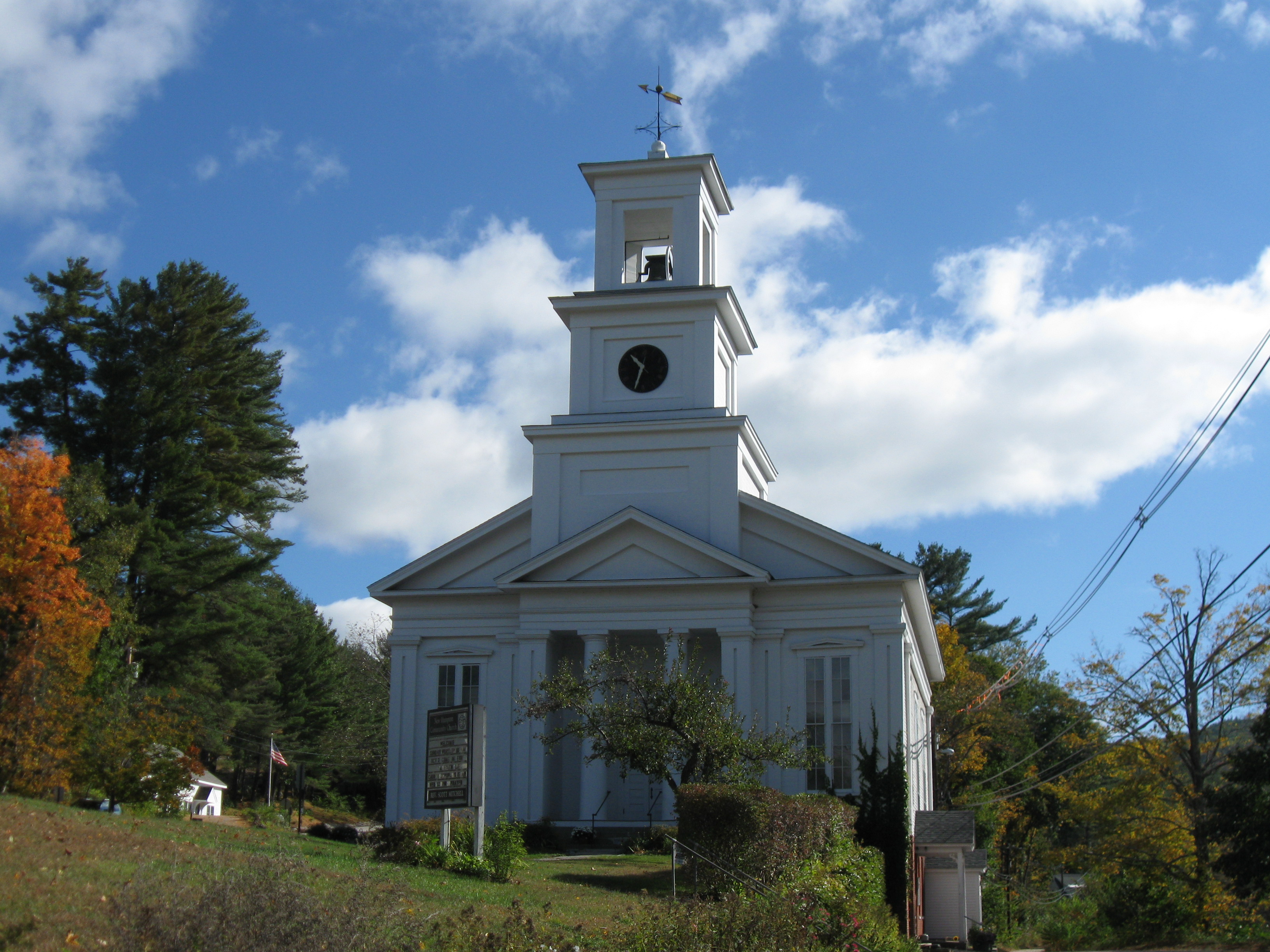

- Location within New Hampshire Location within the United States
- Interactive map showing the location of New Hampton Community Church
- Location: 12 Church Lane (intersection with Main St.), New Hampton, New Hampshire
- Coordinates: 43°36′23″N 71°38′55″W
- Area: 0.3 acres (0.12 ha)
- Built: 1854
- Architect: Zelotes, D.; Gordon, John S.
- Architectural style: Greek Revival
- NRHP reference No.: 85000474
- Added to NRHP: March 07, 1985

The New Hampton Community Church, formerly known as New Hampton Village Free Will Baptist Church, is a historic church on Main Street in New Hampton, New Hampshire. It is currently associated with the American Baptist denomination. Built about 1854, it is a prominent local example of Greek Revival architecture, and was listed on the National Register of Historic Places in 1985.

== Description and history ==
The New Hampton Community Church stands in the village center of New Hampton, on the south side of Main Street near its junction with Shingle Camp Hill Road. It is a single-story wood-frame structure, with a gabled roof and clapboarded exterior. It is an elaborately styled example of Greek Revival architecture, with paneled pilasters at the corners rising to a full entablature, and a fully pedimented gable fronted by a projecting gabled entry pavilion. The pavilion also has paneled pilasters, entablature, and pedimented gable, with the entry recessed in a flushboarded opening with two Doric columns set in antis. The roof is topped by a three-stage square tower, each stage finished with wide cornerboards. The first stage is plain, projecting behind the entry pavilion but partially in front of the main block, the second stage houses a clock, and the third has an open belfry. Each stage is capped by a cornice, and there is a weathervane at the very top.

The church was built in 1854 by a congregation formed by the union of two Free Will Baptist congregations, and its interior styling was updated in the late 19th century. A clock was added to the tower in the 1960s, and the kitchen ell dates to c. 1970. It was listed on the National Register of Historic Places in 1985.

== See also ==
- National Register of Historic Places listings in Belknap County, New Hampshire
