= Gordon-Nash Library =

- U.S. National Register of Historic Places
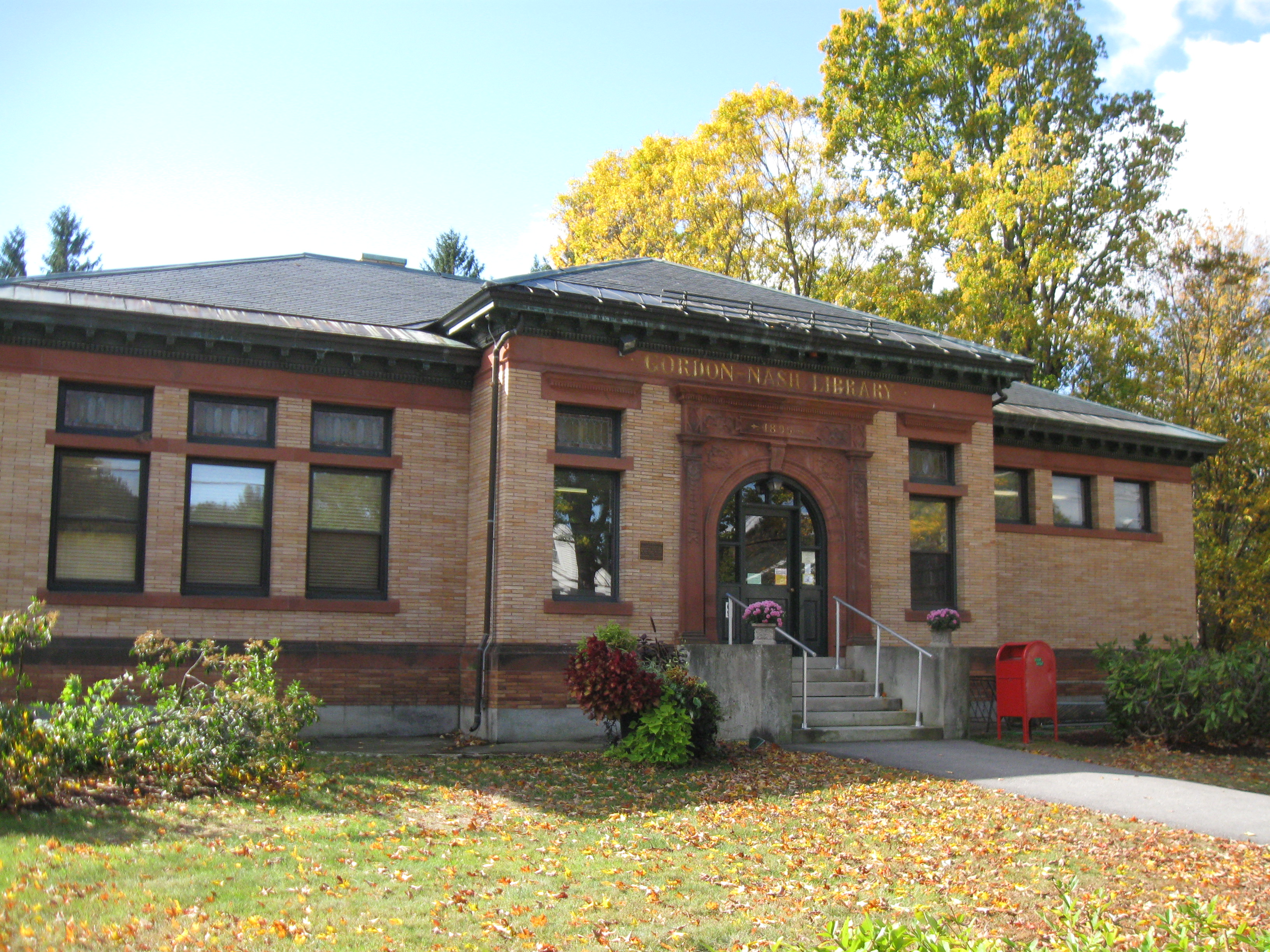

- Location within New Hampshire Location within the United States
- Location: Main St., New Hampton, New Hampshire
- Coordinates: 43°36′19″N 71°39′9″W
- Area: 1.1 acres (0.45 ha)
- Built: 1895
- Architects: Fuller & Delano; Gardner Cook & Son
- Architectural style: Renaissance
- NRHP reference No.: 88001437
- Added to NRHP: September 15, 1988

The Gordon-Nash Library is a private non-profit library at 69 Main Street in New Hampton, New Hampshire. Founded in 1887, the library is "the only private non-profit library in New Hampshire that is open to all residents, students and sojourners," and effectively functions as New Hampton's public library. It is housed in an 1895 Renaissance Revival building that was listed on the National Register of Historic Places in 1988.

== Architecture and history ==
The Gordon-Nash Library is located in the village center of New Hampton, on the south side of Main Street opposite the New Hampton School. The building consists of the original 1895 building, to which several additions have been made to the rear. The original building is a single-story masonry structure, built out of gold-colored bricks and covered by a hip roof. It has a three-part front facade, whose defining element is a central projecting hip-roof section. It has a central arched entrance, with a brownstone surround including pilasters and an entablature above the keystoned arch. The outer left section has three sash windows sharing a brownstone lintel, which are separated from transom-like windows by a similar header. The outer right section only has square windows in the transom positions.

The library was established on paper in 1887 by Stephen Gordon Nash, whose childhood home had been the location of a private subscription library founded in 1818. Nash died in 1894, having purchased land for the library building, but made no further steps toward creating the institution. In his will, he dedicated $10,000 for the construction of a building, and left the residue of his estate as an endowment for its maintenance. The building was erected in 1895 to a design by James E. Fuller of Fuller & Delano, architects based in Worcester, Massachusetts. It was the first purpose-built library building in Belknap County.

== See also ==
- National Register of Historic Places listings in Belknap County, New Hampshire
