= Alois O. Bachman =

Union Army officer (1839–1862)

- Born: May 17, 1839; Madison, Indiana, U.S.
- Died: September 17, 1862 (aged 23) Sharpsburg, Maryland, U.S.
- Buried: Springdale Cemetery, Madison, Indiana
- Allegiance: United States (Union)
- Branch: U.S. Army (Union Army)
- Service years: 1861–1862
- Rank: Lieutenant Colonel
- Commands: 6th Indiana Infantry Regiment (Company K); 19th Indiana Infantry Regiment
- Conflicts: Battle of Philippi; Battle of Rich Mountain; Battle of Brawner's Farm; Battle of South Mountain; Battle of Antietam

Alois O. Bachman (May 17, 1839 – September 17, 1862) was an American lawyer and Union Army officer during the American Civil War. He organized the Madison City Greys militia company, served as captain of Company K, 6th Indiana Infantry Regiment, and later became lieutenant colonel of the 19th Indiana Infantry Regiment, part of the famed Iron Brigade. He was mortally wounded leading the 19th Indiana at the Battle of Antietam.

== Early life and education ==
Alois O. Bachman was born on May 17, 1839, in Madison, Indiana to Alois O. Bachman Sr. (1790–1860) and Emily Thiebaud Bachman (1800–1850). He was the only son among seven children. Bachman attended Hanover College from 1856 to 1858, studying law and rhetoric. He then enrolled at the Kentucky Military Institute near Frankfort, Kentucky, for approximately two and a half years, receiving formal military training.

== Early military service ==
Shortly after the outbreak of the Civil War in April 1861, Bachman organized the Madison City Greys, a local militia company. In September 1861, this company was mustered into Federal service as Company K of the 6th Indiana Volunteer Infantry Regiment for a three-month enlistment. Bachman was commissioned captain of Company K. The 6th Indiana departed Indianapolis on May 30, 1861, for Grafton, Virginia (now West Virginia), and the next day marched to participate in the Battle of Philippi on June 3, 1861, one of the first land engagements of the war. The regiment then took part in the Battle of Rich Mountain (July 11, 1861) before mustering out at Indianapolis on August 2, 1861.

In late July 1861, Indiana Governor Oliver P. Morton promoted Bachman to major in the newly organized 19th Indiana Volunteer Infantry Regiment. In February 1862, he was advanced to lieutenant colonel.

== Command of the 19th Indiana ==
The 19th Indiana was organized under Colonel Solomon Meredith and Lieutenant Colonel Robert A. Cameron and was brigaded with the 2nd and 6th Wisconsin Infantry Regiments, later joined by the 7th Wisconsin Infantry, forming the "Iron Brigade" of the Army of the Potomac.

On August 28, 1862, at the Battle of Brawner's Farm, Meredith was severely wounded and unable to retain command. At 23 years old, Bachman took command of the regiment. The 19th Indiana's fierce attack helped stop Confederate attempts to flank Union positions, but the regiment suffered heavy casualties.

During the Maryland Campaign, Bachman led the 19th Indiana at the Battle of South Mountain (Turner's Gap) on September 14, 1862. His regiment charged Confederate positions on the gap, driving the enemy from the ridge and capturing prisoners.

On September 17, 1862, at the Battle of Antietam, Bachman led his men in a morning advance that pushed Confederate forces out of the West Woods. During a charge across the Hagerstown Pike and toward Farmer Miller's cornfield, he was struck by enemy fire and mortally wounded. Captain William Wade Dudley immediately assumed command of the 19th Indiana and withdrew the regiment under severe fire. Bachman's final words reportedly urged his men onward until he fell.

== Death and legacy ==
Bachman was evacuated from the battlefield but died of his wounds on September 17, 1862. His remains were returned to Madison, Indiana, and interred in Springdale Cemetery.

Bachman was the highest-ranking Indiana officer killed at Antietam. His funeral procession on September 26, 1862, was reported as the largest ever held in Madison up to that date, with six companies of the city guard and two cavalry companies escorting his remains. In 1998, the bridge at the foot of Hanging Rock Hill in Madison was named the Alois O. Bachman Bridge in his honor.
