= New Hampton Town House =

Historic church in New Hampshire, United States

- U.S. National Register of Historic Places
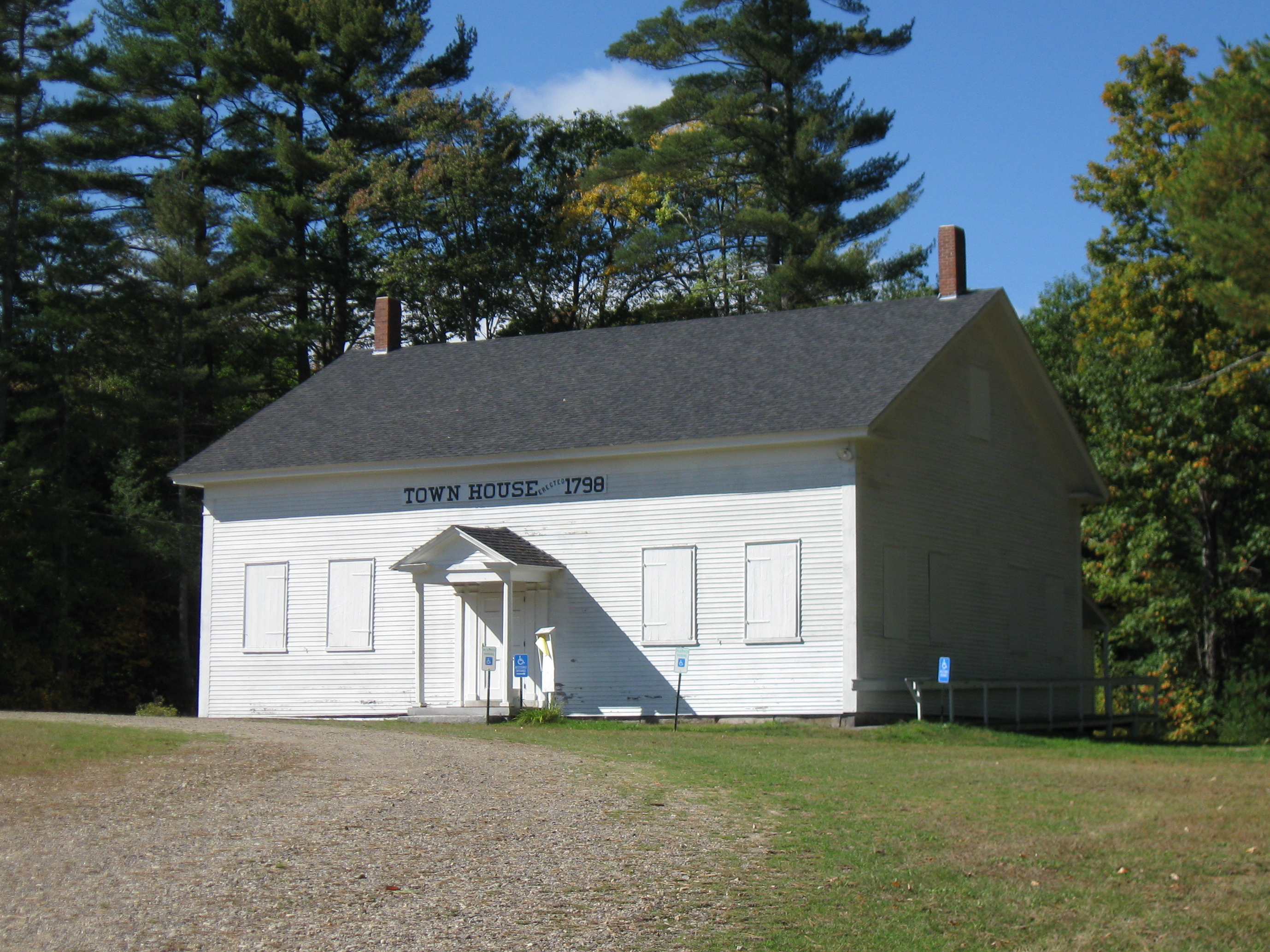

- Location within New Hampshire Location within the United States
- Location: Jct. of Town House Rd. and Dana Hill Rd., New Hampton, New Hampshire
- Coordinates: 43°37′27″N 71°37′43″W
- Area: less than one acre
- Architect: Kelley, Samuel
- NRHP reference No.: 98000198
- Added to NRHP: March 23, 1998

The New Hampton Town House (also known as New Hampton Meeting House; Center Meeting House) is a historic meeting house at the junction of Town House Road and Dana Hill Road in New Hampton, New Hampshire. Since 1799, it has served as the community's town hall, and is one of three surviving 18th-century town halls in Belknap County still used for that purpose. It was added to the National Register of Historic Places in 1998.

== Description and history ==
The New Hampton Town House stands in what is now a relatively rural context, on the north side of Town House Road at its junction with Dana Hill Road. It is a vernacular single-story wood-frame structure, with a gabled roof and clapboarded exterior. It is covered by a side gable roof, with brick chimneys at either end. The main facade is five bays wide, with a center entrance sheltered by a gabled portico supported by square posts. The entry is flanked by paired Greek Revival pilasters, with simpler pilasters found at the building corners. A series of small ells extend to the rear of the main block. The interior of the main block is principally occupied by a large chamber, with the additions providing space for a stage, kitchen, and other facilities. The stage curtain has been painted with a depiction of the building.

New Hampton was incorporated in 1777, and its early town meetings were apparently held in local homes or barns. The town voted in 1798 to appropriate funds for the construction of a meeting house, which was also to be funded by the sale of pews. By 1799 the building was sufficiently complete to house town meetings. As built, it was a typical late-18th century meeting house, with a second story gallery space and outside stairs. Because the building's religious function was dedicated to the Congregationalists, the local Free Will Baptists in the town built their own meeting house nearby, the Dana Meeting House.

The building was used for religious services by a declining Congregationalist group that finally disbanded in 1842. There is some evidence that a Baptist congregation also used the building for a time, but there was repeated discussion within the town over the need to update the building beginning in the 1840s. These discussions were finally acted upon in 1872, when the gallery level was removed along with the outside stairs, and the roof was lowered to its present height. The building was electrified in the 1930s, and the stage and kitchen were added in 1940.

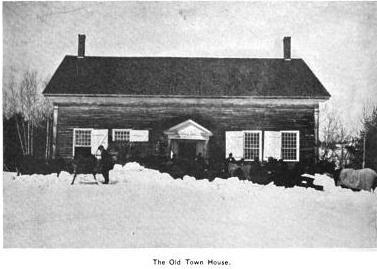
New Hampton Town House

== See also ==
- National Register of Historic Places listings in Belknap County, New Hampshire
