= Baron Stow =

Protestant Christian Minister

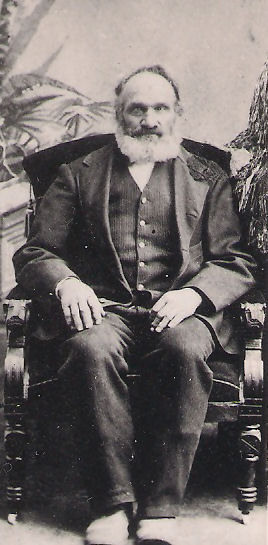
Baron Alanson Stow

Baron Stow (1801–1869) was a Boston Baptist minister, writer and editor, who in 1843 with Samuel Francis Smith compiled a Baptist hymnal entitled: The Psalmist, which for the next thirty years was the most widely used Baptist Hymnal in the United States.

== Early life and education ==
Baron Stow was born June 16, 1801, in Croydon, New Hampshire and graduated in 1825 from Columbian College, now George Washington University in Washington, D.C.

== Ordained ministry ==
In 1827 Baron Stow was ordained a minister in a Baptist church in Portsmouth, New Hampshire. He left there in 1832 to become pastor of the Baldwin Street Baptist Church in Boston. After 16 years, he left to become pastor of the Rowe Street Baptist Church, from which he retired in 1867.

== Death ==
Baron Stow died December 27, 1869, in Boston.

== Bibliography ==
- Baron Stow (1832). Memoir of Harriet Dow: Of Newport, N.H., who Became a Christian at the Age of Eight Years. In Ten Letters to a Niece. J. Loring.
- Baron Stow (1835). A History of the English Baptist Missions to India. American Sunday-School Union.
- Baron Stow (1839). A Brief Narrative of the Danish Mission on the Coast of Coromandel (2 ed.). New-England Sabbath School Union.
- Baron Stow; Samuel Francis Smith (1844). The Psalmist: A New Collection of Hymns for the Use of the Baptist Churches. Gould, Kendall, and Lincoln.
- Baron Stow, ed. (1846). The Missionary Enterprise: A Collection of Discourses on Christian Missions. Gould, Kendall and Lincoln.
- Baron Stow (1859). Christian Brotherhood: A Letter to the Hon. Heman Lincoln. Gould and Lincoln.
- Baron Stow (1864). "Early History of Our Missionary Organization, with Biographical Sketches of the Founders," in The Missionary Jubilee: An Account of the Fiftieth Anniversary of the American Baptist Missionary Union, at Philadelphia, May 24, 25, and 26, 1864, with Commemorative Papers and Discourses, (New York: Sheldon & Company, 1869): 89–138.
- John Calvin Stockbridge (1872). The Model Pastor: A Memoir of the Life and Correspondence of Rev. Baron Stow. Lee and Shepard.
