= Adoniram Judson Gordon =

American preacher and hymnwriter

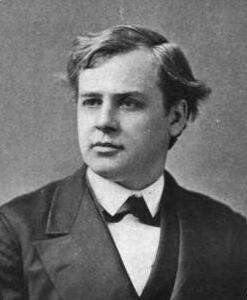
Adoniram Judson Gordon

Adoniram Judson "A. J." Gordon (1836–1895) was an American Baptist preacher, writer, composer, and founder of Gordon College and Gordon–Conwell Theological Seminary.

== Life ==
Gordon was born in New Hampton, New Hampshire, on April 19, 1836. His father, Baptist deacon John Calvin Gordon, was a Calvinist named after John Calvin. His mother was Sally Robinson Gordon. A.J. Gordon was named after Adoniram Judson, a Baptist missionary to Burma who had recently completed a Burmese translation of the Bible.

Gordon experienced a Christian conversion at age 15 and thereafter sought to become a pastor. He graduated from Brown University (then a Baptist affiliated school) in 1860 and Newton Theological Institution in 1863. In 1863, he married Maria Hale and became pastor of Jamaica Plain Baptist Church in Roxbury, Massachusetts. In 1869, he became pastor of Clarendon Street Baptist Church in Boston, a fairly affluent church. Under Gordon's leadership, Clarendon Street Church was described as "one of the most spiritual and aggressive in America". The church is no longer in operation. Gordon became a favored speaker in evangelist Dwight L. Moody's Northfield conventions. Every summer Gordon returned to his hometown in New Hampshire and often preached at the Dana Meeting House.

Gordon became suddenly ill with influenza and bronchitis and died at age 59 on February 2, 1895. He is buried in Forest Hills Cemetery. A son, Ernest Barron Gordon, published a biography of his father in 1896, titled Adoniram Judson Gordon, a Biography with Letters and Illustrative Extracts Drawn from Unpublished or Uncollected Sermons and Addresses, which is still in print.

== College ==
In 1889, with the help and backing of Clarendon Street Church, he founded Gordon Bible Institute and served as its first president. His wife, Maria, was secretary and treasurer until 1908. Gordon's school was founded primarily to train missionaries for work in the Congo.

== Writings and teachings ==
Gordon edited two hymn books and wrote the hymn tunes for at least fifteen hymns, including "My Jesus, I Love Thee," a hymn that has been included in nearly every evangelical hymnal published from 1876 to the present time. In his book The Ministry of the Holy Spirit, Gordon wrote, "It seems clear from the Scriptures that it is still the duty and privilege of believers to receive the Holy Spirit by a conscious, definite act of appropriating faith, just as they received Jesus Christ" (see Baptism with the Holy Spirit).

His most remembered work is probably The Ministry of Healing, a highly revered book on divine healing—physical, mental, and spiritual. Gordon located healing in Christ's Atonement, meaning it was universally available through faith in Christ. He prayed for the sick privately, however, and did not integrate healing into his regular church ministry. The Ministry of Healing became a standard work among early Pentecostals.

== Published works ==
- Adoniram Judson Gordon: A Biography
- Congregational Worship
- Ecce Venit: Behold He Cometh
- A Faithful Past; An Expectant Future
- The First Thing in the World, or, The Primacy of Faith
- The Holy Spirit in Missions
- How Christ Came to Church
- In Christ, or, The Believer's Union with His Lord
- Journal of Our Journey
- The Ministry of Healing, or, Miracles of Cure in All Ages
- The Ministry of the Spirit
- The Ministry of Women
- A School of Christ
- Shaping A Heritage
- The Twofold Life, or, Christ's Work for Us and Christ's Work in Us
- Yet Speaking: A Collection of Addresses

== Gallery ==
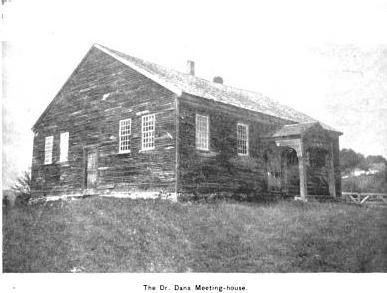
Dana Meeting House in his hometown in New Hampshire, where Judson preached during the summers

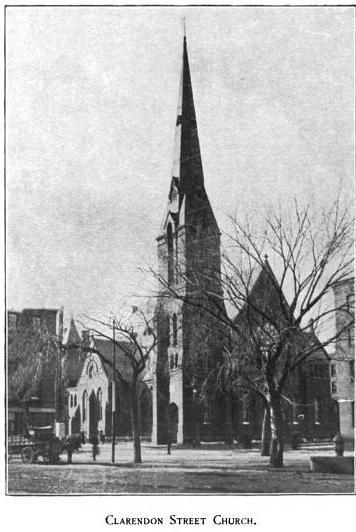
Clarendon Street Baptist Church in Boston

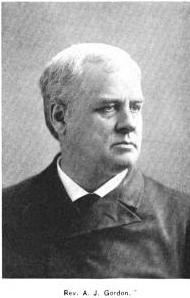
Rev. Adoniram Judson Gordon later in life

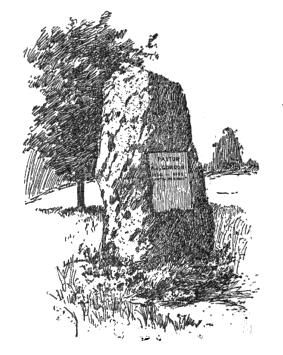
A.J. Gordon's grave
