= Weathersfield Center Historic District =

Historic district in Vermont, United States

- U.S. National Register of Historic Places
- U.S. Historic district
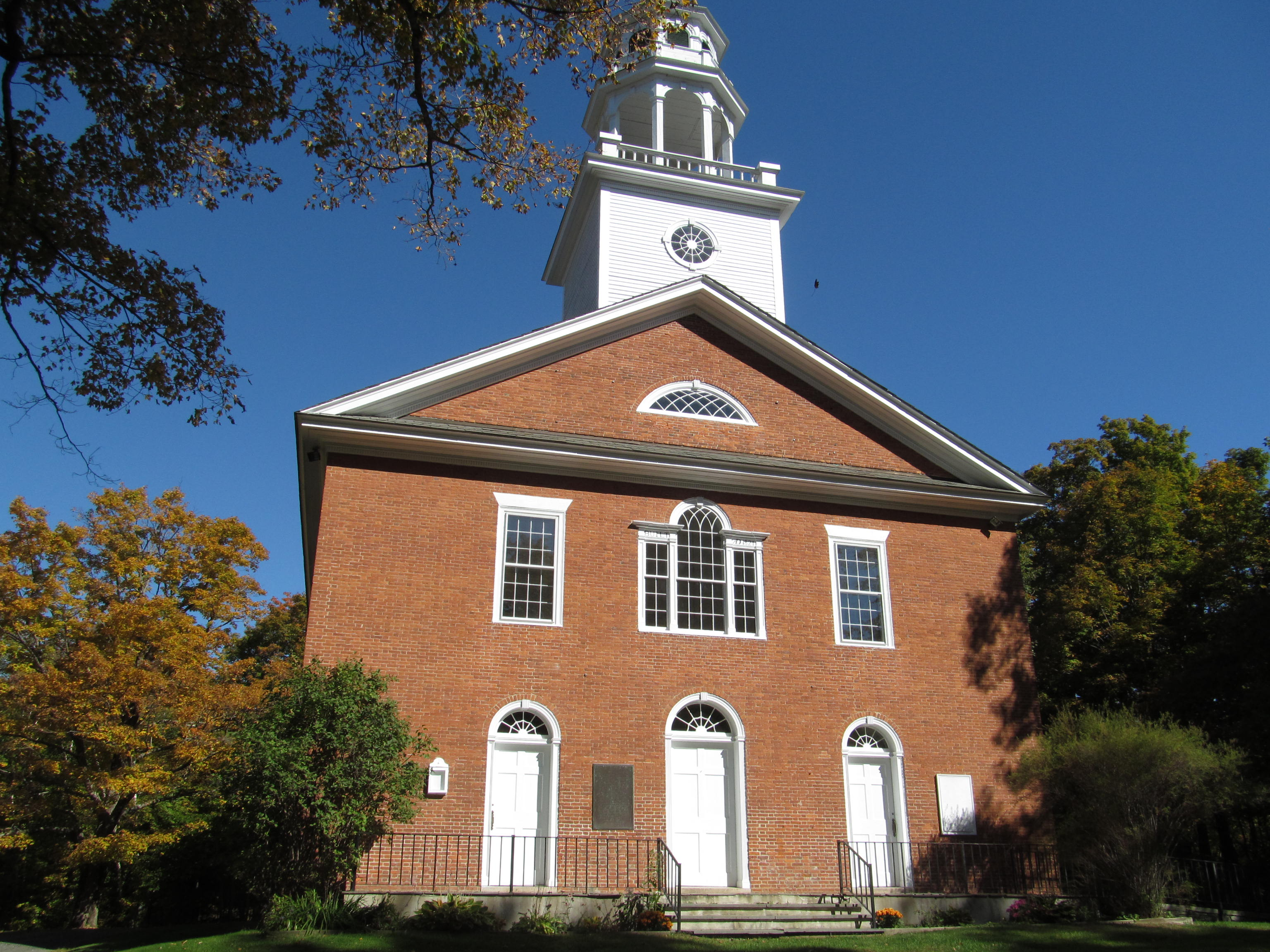
- The church in Weathersfield Center

- Location within Vermont Location within the United States
- Location: Center Rd., Weathersfield, Vermont
- Coordinates: 43°22′43″N 72°28′5″W
- Area: 20 acres (8.1 ha)
- Built: 1785
- Architectural style: Federal
- NRHP reference No.: 80000345
- Added to NRHP: June 30, 1980

The Weathersfield Center Historic District encompasses a small cluster of buildings and a historic site at the geographic center of the town of Weathersfield, Windsor County, Vermont, United States. It includes the town's second church building (the first having burned down), the home of its first settled minister, and an early stone animal pound. It was listed on the National Register of Historic Places in 1980.

== Description and history ==
Weathersfield is located in southeastern Windsor County, bordering the Connecticut River and New Hampshire to the east. The town was chartered in 1761 and saw modest settlement in the following decade. By the 1790s its population had risen to more than 1,000. Its early residents where Christians, who at first went to religious services at Claremont, New Hampshire, or were visited by traveling ministers. In 1785, the town voted to settle a minister, and built a simple 1-1/2 story Cape style house for him near its geographic center, now near the junction of Weathersfield Center Road and Goulden Ridge Road. Dan Foster was hired, receiving cash and staple goods as compensation. By 1825, when the town reached the height of its 19th-century population (more than 2,000), a Federal-style two-story house was built for the minister, to which the previous house was attached as an ell. This building, standing on the west side of Weathersfield Center Road, is now a historic house museum operated by the local historical society.

The town's first church was built near the minister's house in 1787, and was destroyed by fire in 1821. The town responded by building the brick Federal style meeting house, located southeast of the Foster House across Weathersfield Center Road. This building was built to serve both as a religious sanctuary and to house town meetings. It is a restrained example of late Federal architecture, with round-headed door openings on the ground floor, a Palladian window above the central entrance, and a fully pedimented gable above with an arched eyebrow window at its center. Rising from its roof is a multi-stage tower, starting with a square stage featuring a multilight oculus window, an open octagonal belfry above that, and a louvered cupola at the top. The building's gallery was converted to a full second floor in 1861 to formalize the separation of church and state, with the sanctuary on one level and town facilities on the other.

Located near the southern end of the church property is a square stone animal pound. It was probably built in the 1780s, after the introduction of a state law requiring towns to have such structures.

== See also ==
- Reverend Dan Foster House
- National Register of Historic Places listings in Windsor County, Vermont
