= 19th Indiana Infantry Regiment =

19th Regiment Indiana Volunteer Infantry
- Flag of the United States, 1863-1865
- Active: July 29, 1861, to October 18, 1864
- Country: United States
- Allegiance: Union
- Branch: Infantry
- Engagements: Battle of Second Bull Run; Battle of South Mountain; Battle of Antietam; Battle of Fredericksburg; Battle of Chancellorsville; Battle of Gettysburg; Battle of the Wilderness; Battle of Spotsylvania Court House; Battle of Cold Harbor; Siege of Petersburg

Commanders
- Colonel: Solomon Meredith
- Colonel: Samuel J. Williams

Insignia
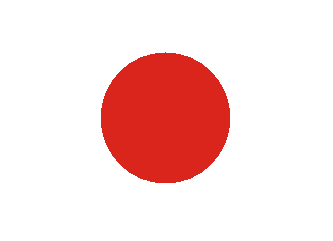
- I Corps badge (1st Division)

The 19th Regiment Indiana Volunteer Infantry was an infantry regiment that served in the Union Army during the American Civil War. It was one of the original regiments in the Army of the Potomac's Iron Brigade.

== Service ==
The 19th Indiana was raised at Indianapolis, Indiana, on July 29, 1861. Although raised in Marion County, Indiana the regiment itself was made up of men from across the state.

Original organization of regiment on July 29, 1861.
Company	Earliest moniker	Primary place of recruitment	Earliest Captain
A	Union Guards	Madison County	Isaac E. May
B	Richmond City Guards	Wayne County	William Wade Dudley
C	Winchester Greys	Randolph County	Robert W. Hamilton
D	Invincibles	Marion County	Valentine Jacobs
E	Delaware Greys	Delaware County	Luther Baughman Wilson
F	Meredith Guards	Marion County	John M. Lindley
G	Elkhart County Guards	Elkhart County	John R. Clark
H	Edinburgh Guards	Bartholomew and Johnson counties	Richard M. Kelly
I	Spencer Greys	Owen County	John H. Johnson
K	Selma Legion	Delaware County	Samuel J. Williams

The regiment saw severe fighting in the 1862 Northern Virginia Campaign. In their first battle at Gainesville, the 19th supported the left flank of the embattled 2nd Wisconsin, fighting Confederates near the buildings of John Brawner's Farm. They also fought in the main part of the Second Battle of Bull Run, where they, along with the rest of the Iron Brigade, were part of the rear guard covering the retreat of Union Army General John Pope, the 19th would lose 260 men out of 430 engaged. During the subsequent Maryland Campaign, the 19th attacked Turner's Gap in the Battle of South Mountain, and then suffered considerable casualties battling Hood's Texas Brigade in the D.R. Miller cornfield at Antietam. Lieutenant Colonel Alois O. Bachman was mortally wounded during the engagement, leaving command of the regiment to captain William Wade Dudley, the 19th would lose 12 men killed and 59 wounded.

During the first day of the Battle of Gettysburg on July 1, 1863, the 19th pushed a part of James J. Archer's Confederate brigade off McPherson's Ridge, and capturing a number of them in the progress. The 19th would bare the brunt of a Confederate counterattack in the late afternoon, but held their ground stubbornly. The flag would fall multiple times, and the entire color guard succumbing to bullets. Lieutenant Colonel William Dudley would be wounded during the fire fight. The Hoosiers would gradually give ground and then fall back with the Brigade, when the I Corps retreated to Cemetery Hill. The Iron Brigade and the 19th Indiana were sent over to nearby Culp's Hill, where they entrenched. They saw comparatively little action the rest of the battle. Out of 288 men, the 19th would leave Gettysburg with but 78 men present for duty. The regiment later served that year in the Bristoe and Mine Run Campaigns and in 1864 during the Overland Campaign and the Siege of Petersburg.

The regiment was amalgamated with the 20th Indiana Infantry on October 18, 1864.

== Casualties ==
The 19th Indiana suffered 5 Officers and 194 enlisted men killed in battle or died from wounds, 1 officer and 116 enlisted men dead from disease for a total of 316 fatalities.

== Commanders ==
- Colonel Solomon Meredith: July 29, 1861 - October 6, 1862
- Colonel Samuel J. Williams: October 7, 1862 - May 6, 1864 (Killed in action at the Battle of the Wilderness)
- Colonel John M. Lindley: May 13, 1864 - October 24, 1864 (on consolidation with 20th Indiana Infantry Regiment)

== In fiction ==
Lucas McCain of The Rifleman served as a lieutenant in the 19th Indiana during the war. This background was dealt with during an episode where McCain takes in a wounded southern veteran.

Deputy U.S. Marshals Eli Flynn and William Henry Washington from According to Hoyle by Abigail Roux both served in the 19th Indiana during the war, and then later served in the Indian Wars, before becoming Marshals together. Washington, at least, still carries his army-issued Colt .44 from when he served with the Iron Brigade.

George McLain, Chester Gerber and J.F. Turner in The Fourth of July trilogy are members of the Indiana 19th and the Iron Brigade.

== See also ==
- List of Indiana Civil War regiments
- Indiana in the Civil War
- Iron Brigade
