= Solomon Meredith =

American politician & US army general

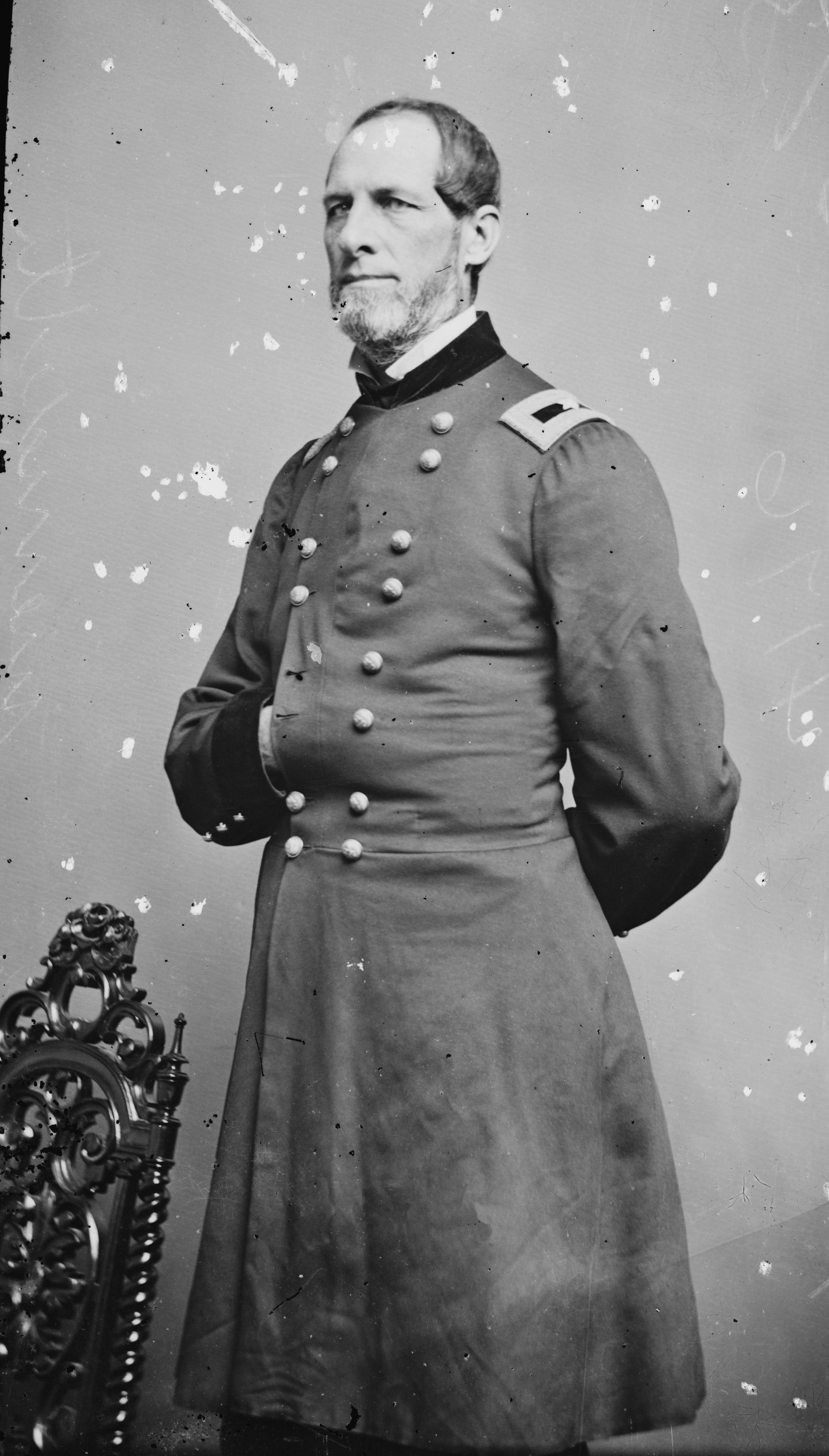

Member of the Indiana House of Representatives from the Wayne County district
- In office 1846–1848

Member of the Indiana House of Representatives from the Wayne County district
- In office 1854–1856

Personal details
- Born: May 29, 1810 Guilford County, North Carolina
- Died: October 2, 1875 (aged 65) Cambridge City, Wayne County, Indiana
- Resting place: Riverside Cemetery, Cambridge City, Indiana
- Party: Whig; Republican
- Nickname: "Long Sol"

Military service
- Allegiance: United States of America; Union
- Branch/service: United States Army; Union Army
- Years of service: 1861 – 1865
- Rank: Brigadier General; Brevet Major General
- Commands: 19th Indiana Infantry Regiment; Iron Brigade
- Battles/wars: American Civil War

Solomon Meredith (May 29, 1810 – October 2, 1875) was an Indiana farmer, politician, and lawman who became a controversial Union Army general in the American Civil War. One of the commanders of the Iron Brigade of the Army of the Potomac, Meredith led the brigade in the Battle of Gettysburg. Although he never fully recovered from the wounds he received that day, he became a prize-winning farmer and cattleman at home and hosted veterans of his unit.

== Early and family life ==
Solomon Meredith was born in Guilford County, North Carolina, the youngest of twelve children born to David and Mary Farrington Meredith. Meredith's grandfather, James Meredith, fought at the Battle of Guilford Courthouse during the American Revolutionary War. The Merediths were Quaker, and educated young Solomon at home. He was nicknamed "Long Sol" for his towering 6' 7" body.

In 1836 Meredith married Anna Hannah, a daughter of Samuel Hannah, who later became the 6th Indiana State Treasurer. Although their daughter Mary died as a child, their three sons survived to adulthood. The eldest, Lt. Samuel H. Meredith, served under his father and died at home in 1864 of wounds received at the 1862 battle of Gainesville. Captain David M. Meredith of the 15th United States Infantry won a brevet promotion to Major and died in Alabama in 1867. Henry Clay Meredith (1843–1882) survived and inherited the farm. Although born a Quaker, Meredith became a Methodist. He was a Freemason and member of the Independent Order of Odd Fellows.

== Career ==
In 1829, aged 19, Solomon left North Carolina, where Quakers faced increasing persecution for helping slaves escape, and walked to Wayne County, Indiana, where he found work chopping wood and working on a farm. He later clerked in a general store in Centerville, then opened a store in Milton, before moving to Cambridge City, the Wayne county seat. He owned a sprawling farm, "Oakland," near Cambridge City.

In 1834, Meredith won election as the Sheriff of Wayne County, and served for two years before winning election and re-election to the Indiana House of Representatives as a fervent Whig. During this time, Wayne County was important in the Underground Railroad, although leading businessman, and Guilford County, North Carolina emigrant, Levi Coffin moved to Cincinnati in 1847. Meredith represented Wayne County in the Indiana House until 1849, when newly elected Whig President Zachary Taylor appointed him U.S. Marshal for Indiana. He served four years, then again won election to represent Wayne County in the Indiana house, this time as a member of the new Republican Party.

While a legislator, Meredith supported education, as well as internal improvement projects. He supported the Whitewater Canal and worked with his brother-in-law, John S. Newman, to raise funds for the Indiana Central Railroad, ultimately acquired by the Pennsylvania Railroad, and later became president of the Cincinnati and Chicago Railroad Company.

== Civil War ==
When the Civil War erupted in early 1861, Meredith recruited hundreds of men from his county and organized them into a volunteer regiment of infantry. Governor Oliver P. Morton appointed Meredith as the first colonel of the newly named 19th Indiana, despite his lack of previous military experience. The regiment traveled by train to Washington, D.C., where it eventually joined the Army of the Potomac and brigaded with three Wisconsin regiments in what became famous as the Iron Brigade.

Meredith and his Hoosiers fought their first engagement during the Northern Virginia Campaign at Brawner's Farm, where his horse was shot from under him, crushing him and breaking several ribs. During the Maryland Campaign, Meredith took part in the Battle of South Mountain. He then abruptly reported himself unfit for duty due to the lingering effects of his injuries at Brawner's Farm and fatigue resulting from to the long march up from Virginia. He went to Washington to rest and recuperate while his replacement, Lt. Col. Alois O. Bachman, was killed while leading a charge near the Cornfield at Antietam.

As far as Brig. Gen.John Gibbon was concerned, he deserved to be stripped of his command for this. A month later, Gibbon was promoted to Maj. Gen. and given the 2nd Division, I Corps to command, then recommending either Colonel Lysander Cutler of the 6th Wisconsin or Colonel Lucius Fairchild of the 2nd Wisconsin to take over the Iron Brigade. However, Major General Joseph Hooker, who had commanded the I Corps at Antietam and was recovering from a wound sustained in that battle, was visited by Meredith requesting promotion to brigadier general.

Regardless of the Antietam fiasco and Gibbon's disdain for him, Meredith had powerful political connections in the form of Indiana Governor Oliver Morton. This was enough to convince Hooker, who submitted his request to Washington. In November, Meredith took the field wearing the stars of a brigadier general while John Gibbon fumed and cursed Hooker as a man who had sacrificed his principles for political gain. Meredith led the brigade in combat for the first time at Fredericksburg, where he drew the ire of division commander Maj. Gen. Abner Doubleday, who temporarily replaced Meredith with Col. Lysander Cutler.

In the spring of 1863, Meredith's brigade participated in the Chancellorsville Campaign, but saw relatively little combat. That changed in July, when the Iron Brigade suffered significant casualties during the first day's fighting at Gettysburg in Herbst's Woods and on Seminary Ridge. They were one of the first infantry brigades to reach the field. In the morning they routed the shocked and exhausted brigade of Brig. Gen. James J. Archer and captured Archer.

In the afternoon the brigade was ravaged by a flanking maneuver by the 11th North Carolina and a frontal assault by the 26th North Carolina, of Confederate Brig. Gen. J. Johnston Pettigrew's brigade. Meredith was wounded when he was struck in the head by shrapnel, fracturing his skull and giving him a severe concussion. The blow killed his horse, which then fell on him, breaking his ribs and injuring his right leg. He was disabled and unfit for any further field command.

Meredith performed administrative duty for the rest of the war, commanding garrisons protecting Union river ports along the Mississippi at Cairo, Illinois, and Paducah, Kentucky. While still on Army duty in mid-1864, Meredith unsuccessfully ran against George Julian for the United States House of Representatives. Openly feuding with his opponent, Meredith beat Julian unconscious with a whip, but used his political influence to have charges of assault and battery dropped.

== Postbellum life ==
With the war over in 1865, Meredith mustered out from the volunteer army with the brevet rank of major general and returned home to Indiana. Although he never completely recovered from the wounds he received at Gettysburg, Meredith resumed farming and became the local tax assessor in 1866–1867. From 1867 to 1869, he became the surveyor general of the Montana Territory. He then retired to his farm and raised prize-winning longhorn cattle, sheep, and horses. After the general's death, his son Henry Clay Meredith and daughter-in-law Virginia Claypool Meredith ran the farm and raised Meredith's herd.

== Death and legacy ==
Solomon Meredith died on his farm in 1875. He is buried in Riverside Cemetery in Cambridge City, Indiana.

The Grand Army of the Republic Post in Richmond, Indiana, was later named in his honor.

== See also ==
- List of American Civil War generals (Union)
