= New Hampton, New Hampshire =

Town in New Hampshire, United States

- Town
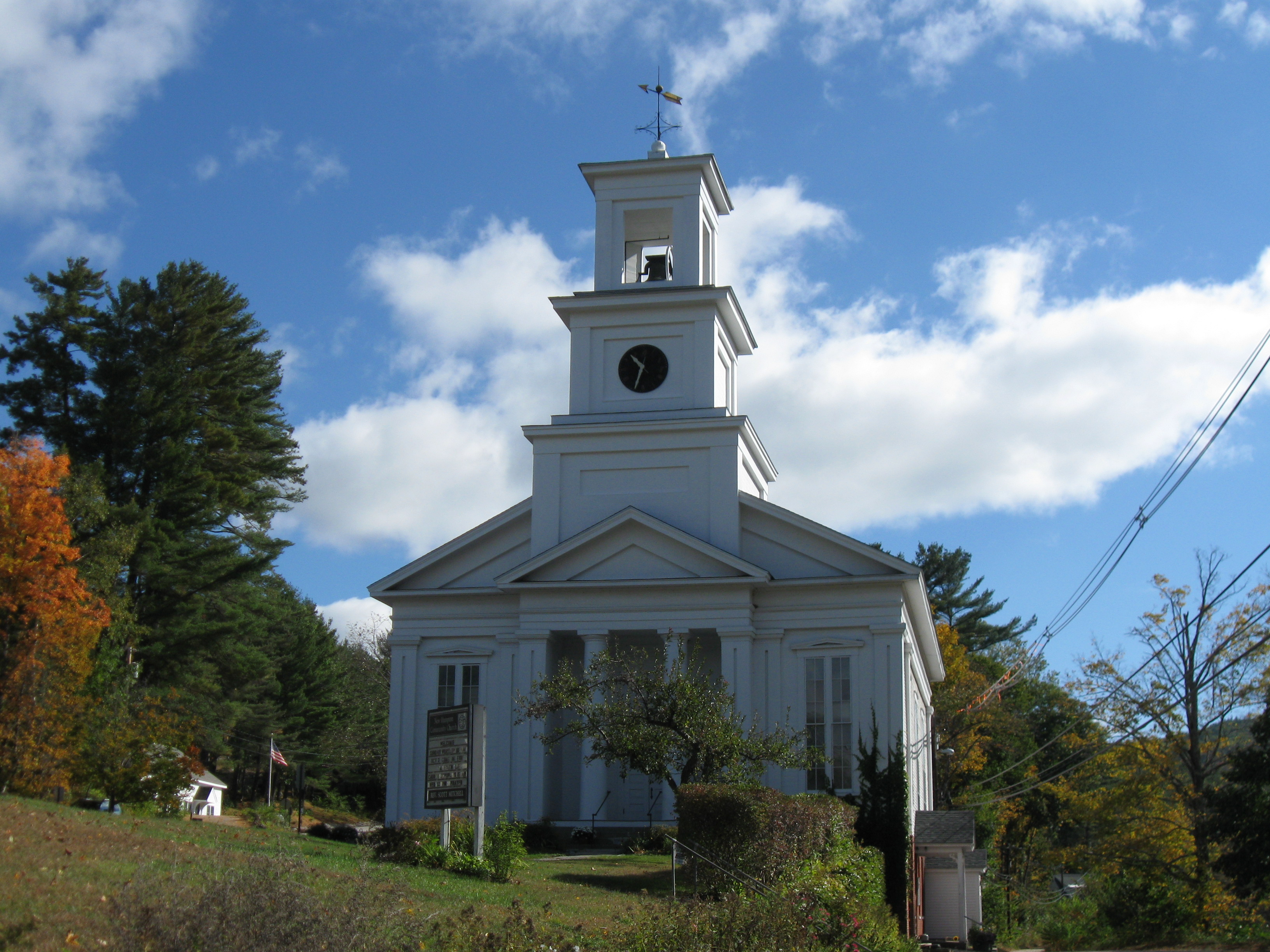
- New Hampton Community Church

- Seal

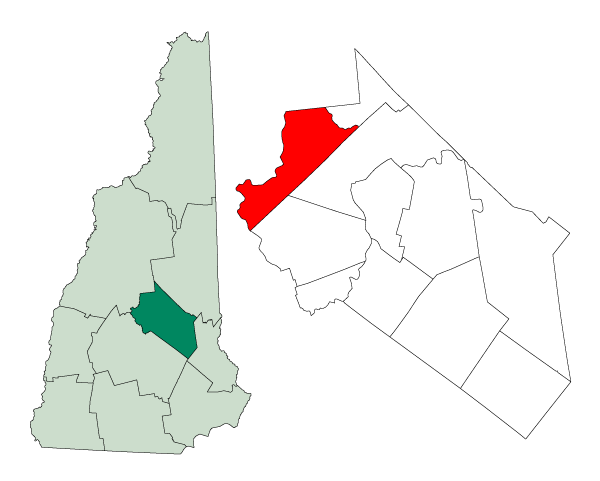
- Location in Belknap County, New Hampshire
- Coordinates: 43°37′29″N 71°38′3″W
- Country: United States
- State: New Hampshire
- County: Belknap
- Incorporated: 1777

Area
  - Total: 38.4 sq mi (99.4 km^{2})
  - Land: 36.8 sq mi (95.2 km^{2})
  - Water: 1.6 sq mi (4.2 km^{2}) 4.19%
- Elevation: 604 ft (184 m)

Population (2020)
  - Total: 2,377
  - Density: 65/sq mi (25/km^{2})
- Time zone: UTC-5 (Eastern)
  - Summer (DST): UTC-4 (Eastern)
- ZIP code: 03256
- Area code: 603
- FIPS code: 33-51540
- GNIS feature ID: 873679
- Website: www.newhamptonnh.gov

New Hampton is a town in Belknap County, New Hampshire, United States. The population was 2,377 at the 2020 census, and an estimated 2,428 in 2025. A winter sports resort area, New Hampton is home to George Duncan State Forest and to the New Hampton School, a private preparatory school established in 1821.

The primary village in town, where 373 people resided at the 2020 census, is defined as the New Hampton census-designated place, and is located along New Hampshire Route 132, just south of its intersection with Route 104.

== History ==
Granted in 1765 by colonial Governor Benning Wentworth, New Hampton was originally known as "Moultonborough Addition", after then-Colonel Jonathan Moulton, who held the position of town moderator. Moulton, who was born in Hampton, changed the name to New Hampton in 1777 when it was incorporated.

In 1821 the New Hampton School, a Free Will Baptist institution, was founded in the town. From 1854 to 1870, the institute was affiliated with Cobb Divinity School (later part of Bates College).

In 1920, the New Hampton Fish Hatchery, the state's oldest fish hatchery, was established in the town.

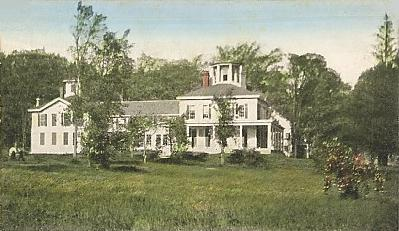
Lewis Mansion in 1909

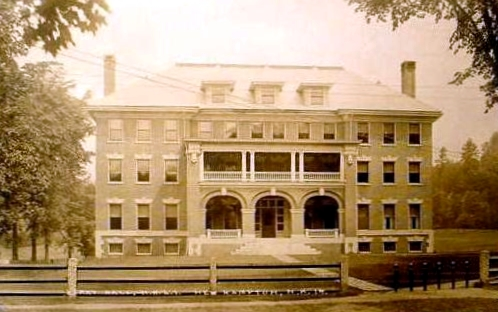
Berry Hall c. 1912

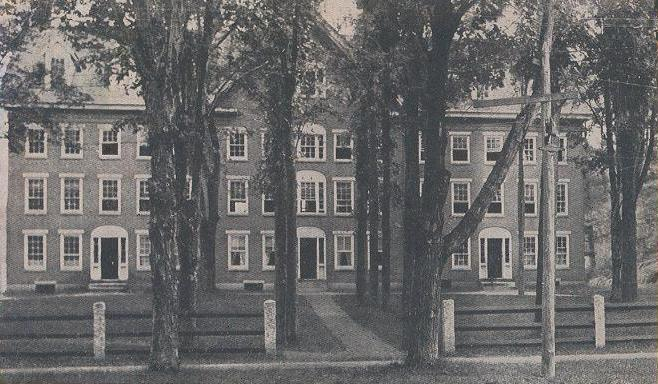
Randall Hall c. 1910

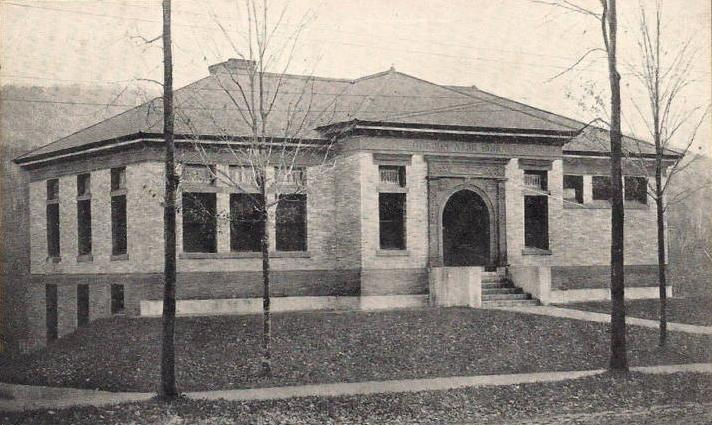
Gordon-Nash Library c. 1915

== Geography ==
According to the United States Census Bureau, the town has a total area of 38.4 square miles (99.4 km^{2}), of which 36.8 sq mi (95.2 km^{2}) are land and 1.6 sq mi (4.2 km^{2}) are water, comprising 4.19% of the town. New Hampton is bounded on the west and southwest by the Pemigewasset River. Pemigewasset Lake is in the center, and Winona Lake and Lake Waukewan are in the northeast. The highest point in New Hampton is 1,840 feet (561 m) above sea level atop the west ridge of Hersey Mountain, whose 2,001-foot (610 m) summit lies just over the town boundary in Sanbornton.

The geographic center of New Hampshire is located in the eastern part of New Hampton, between Winona Lake and Jackson Pond, at 43.67925 N, 71.580375 W.

The town is served by Interstate 93 and state routes 104 and 132. I-93 serves the town at Exit 23 and leads north to Plymouth and south to Concord. NH 104 passes east–west through the town, connecting Bristol to the west with Meredith to the east. NH 132 parallels I-93 as a local road, connecting Sanbornton and Tilton to the south with Ashland to the north.

=== Adjacent municipalities ===
- Ashland (north)
- Center Harbor (northeast)
- Meredith (east)
- Sanbornton (south)
- Hill (southwest)
- Bristol (west)
- Bridgewater (northwest)

== Demographics ==
Historical population
Census	Pop.	Note	%±
1790	652		—
1800	1,095		67.9%
1810	1,293		18.1%
1820	1,500		16.0%
1830	1,904		26.9%
1840	1,812		−4.8%
1850	1,612		−11.0%
1860	1,596		−1.0%
1870	1,257		−21.2%
1880	1,059		−15.8%
1890	935		−11.7%
1900	852		−8.9%
1910	821		−3.6%
1920	708		−13.8%
1930	692		−2.3%
1940	791		14.3%
1950	723		−8.6%
1960	862		19.2%
1970	946		9.7%
1980	1,249		32.0%
1990	1,606		28.6%
2000	1,950		21.4%
2010	2,165		11.0%
2020	2,377		9.8%
2024 (est.)	2,425		2.0%
U.S. Decennial Census

As of the 2010 census, there were 2,165 people, 848 households, and 617 families residing in the town. There were 1,083 housing units, of which 235, or 21.7%, were vacant. 185 of the vacant units were for seasonal or recreational use. The racial makeup of the town was 96.9% White, 0.4% African American, 0.1% Native American, 0.8% Asian, 0.0% Native Hawaiian or Pacific Islander, 0.05% some other race, and 1.8% from two or more races. 1.1% of the population were Hispanic or Latino of any race.

Of the 848 households, 30.4% had children under the age of 18 living with them, 60.4% were headed by married couples living together, 7.5% had a female householder with no husband present, and 27.2% were non-families. 21.0% of all households were made up of individuals, and 8.2% were someone living alone who was 65 years of age or older. The average household size was 2.49, and the average family size was 2.86.

In the town, 22.5% of the population were under the age of 18, 5.2% were from 18 to 24, 25.8% from 25 to 44, 31.1% from 45 to 64, and 15.5% were 65 years of age or older. The median age was 42.4 years. For every 100 females, there were 105.0 males. For every 100 females age 18 and over, there were 102.4 males.

For the period 2011–2015, the estimated median annual income for a household was $74,009, and the median income for a family was $73,913. Male full-time workers had a median income of $49,138 versus $43,250 for females. The per capita income for the town was $28,267. 6.6% of the population and 3.3% of families were below the poverty line. 8.3% of the population under the age of 18 and 13.0% of those 65 or older were living in poverty.

== Government ==
In the New Hampshire Senate, New Hampton is in the 2nd district, represented by Republican Timothy Lang. On the New Hampshire Executive Council, New Hampton is in the 1st district, represented by Republican Joseph Kenney. In the United States House of Representatives, New Hampton is in New Hampshire's 1st congressional district, represented by Democrat Maggie Goodlander.

== Education ==
New Hampton is within the Newfound Area School District. New Hampton Community School is in New Hampton. The district's secondary schools are Newfound Memorial Middle School and Newfound Regional High School, both located in Bristol.

== Sites of interest ==
- Dana Meeting House (c. 1800)
- Gordon-Nash Library (c. 1895)
- New Hampton Town House (c. 1798)
- New Hampton Community Church

== Notable people ==
- Mary W. Bacheler (1860–1939), physician; medical missionary in India
- Oliver Blake (1802–1873), businessman, Liberal member of the Senate of Canada
- Adoniram Judson Gordon (1836–1895), minister; founder of Gordon College
- Orren C. Moore (1839–1893), US congressman
- Simon W. Robinson (1792–1868), War of 1812 soldier, businessman
- Darius Songaila (born 1978), professional basketball player; attended New Hampton School
- Ernest Thompson (born 1949), author (On Golden Pond) (summer resident)
