= William Wade Dudley =

American lawyer, politician, and Union Army officer (1842–1909)

William W. Dudley
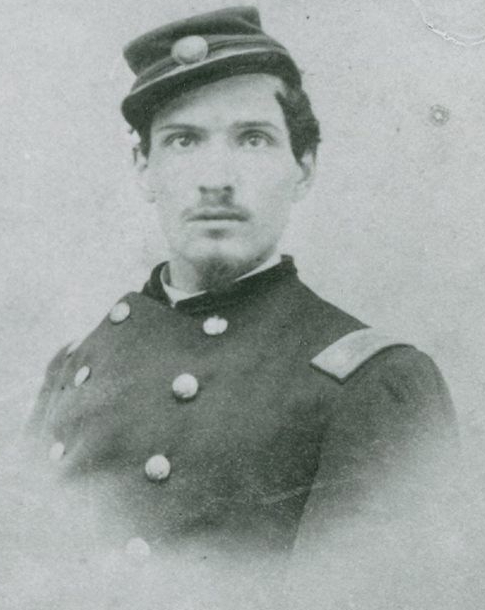

13th United States Commissioner of Pensions
- In office June 27, 1881 – November 15, 1884
- President: James A. Garfield; Chester A. Arthur
- Preceded by: John A. Bentley
- Succeeded by: Otis P. G. Clarke

United States Marshal for the District of Indiana
- In office 1879–1881
- President: Rutherford B. Hayes

Personal details
- Born: William Wade Dudley; August 27, 1842 Weathersfield Bow, Vermont, U.S.
- Died: December 15, 1909 (aged 67) Washington, D.C., U.S.
- Resting place: Arlington National Cemetery; Arlington, Virginia
- Party: Republican
- Spouses: Theresa Fiske; (m. 1864; died 1897); Nannie A. Robinson; (died 1949)
- Children: George Fiske Dudley^{(b. 1866; 1940)}; William Northrup Dudley^{(b. 1869; 1920)}; Charles Tarbell Dudley^{(b. 1878; 1908)}; Frances Therese (Dill)^{(b. 1880; 1920)}

Military service
- Allegiance: United States
- Branch/service: United States Army; Union Army
- Years of service: 1862–1865
- Rank: Lt. Colonel, USV; Brevet Brig. Gen., USV
- Unit: 19th Ind. Vol. Infantry Reg.
- Battles/wars: American Civil War: Maryland campaign; Battle of Antietam; Fredericksburg campaign; Battle of Fredericksburg; Mud March; Chancellorsville campaign; Battle of Chancellorsville; Gettysburg campaign; Battle of Gettysburg

William Wade Dudley (August 27, 1842 – December 15, 1909) was an American lawyer, politician, and Union Army officer in the American Civil War. He was United States Commissioner of Pensions under presidents James A. Garfield and Chester A. Arthur, and was Treasurer of the Republican National Committee. He was wounded and lost his leg at Gettysburg.

== Early life ==
William Wade Dudley was born in Weathersfield Bow, Vermont, the son of Reverend John Dudley, a well-known Congregational minister whose sermons were widely reprinted. Reverend Wade was a graduate of Yale Seminary, a sometime missionary to the Choctaw Indians, and a descendant of William Dudley, one of the earliest settlers of Guilford, Connecticut, in 1639. Dudley's mother was Abigail Wade, a granddaughter of Col. Nathaniel Wade, a staff officer to General George Washington during the Revolutionary War.

== Civil War and following ==
After studying at Phillips Academy, Danville, in Vermont, and at Russell Military Academy in New Haven, Connecticut, he joined the Union Army as captain of the Richmond City Greys—volunteers for service in the American Civil War. Dudley's company was incorporated into the 19th Indiana Volunteer Regiment of the famed Iron Brigade of the Army of the Potomac. During the Second Battle of Bull Run, Dudley captured a Lt Cosson who was wearing spurs that had been a gift from Robert Toombs; Dudley wore the spurs but promised that he was captured he would return them to Cosson. At age 19, at the Battle of Antietam, he took command of the regiment after the death of Lieutenant Colonel Alois O. Bachman. Following the battle, Dudley was quickly promoted to Major (September 18, 1862), and then Lieutenant Colonel (October 6, 1862).

After losing 79 percent of his men at the Battle of Gettysburg, and having his right leg amputated on the field, he served as an army inspector and judge advocate and captain in the Veteran Reserve Corps. For gallantry in battle, he was awarded an honorary brevet to Brigadier General of Volunteers on March 13, 1865.

Following the end of the war he became a civilian lawyer in 1870, then the U.S. marshal for Indiana in 1879, commissioner of pensions under appointment of Presidents James Garfield and Chester A. Arthur in 1881. In 1888 he was appointed Treasurer of the Republican National Committee. He returned to practicing law in 1887.

== 1888 election controversy ==
In 1888 having been made Treasurer of the Republican National Committee, Dudley was involved in the 1888 elections and one of the most intense political campaigns in decades, with Indiana dead even between the Democratic incumbent president, Grover Cleveland, and the Republican challenger, Benjamin Harrison.

Although this job did not strictly involve him in state politics, Dudley wrote a circular letter to Indiana's county chairmen, telling them to "Divide the floaters into blocs of five, and put a trusted man with the necessary funds in charge of these five, and make them responsible that none get away and that all vote our ticket," and promising adequate funding for this.

Unfortunately for the Republicans, the Democrats managed to get hold of the letter and they distributed hundreds of thousands of copies in the last days of the campaign. Given Dudley's unsavory reputation, few people believed his denials.

The attack on "blocs of five" with the suggestion that pious General Benjamin Harrison was trying to buy the election enlivened the Democratic campaign and stimulated the nationwide movement to replace ballots printed and distributed by the parties with the secret "Australian ballot". Benjamin Harrison's electoral votes topped Cleveland's to win the election. However, Dudley's reputation was destroyed, and he ultimately retired.

== Personal life and death ==
Wade married his first wife, Theresa Fiske, in 1864, and they had four children together. After his wife's death in 1897, he married Nannie A. Robinson and they stayed married until Dudley's death. She died in 1949.

On December 15, 1909, William Wade Dudley died of natural causes in Washington, D.C., and was buried in Arlington National Cemetery a few days afterward.
