= John Colby (preacher) =

John Colby

John Colby (December 9, 1787 – November 28, 1817) was an evangelist and itinerant preacher in the early Free Will Baptist movement in New England and various other American states.

Born to Thomas and Elizabeth Colby in Sandwich, New Hampshire, he became popular as a gifted preacher in his youth. Colby's preaching was instrumental in the conversions of hundreds of new believers and the formation of many new Free Will Baptist churches in Vermont, Rhode Island and New Hampshire. He was known as a self-sacrificing, humble man who travelled tirelessly from town to town throughout the United States in search of "lost souls". Colby developed consumption and died at the house of William M. Fauquier, Deacon of the Baptist church in Norfolk, Virginia at the age of 29.
