= List of people from Vermont =

State flag of Vermont

Location of Vermont in the United States

The following is a list of notable people who were born in the U.S. state of Vermont, live or lived in Vermont, or for whom Vermont is a significant part of their identity and who have entries in Wikipedia:

== A ==
- Bert Abbey (1869–1962), Major League baseball pitcher; born in Essex
- Charles Francis Adams (1876–1947), first owner of the Boston Bruins (1924–1925), born in Newport
- Charles Kendall Adams (1835–1902), educator and historian; born in Derby
- Frederick W. Adams (1786–1858), physician, author, violin maker; born in Pawlet
- Sherman Adams (1899–1986), politician, Chief of Staff for President Dwight D. Eisenhower; born in East Dover
- Eric Aho, painter
- Charles Augustus Aiken (1827–1892), clergyman and academic; born in Manchester
- George Aiken (1892–1984), governor and U.S. senator; from Putney
- Ivan Albright (1897–1983), painter and artist; lived in Woodstock
- Henry Mills Alden, editor of Harper's Weekly; born in Mount Tabor
- Ebenezer Allen, 18th-century soldier
- Ethan Allen, commander of the Green Mountain Boys
- Tom Atwood, photographer
- Fanny Allen, nun, namesake of the Fanny Allen Hospital in Colchester
- Ira Allen, one of Vermont's founders; brother of Ethan Allen
- Jerome Allen, author; born in Westminster
- Julia Alvarez, author; writer-in-residence at Middlebury College
- Trey Anastasio, vocalist and guitarist for Phish; attended University of Vermont
- Piers Anthony, science-fiction author
- Harriett Ellen Grannis Arey, author, editor, and publisher; born in Cavendish, Vermont
- Lemuel H. Arnold, governor of Rhode Island (1831–1833); born in St. Johnsbury
- Chester A. Arthur, 21st president of the United States; born in Fairfield
- Warren Austin, early U.S. Ambassador to the United Nations; born in Highgate
- Charlotte Ayanna, actress, 1993 Miss Teen USA
- Mary Azarian, woodcut artist, children's book illustrator; resides in Plainfield

== B ==
- Orville E. Babcock, American Civil War general
- Edwin Eugene Bagley, composer of "National Emblem" and other marches
- Maxine Bahns, actress, born in Stowe
- Arthur Scott Bailey, author of children's books, born in St. Albans
- Emma Bailey, first American woman auctioneer, lived in Brattleboro
- Brad Baker, baseball pitcher, born in Brattleboro
- David Ball, NFL football player
- Ella Maria Ballou (1852–1937), writer; born in Wallingford, Vermont
- Hosea Ballou, a father of American Universalism
- Bradley Barlow, politician; born in Fairfield
- John Barrett, diplomat; born in Grafton
- John S. Barry, 5th and 8th governor of Michigan
- John L. Barstow, 39th Governor of Vermont
- Daric Barton, baseball player; born in Springfield
- Evalyn Bates, educator; born in Williamstown
- Lindon Wallace Bates, civil engineer; born in Marshfield
- Stephen Bates, long-time sheriff of Vergennes
- Portus Baxter, politician
- Fernando C. Beaman, politician
- Orson Bean, actor, born in Burlington
- Alison Bechdel, cartoonist
- Johnny Behan, 19th-century sheriff of Tombstone, Arizona
- Hiram Bell, politician, born in Salem
- H. H. Bennett, photographer; raised in Brattleboro
- Wilson "Snowflake" Bentley, scientist and photographer
- Bill W., founder of Alcoholics Anonymous; born in East Dorset
- Charles E. Billings, inventor; born in Weathersfield
- Franklin S. Billings, 60th governor of Vermont
- Frederick H. Billings, lawyer, financier and president of the Northern Pacific Railway
- Henrietta A. Bingham 19th-century writer, editor, and preceptress; born in Burke
- Stephen Bissette, comic book artist
- Pamela Blair, actress; born in Bennington
- George Bliss, politician; born in Jericho
- Lou Blonger, saloon owner, con man
- Aretas Blood, locomotive manufacturer; born in Weathersfield
- Asa P. Blunt, American Civil War general
- Tom Bodett, spokesman for Motel 6
- Chris Bohjalian, author
- Murray Bookchin, philosopher, died in Burlington, credits Vermont Town Meeting tradition in his communalist social theory
- Andrew Bowen, actor
- Charles Bowles, minister
- Elmer Bowman, baseball player; born in Proctor
- Keegan Bradley, golfer, 2011 PGA Champion; grew up in Woodstock
- Ezra Brainerd, college president; born in St. Albans
- L. Paul Bremer, with Coalition Provisional Authority, Iraq (2003–2004)
- Richard M. Brewer (1852–1878), cowboy; born in St. Albans
- Francis Fisher Browne, editor, poet
- Orestes Brownson, activist
- Pearl S. Buck, author, died in Danby
- T. Garry Buckley, former lieutenant governor
- Ted Bundy (1946–1989), serial killer; born in Burlington
- James E. Burke, former chief executive officer of Johnson & Johnson
- Alex Burnham, of The Burnham Brothers Band
- Andre Burnham, of The Burnham Brothers Band
- Forrest Burnham, of The Burnham Brothers Band
- Steven T. Byington, anarchist

== C ==
- John C. Caldwell, American Civil War general
- John H. Caldwell, cross-country ski coach and author
- Thomas Cale, teacher and politician
- Delino Dexter Calvin, Canadian politician
- Jim Cantore, Weather Channel meteorologist
- Jake Burton Carpenter, owner of Burton Snowboards; from Londonderry
- Matthew H. Carpenter, Wisconsin politician
- Albert Carrington, clergyman
- Hanson Carroll, professional photographer
- Hayden Carruth, poet and critic
- Neko Case, singer
- William B. Castle, former mayor of Cleveland
- Lucien B. Caswell, politician
- Suzy Chaffee, skier, "Suzy Chapstick"
- Beth Chamberlin, fitness coach
- John Putnam Chapin, 19th-century mayor of Chicago
- Welcome Chapman, Mormon leader
- Harrie B. Chase, judge
- Horace Chase, former mayor of Milwaukee
- Dan Chiasson, writer
- Daniel Chipman, politician
- Nathaniel Chipman, U.S. senator from Vermont, federal judge for the district of Vermont, chief justice of the supreme court of Vermont, satirical poet
- Lucius E. Chittenden, politician in Abraham Lincoln administration
- Thomas Chittenden, first governor of Vermont
- Bonnie Christensen, artist, author, and illustrator
- Stoyan Christowe, writer, publicist and journalist
- Sylvester Churchill, soldier and journalist
- Joseph A. Citro, author
- Charles Edgar Clark, admiral during the Spanish–American War
- Ezra Clark Jr. (1813–1896), US representative for Connecticut's 1st district; born in Brattleboro, Vermont
- Kelly Clark, Olympic gold medalist, snowboarding 2002
- William Bullock Clark, geologist
- Skiing Cochrans, ski racers
- Richard A. Cody, U.S. Army general
- William Sloane Coffin Jr., clergyman; resident of Strafford
- Ben Cohen, co-founder of Ben & Jerry's
- Zerah Colburn (1804–1840), math prodigy; born in Cabot
- Lui Collins, singer-songwriter
- Ray Collins, baseball player
- Gardner Quincy Colton, pioneer of the use of nitrous oxide (laughing gas) for dental procedures; from Georgia, Vermont
- George Colvocoresses, American Civil War naval officer
- George Partridge Colvocoresses, admiral
- Jessica Comolli, Miss Vermont USA 2007
- Thomas Jefferson Conant, Biblical scholar
- George A. Converse, admiral
- Calvin Coolidge, 30th president of the United States; born in Plymouth Notch
- Barry M. Costello, US vice admiral; native of Rutland
- Douglas M. Costle, environmentalist
- Elizabeth Cottrell, geologist and museum curator
- Oliver Cowdery, religious leader
- Robert Cowdin, American Civil War colonel
- Aaron H. Cragin, U.S. representative and senator
- Mary Lynde Craig (1834–1921), president, Pacific Coast Women's Press Association; born in Vermont
- Donald J. Cram, Nobel Prize-winning chemist
- Jay Craven, film director, professor

== D ==
- Tim Daly, actor, producer, and director
- John Cotton Dana, museum director, librarian
- Jeff Danziger, political cartoonist
- Thomas Davenport, inventor of electric motor; born in Williamstown
- Howard Dean, governor of Vermont (1991–2003), Democratic National Committee chairman (2005–2009)
- John Deere, inventor of steel plow, founder of agricultural equipment manufacturer Deere & Company; born in Rutland
- David Dellinger, one of Chicago Seven; died in Montpelier
- Nicholas Deml, attorney, intelligence officer, and Commissioner of the Vermont Department of Corrections
- Davis Rich Dewey, MIT professor
- George Dewey, hero of the 1898 Battle of Manila Bay; only admiral of the Navy ever appointed in America
- Joel Dewey, brigadier general, Union Army
- John Dewey, philosopher, psychologist, and educator, born in Burlington
- Michael Dante DiMartino, co-creator, executive producer, writer, and story editor of the animated TV series, Avatar: The Last Airbender and The Legend of Korra.
- Charles Doolittle, brigadier general under Andrew Johnson
- Julia Caroline Dorr, author
- Stephen A. Douglas, U.S. senator from Illinois; born in Brandon; nominated for president in 1860
- A. E. Douglass, astronomer
- Bobby Dragon, NASCAR driver; Milton
- Norman Dubie, poet
- Jean Dubuc, baseball pitcher; born in St. Johnsbury
- William Wade Dudley, politician
- Chris Duffy, baseball player; born in Brattleboro
- Charles Durkee, governor of Utah Territory and U.S. senator

== E ==
- Horatio Earle, promoted "good roads" when the automobile was introduced
- Dorman Bridgman Eaton, instrumental in federal civil service reform
- John Eaton, Army colonel, U.S. commissioner of education
- Scot Eaton, comic book artist
- Eddy Brothers, psychics
- George F. Edmunds, senator; born in Richmond
- Merritt A. Edson, decorated U.S. Marine officer; born in Chester
- Chesselden Ellis, politician; born in Windsor
- George F. Emmons, admiral; born in Clarendon
- Roger Enos, general in the American revolution
- Jacob Estey, organ manufacturer
- Jeremiah Evarts, missionary and reformer; born in Sunderland

== F ==
- Franklin Fairbanks, political figure, philanthropist, co-founder of Rollins College, president of Fairbanks Scales
- William Fairfield, Canada politician
- John C. Farrar, book publisher; born in Burlington
- Thomas Green Fessenden, early American writer
- Young Firpo, boxer
- Dorothy Canfield Fisher, writer; died in Arlington
- Robert M. Fisher, abstract artist
- Jon Fishman, drummer, vocalist from band Phish
- Carlton Fisk, Baseball Hall of Fame catcher; born in Bellows Falls
- James Fisk, financier
- Irving Fiske, playwright; lived in Rochester
- William Charles Fitzgerald, naval officer; born in Montpelier
- John Fitzpatrick, former mayor of New Orleans; born in Fairfield
- Ed Flanagan, auditor of accounts and state senator
- Helen Hartness Flanders, collector of traditional ballads
- Ralph Flanders, industrialist and senator
- Henry A. Fletcher, American Civil War soldier, politician
- George P. Foster, American Civil War general
- Hal Fowler, professional poker player
- Simon Fraser, fur trader, Canada explorer
- Martin Henry Freeman, college president
- Robert Frost, iconic poet; poet laureate of Vermont
- Ida May Fuller, first recipient of Social Security
- John Fusco, film producer, screenwriter of Hidalgo and Young Guns

== G ==
- Phineas Gage, railroad man, medical test patient
- Barbara Galpin, journalist; born in Weathersfield, Vermont
- Larry Gardner, baseball player; born in Enosburgh
- Elmina M. Roys Gavitt, physician; born in Fletcher
- David Giancola, film director; born in Rutland
- Cynthia Gibb, actress; born in Bennington
- Amanda Gilman, Miss Vermont USA 2006
- Joseph A. Gilmore, governor of New Hampshire (1863–1865)
- Louise Glück, Pulitzer Prize-winning poet
- Thyrza Nichols Goodeve, writer
- Isaac Goodnow, founder of Kansas State University and Manhattan, Kansas; born in Whitingham
- Mike Gordon, vocals, bassist from band Phish; attended UVM
- Walter W. Granger, paleontologist; born in Middletown Springs
- Lewis A. Grant, American Civil War soldier
- Duane Graveline, astronaut; born in Newport
- Milford Graves, drummer
- Peter Gray, psychologist
- Horace Greeley, editor, reformer, politician; apprenticed in East Poultney
- Hetty Green, financier from Bellows Falls
- Theodore P. Greene, admiral during American Civil War
- Wallace M. Greene, U.S. Marine general
- Jerry Greenfield, co-founder of Ben & Jerry's ice cream
- Josiah Grout, Canadian-born politician; 46th governor of Vermont
- Efrain Guigui, orchestra conductor
- Albert Gutterson, athlete in the long jump
- Luis Guzmán, actor; resides in Sutton

== H ==
- Paul Hackett, football coach; born in Burlington
- William Haile, politician
- Joy Hakim, author; attended school in Rutland
- Enoch Hale, American Revolutionary War officer
- Hiland Hall, judge and governor of Vermont
- Lucy Mabel Hall-Brown, physician; born in Holland
- William Laurel Harris, muralist
- James Hartness, machine tool entrepreneur
- Bill Haugland, Canada television journalist
- William Babcock Hazen, American Civil War general
- Chris Hedges, journalist
- William W. Henry, American Civil War colonel
- John A. Hill, co-founder of McGraw-Hill
- Ethan A. Hitchcock, major general during the American Civil War
- Edward Hoagland, essayist, taught at Bennington College; retired to Sutton
- Frederick Holbrook, former governor of Vermont
- Tristan Honsinger, jazz cellist; born in Burlington
- Samuel Hopkins, holder of first American patent, for pearl and potash process, 1790
- Charles Snead Houston, mountaineer, physician, scientist, and Peace Corps leader
- Charles Edward Hovey, educator, American Civil War general
- Jacob M. Howard, 19th-century politician
- James F. Howard Jr., professor of medicine
- Steven James Howard, politician
- William Alanson Howard, politician
- Felicity Huffman, actress; attended school in Putney
- Stephen Huneck, artist
- Richard Morris Hunt, architect
- William Morris Hunt, painter
- Stanley Edgar Hyman, literary critic; taught at Bennington

== I ==
- James Monroe Ingalls, ballistics expert
- John Irving, author

== J ==
- Horatio Nelson Jackson, auto pioneer; attended University of Vermont
- William Henry Jackson, painter; raised in Rutland
- Lindsey Jacobellis, snowboarder; from Stratton
- Jim Jeffords, politician; born in Rutland
- Milo Parker Jewett, educator
- Andrew Johnson, skier; born in Greensboro
- Ernie Johnson, baseball pitcher; born in Brattleboro
- Kenny Johnson, actor, The Shield
- Luke S. Johnson, religious leader
- Lyman E. Johnson, religious leader
- George Jones, publisher and co-founder of The New York Times
- Miranda July, screenwriter and actress; born in Barre

== K ==
- Noah Kahan, musician from Strafford
- Bob Keeshan (1927–2004), television personality "Captain Kangaroo"; lived last 14 years of his life in Vermont
- A. Atwater Kent (1873–1949), inventor and radio maker; born in Burlington
- Henry W. Keyes, politician; born in Newbury
- Dan Kiley, landscape architect
- Christopher Kimball, host of PBS television's America's Test Kitchen
- Heber C. Kimball, religious leader
- Jamaica Kincaid, novelist
- King Tuff, musician
- Rudyard Kipling, British author; resident of Brattleboro when he wrote The Jungle Book
- M. Jane Kitchel, politician; born in St. Johnsbury
- Bill Koch, skier, Olympic silver medalist; born in Brattleboro
- James Kochalka, comic book artist
- Ed Koren, illustrator and cartoonist for The New Yorker
- Madeleine M. Kunin, ambassador

== L ==
- Walt Lanfranconi, baseball player; from Barre
- Shane Lavalette, photographer, publisher and editor of Lavalette; director of Light Work, a non-profit photography organization
- Patrick Leahy, U.S. senator since 1975; born in Montpelier
- John LeClair, first native-born Vermonter to play in National Hockey League; born in St. Albans
- Bill "Spaceman" Lee, baseball pitcher
- Harry David Lee, developer of Lee Jeans; educated in Tunbridge
- Brady Leisenring, hockey player; from Stowe
- Henry M. Leland, developed Cadillac and Lincoln automobiles; born in Barton
- Emmanuel Lemelson, Greek Orthodox priest, social commentator and hedge fund manager
- Melissa Leo, Academy Award-winning actress, resided in Putney
- Kevin Lepage, NASCAR driver; from Shelburne
- Joanna 'JoJo' Levesque (born 1990), singer, actress; born in Brattleboro
- Aaron Lewis, band member; from Rutland
- Barbour Lewis US Congressman
- Sinclair Lewis (1885–1951), Nobel Prize-winning author; lived in Barnard
- Sam Lloyd, actor (Scrubs); born in Weston
- Ki Longfellow, novelist
- Alfred Lebbeus Loomis, president, Association of American Physicians
- Gustavus Loomis, breveted brigadier general
- Horatio G. Loomis, organizer of Chicago Board of Trade
- Phillips Lord, creator of radio programs; born in Hartford
- Will Lyman, actor; born in Burlington
- Lucius Lyon, helped charter state of Michigan; born in Shelburne

== M ==
- Margaret MacArthur, musician, folk music archivist known as "Vermont's Songcatcher"
- Sean Patrick Maloney, Canadian-born U.S. representative from New York since 2013
- David Mamet, playwright, screenwriter, film director; attended Goddard College
- Zosia Mamet, actress and musician
- Zophar M. Mansur, lieutenant governor
- William Marks, religious leader; born in Rutland
- Anna Marsh, philanthropist; created Brattleboro Retreat
- Craig Martell, inaugural Chief Digital and Artificial Intelligence Officer for the U.S. Department of Defense
- John Martin, businessman; born in Peacham
- Philip Maxwell, physician and politician; namesake of Chicago's Maxwell Street; born in Guilford
- Henry T. Mayo, four-star admiral; born in Burlington
- Archer Mayor, author; lives in Newfane
- John McCardell Jr., educator
- Page McConnell, keyboardist and vocalist for the band Phish
- Bill McKibben, environmentalist
- James Meacham, politician; born in Rutland
- William Rutherford Mead, architect; born in Brattleboro
- Andrea Mead Lawrence, first American to win two Olympic skiing gold medals; born in Rutland County
- Samuel Merrill, Indiana politician; born in Peacham
- Sarah M. Dawson Merrill, educator
- Alexander Kennedy Miller, proponent of Autogyro
- Frank Miller, creator of comic books, graphic novels; raised in Montpelier
- Susan Tolman Mills, educator; born in Enosburgh
- Ross Miner (born 1991), skating coach and retired competitive figure skater
- Graham Mink, hockey player
- Anaïs Mitchell, singer; raised in Addison County
- Samuel Morey, inventor
- Justin Morgan, horse breeder; died in Randolph
- Justin Smith Morrill, sponsor of Land Grant College Act establishing "public ivies"
- George Sylvester Morris, educator
- Levi P. Morton, vice president of the United States and governor of New York; born in Shoreham
- Howard Frank Mosher, author
- Joseph A. Mower, Civil War general; born in Woodstock
- Michael Moynihan, journalist
- Nico Muhly, classical music composer
- Dennis Murphy, musician

== N ==
- Andrew Neel, filmmaker
- Leon Nesti, former US Army colonel, surgeon
- Harvey Newcomb, clergyman; born in Thetford
- Angie F. Newman, poet, writer, editor; born in Montpelier
- Clarina I. H. Nichols, public speaker and reformer; born in Townshend
- David H. Nichols, Colorado sheriff, politician; born in Hardwick
- John Humphrey Noyes, socialist; born in Brattleboro

== O ==
- Rachel Oakes Preston, religious leader, born in Vernon
- John O'Brien, filmmaker, born in Tunbridge
- Franklin W. Olin, manufacturer
- Buster Olney, sportswriter, sportscaster; born in Randolph Center
- Darcy Olsen, president of Goldwater Institute
- Ebenezer J. Ormsbee, politician
- Elisha Otis, founder of Otis Elevator Company; born in Halifax

== P ==
- Emily Rebecca Page, poet and editor; born in Bradford
- Morgan Page, music producer
- Grace Paley, poet
- Jay Parini, writer
- Alden Partridge, educator, West Point superintendent
- Katherine Paterson, author of children's books
- Theodore S. Peck, Civil War Medal of Honor recipient
- Moses Pendleton, choreographer
- Joe Perry, lead guitarist for Aerosmith
- Tom Peters, business writer
- Belle L. Pettigrew, educator and missionary; born in Ludlow
- Charles E. Phelps, American Civil War colonel, politician
- John W. Phelps, American Civil War general, presidential candidate
- Hannah Maynard Pickard, teacher, writer; born in Chester
- William Lamb Picknell, 19th-century painter, member of National Academy of Design
- Samuel E. Pingree, American Civil War officer, politician
- Hester M. Poole, writer and social reformer; born in Whiting
- Russell W. Porter, explorer, artist
- Grace Potter, of rock band Grace Potter and the Nocturnals
- Ross Powers, snowboarder, 2002 Olympics gold medalist
- Silas G. Pratt, composer
- Cyrus Pringle, botanist
- Annie Proulx, Pulitzer Prize-winning novelist; lived in Vermont for more than 30 years
- Harvey Putnam, New York politician

== Q ==
- Randy Quaid, actor

== R ==
- Thomas E. G. Ransom, American Civil War general, surveyor
- Edward Rawson, Atlanta businessman; born in Craftsbury
- Edmund Rice, politician; born in Waitsfield
- Henry Mower Rice, Minnesota politician; born in Waitsfield
- Linda Richards, America's first trained nurse; attended St. Johnsbury Academy
- Mark Richards, U.S. congressman; lived in Westminster
- Israel B. Richardson, American Civil War officer
- Benjamin S. Roberts, American Civil War officer
- Edward D. Robie, American Civil War officer
- Moses Robinson, governor of Vermont pre-statehood
- Theodore Robinson, painter
- Norman Rockwell, artist; lived in Arlington
- David McGregor Rogers, Canada politician; born in Londonderry
- Brian Rooney, convicted murderer
- Thomas Rowley, poet
- Homer Elihu Royce, politician, jurist; born in Berkshire
- Carl Ruggles, composer
- Rudolph Ruzicka, typeface designer and engraver

== S ==
- Alvah Sabin, minister, politician; born in Georgia, Vermont
- William James Shaw, entrepreneur
- Truman Henry Safford, mathematics whiz; born in Royalton
- Matt Salinger, actor, son of J.D. Salinger; born in Windsor
- Bernie Sanders, politician, Vermont senator since 2007, former mayor of Burlington (1981–1989), Democratic presidential candidate (2016 and 2020)
- Philetus Sawyer, Wisconsin politician; born in Whiting
- Eric Schaeffer, screenwriter, director, actor
- Helen Bonchek Schneyer, folk musician; died in Vermont
- Stephen Alonzo Schoff, engraver; born in Danville
- Peter Schumann, founder and director of Bread and Puppet Theater
- Arthur E. Scott, photographer; born in Montpelier
- Julian Scott, 19th-century painter and muralist; born in Johnson
- Phil Scott, Vermont politician
- Thomas O. Seaver, American Civil War officer
- Rudolf Serkin, classical pianist; lived in Guilford
- Truman Seymour, American Civil War officer
- Patrick Sharp, Canadian-born hockey player; attended University of Vermont
- L. M. Shaw, governor of Iowa, presidential candidate; born in Morristown
- Patty Sheehan, golfer, winner of 35 LPGA tournaments; born in Middlebury
- Charles H. Sheldon, 19th-century governor of South Dakota; born in Johnson
- George Dallas Sherman, military bandleader
- Josephine E. Sizer, reformer
- Alexander O. Smith, author, Japanese translator
- "Dr. Bob" Smith, co-founder of Alcoholics Anonymous
- Charles Plympton Smith, banker, politician
- David Smith, sculptor; died in South Shaftsbury
- Eva Munson Smith, composter, author, poet; born in Monkton
- Hyrum Smith, religious leader
- J. Gregory Smith, railroad executive, politician
- John Butler Smith, manufacturer, politician
- Joseph Smith, Sr., father of Joseph Smith
- Joseph Smith (1805–1844), founder of Latter Day Saint movement; born in Sharon
- Samuel Harrison Smith, of Latter Day Saints
- William Smith, of Latter Day Saints
- William Farrar Smith, American Civil War officer
- Aleksandr Solzhenitsyn, Russian author, historian; recipient, 1970 Nobel Prize for Literature; lived in Vermont to avoid persecution in Russia; returned to Russia after Perestroika
- Ignat Solzhenitsyn, conductor and pianist
- Ronald I. Spiers, diplomat, ambassador
- Ken Squier, NASCAR commentator and announcer, founder and owner of Thunder Road International Speedbowl in Barre and co-founder of American Canadian Tour racing series; lives in Stowe
- Michael A. Stackpole, science fiction and fantasy author
- Henry Alexander Stafford, baseball player for the New York Giants
- Robert Stafford, namesake of the Stafford Loan
- George J. Stannard, American Civil War general
- Timothy Steele, poet
- Ralph Steiner, photographer, filmmaker
- Rockwell Stephens, writer, ski instructor
- Nettie Stevens, geneticist
- Thaddeus Stevens, 19th-century Pennsylvania politician
- Charles B. Stoughton, American Civil War officer
- Edwin H. Stoughton, American Civil War officer
- F. Stewart Stranahan, American Civil War officer
- George Crockett Strong, American Civil War officer
- William Barstow Strong, railroad president
- Jake Sullivan, government official
- Pete Sutherland, folk musician
- Willis Sweet, Idaho politician; born in Alburgh

== T ==
- Horace Austin Warner Tabor, prospector, one of the "Silver Kings"
- Elisabeth von Trapp, folk singer, guitarist artist and musician
- Alphonso Taft, politician, attorney general, secretary of war under Ulysses S. Grant; born in Townshend
- Louise Taylor, singer-songwriter; born in Brattleboro
- Birdie Tebbetts, baseball player and manager; born in Burlington
- Hannah Teter, snowboarder, 2006 Olympic gold medalist; born in Belmont
- Elswyth Thane, romance novelist; lived in Wilmington
- Harry Bates Thayer, president and chairman of AT&T; educated in Northfield
- John Martin Thomas, university president, Middlebury College
- Stephen Thomas, American Civil War officer
- Tim Thomas, professional hockey player, played for UVM
- Dorothy Thompson, journalist and radio broadcaster
- Ernest Thompson, writer of On Golden Pond; born in Bellows Falls
- John Mellen Thurston, Nebraska senator; born in Montpelier
- George Tooker, painter; lives in Hartland
- Andrew Tracy, politician, born in Hartford
- Joseph Tracy, minister, historian
- Maria von Trapp, stepmother to Von Trapp family singers, The Sound of Music; died in Morrisville
- Tasha Tudor, author of children's books; died in Marlboro
- Fred Tuttle, senatorial candidate, star of film Man with a Plan
- Alexander Twilight, first African American to receive a college degree, and to be elected to public office in the United States
- Royall Tyler, one of the earliest American playwrights
- Dan Tyminski, sang vocals for George Clooney in film O Brother, Where Art Thou?

== U ==
- Don A. J. Upham, Wisconsin politician; born in Weathersfield
- Samuel C. Upham, journalist, counterfeiter

== V ==
- Rudy Vallée, singer and actor; born in Island Pond
- James Van Ness, 19th-century mayor of San Francisco; born in Burlington
- Stewart Van Vliet, American Civil War officer; born in Ferrisburg
- Rick Veitch, comic book artist; raised in Bellows Falls
- William Freeman Vilas, politician; born in Chelsea

== W ==
- M. Emmet Walsh, actor
- James M. Warner, American Civil War general
- Seth Warner, American Revolutionary War officer
- Cephas Washburn, missionary, educator
- Ebenezer Washburn, Canada politician
- Peter T. Washburn, early governor of Vermont
- Lucy H. Washington, poet, social reformer; born in Whiting
- Charles W. Waterman, Colorado senator
- Sterry R. Waterman, judge
- Damon Wayans Jr., actor, born in Huntington
- Henry Wells, businessman, co-founded American Express and Wells Fargo
- Horatio Wells
- Brevet Major General William Wells, awarded Medal of Honor; born in Waterbury
- Mark Whalon, poet and author
- Andrew Wheating, middle-distance track athlete for the University of Oregon, 2008 Olympian
- William Almon Wheeler, vice president of the United States, attended the University of Vermont for two years
- Dora V. Wheelock, activist, writer; born in Calais
- Hilton Wick, politician
- Jody Williams, recipient, 1997 Nobel Peace Prize for efforts to clear away and ban anti-personnel mines
- John Henry Williams, baseball player; son of Ted Williams
- Treat Williams, actor
- Bill W. (Bill Wilson), co-founder of Alcoholics Anonymous
- James Wilson, globe maker
- Helen M. Winslow, journalist, editor, publisher; born in Westfield
- Steve Wisniewski, football player
- Brian Wood, illustrator
- George Woodard, dairy farmer, actor
- Urban A. Woodbury, former Vermont governor
- Edwin T. Woodward, American Civil War officer
- Dean Conant Worcester, zoologist, authority on the Philippines
- Samuel Worcester, missionary
- Jay Wright, poet
- Silas Wright, politician

== Y ==
- Thomas Yamamoto, artist; lived and died in Plainfield
- Brigham Young (1801–1877), second prophet and president of the Church of Jesus Christ of Latter-day Saints; born in Whitingham

== Z ==
- Barry Zorthian, chief spokesperson for U.S. government in Saigon, Vietnam (1964–1968); once worked in St. Johnsbury
- Daphne Zuniga, actress, raised in Reading

== Gallery ==
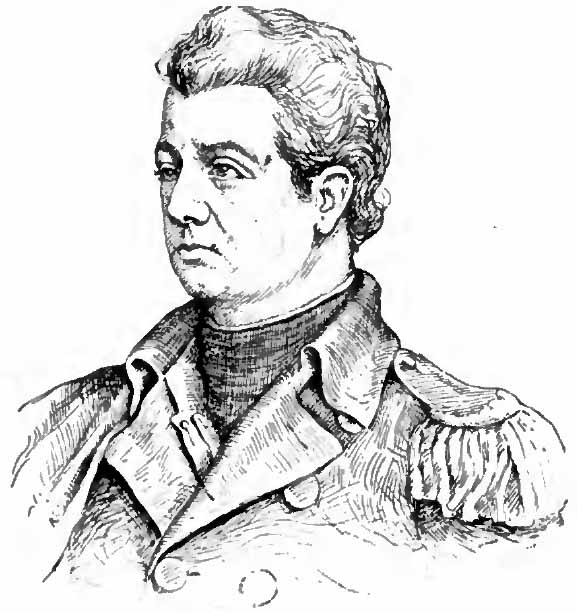
Ethan Allen
(1738–1789), commander of the Green Mountain Boys

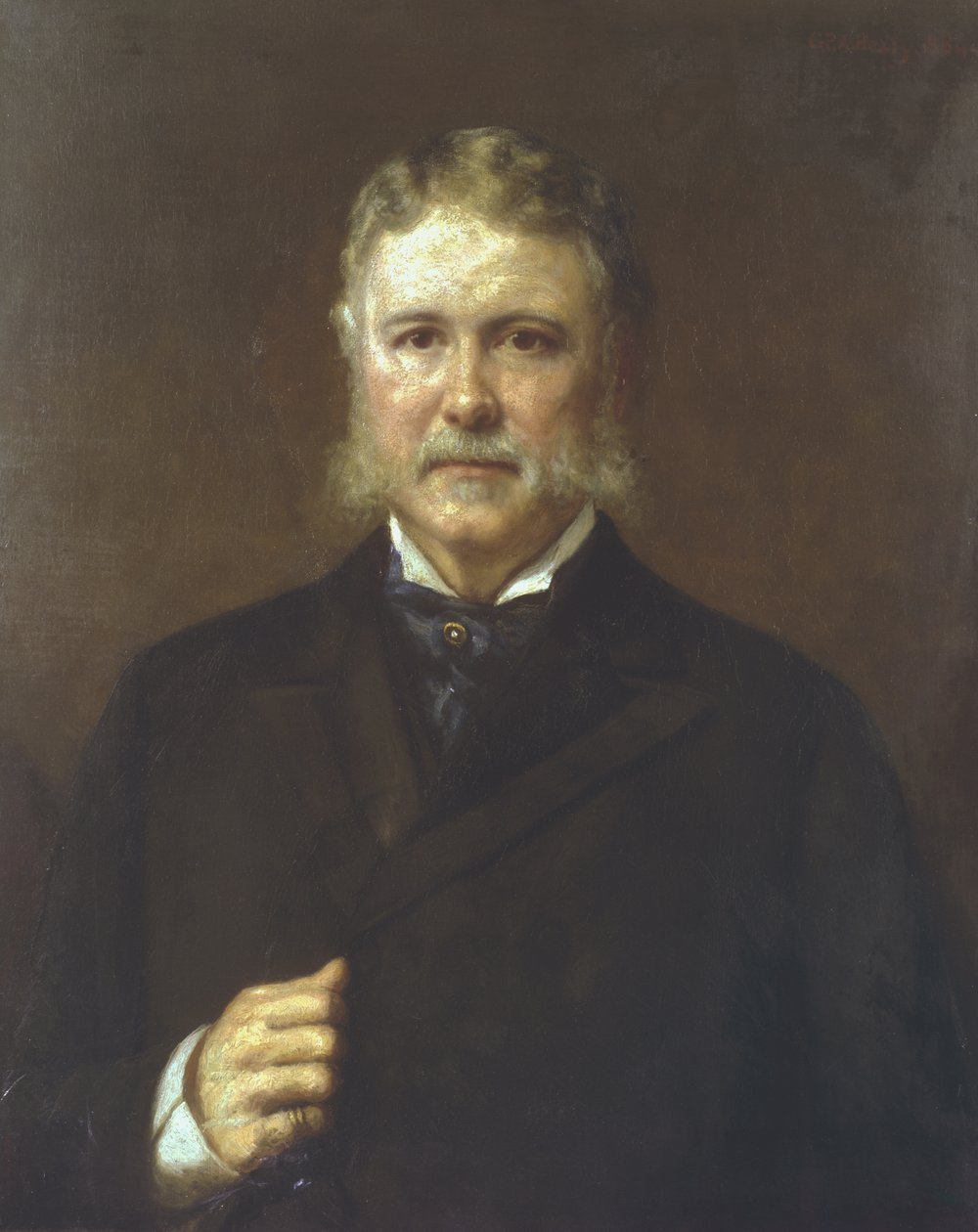
Chester A. Arthur
(1829–1886), 21st president of the United States

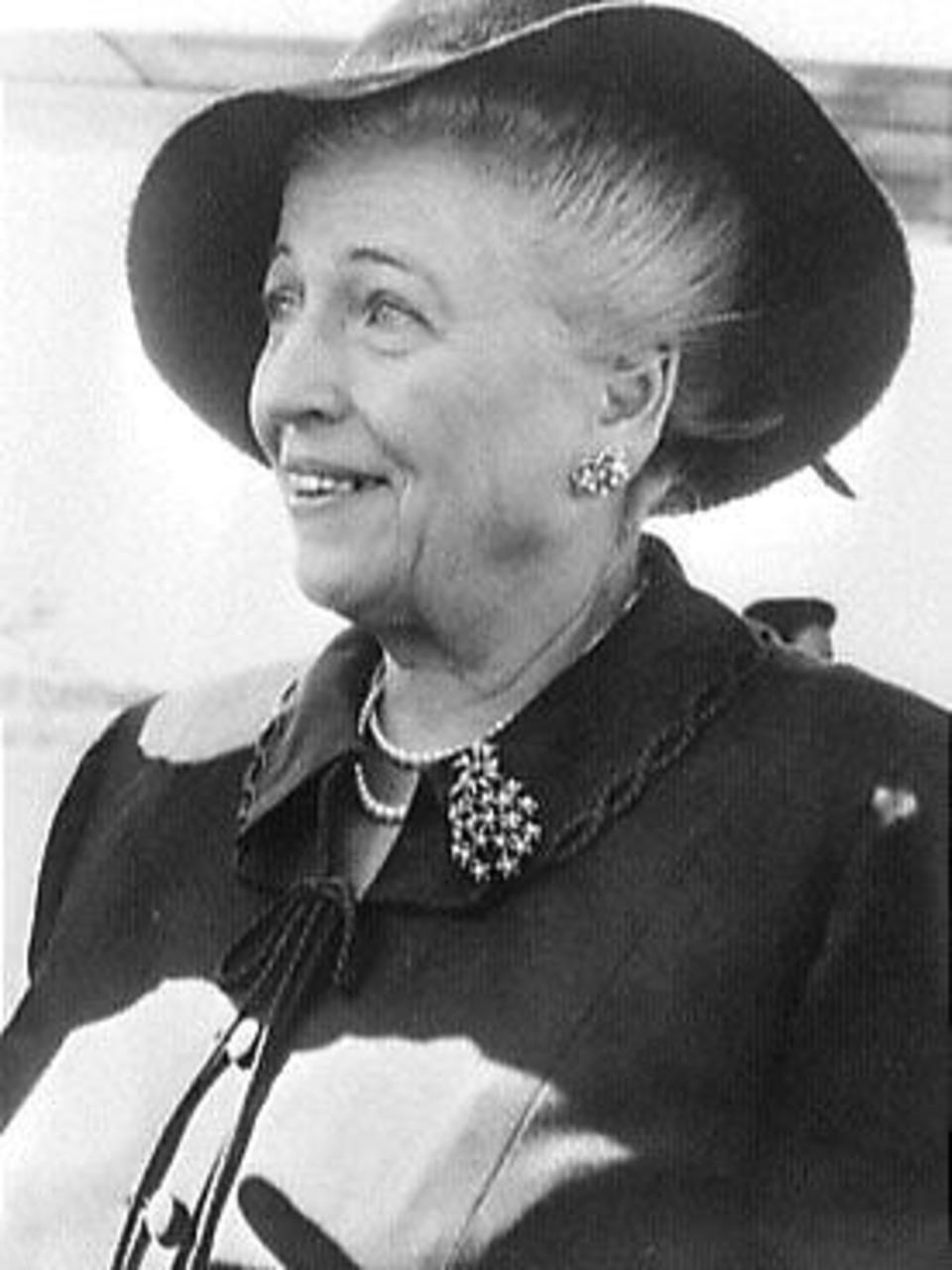
Pearl S. Buck
(1892–1973), first American woman to win the Nobel Prize in Literature

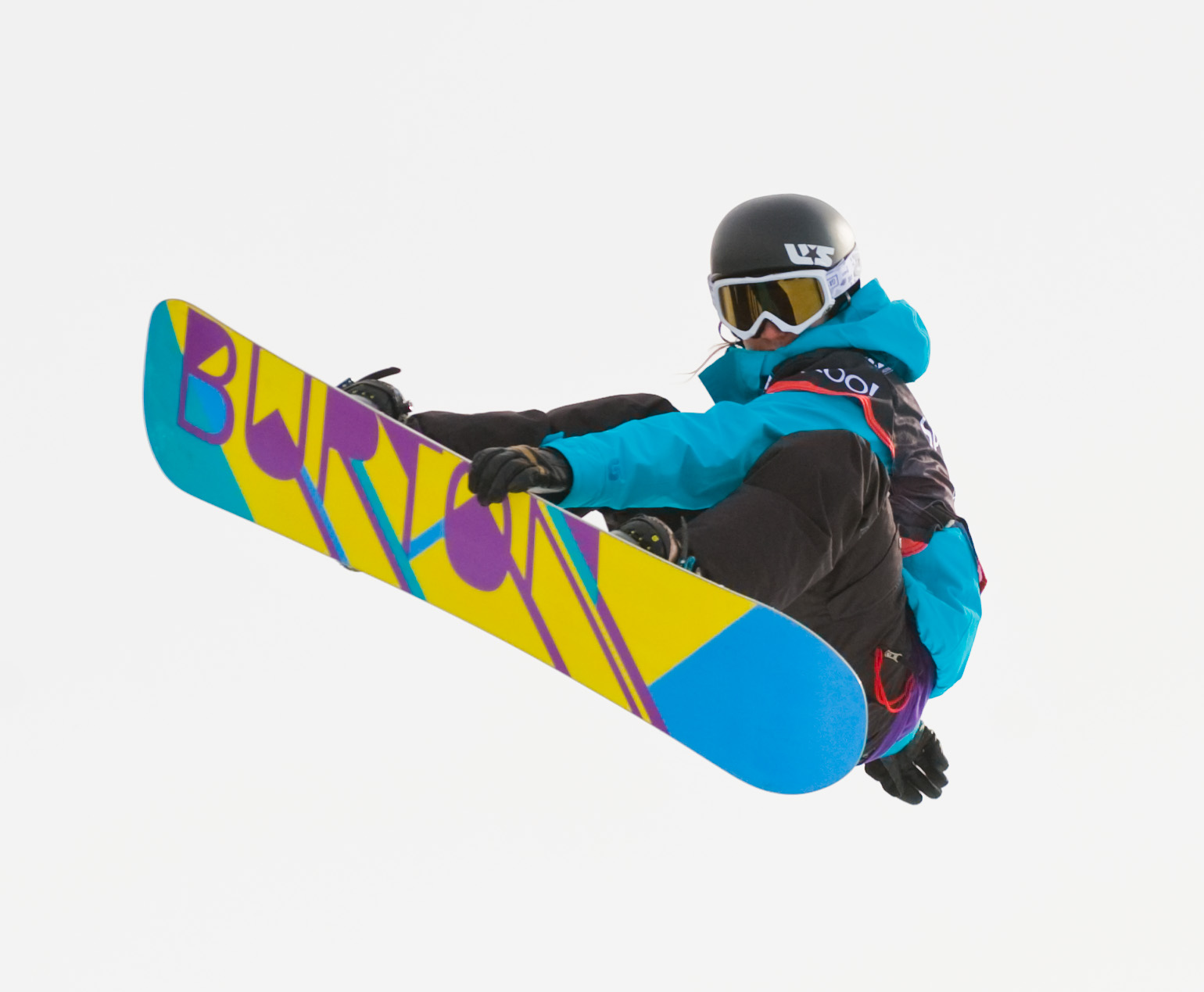
Kelly Clark
(born 1983), snowboarder and gold medalist

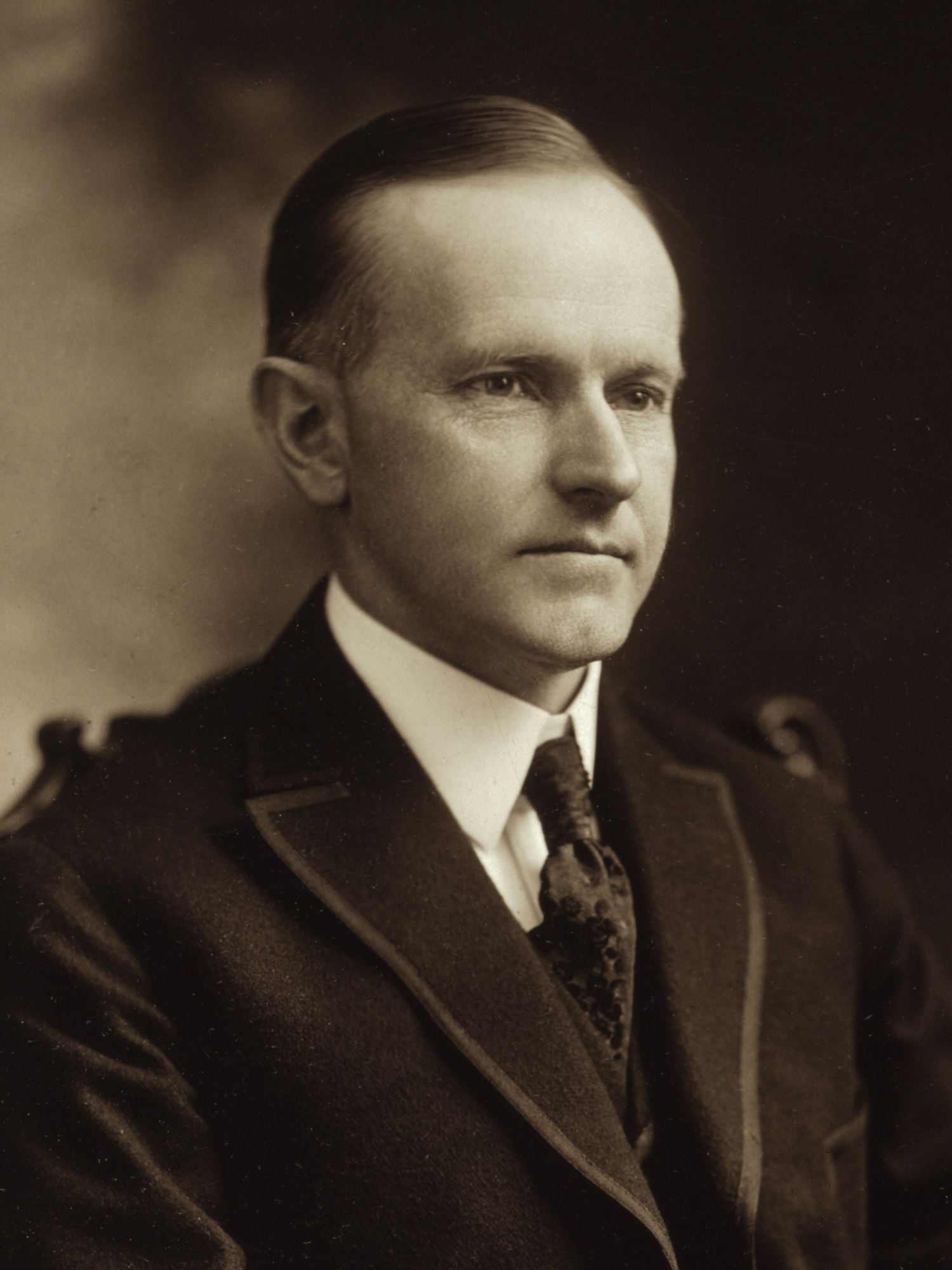
Calvin Coolidge
(1872–1933), 30th president of the United States

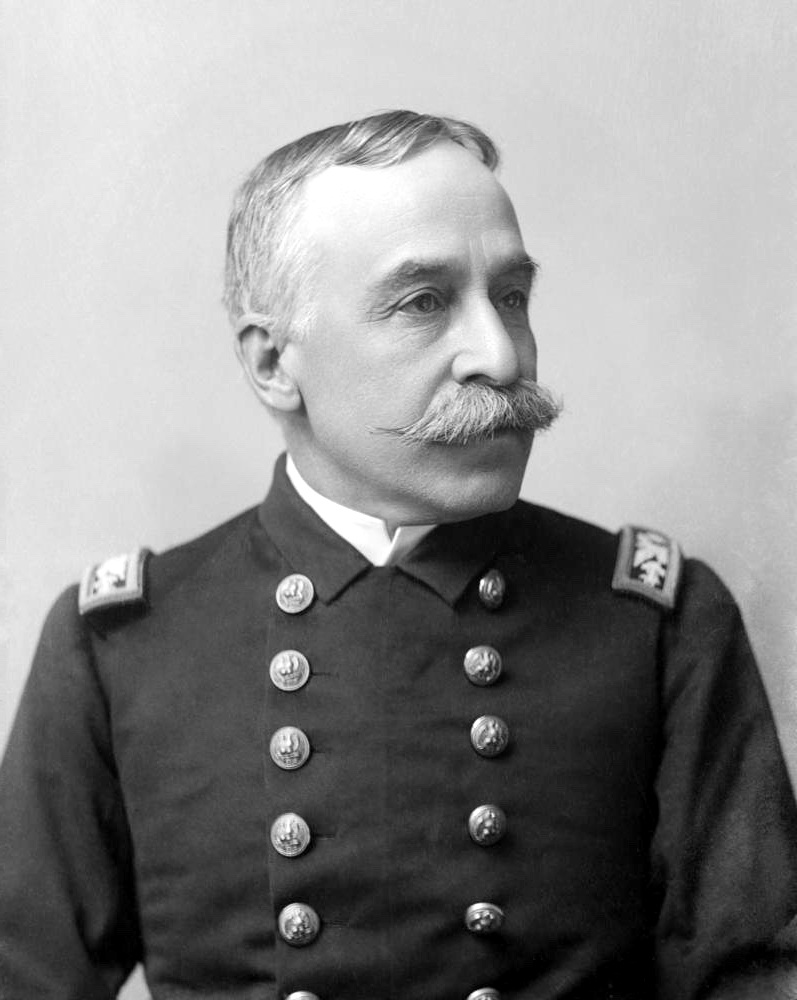
George Dewey
(1837–1917), hero of the 1898 Battle of Manila Bay

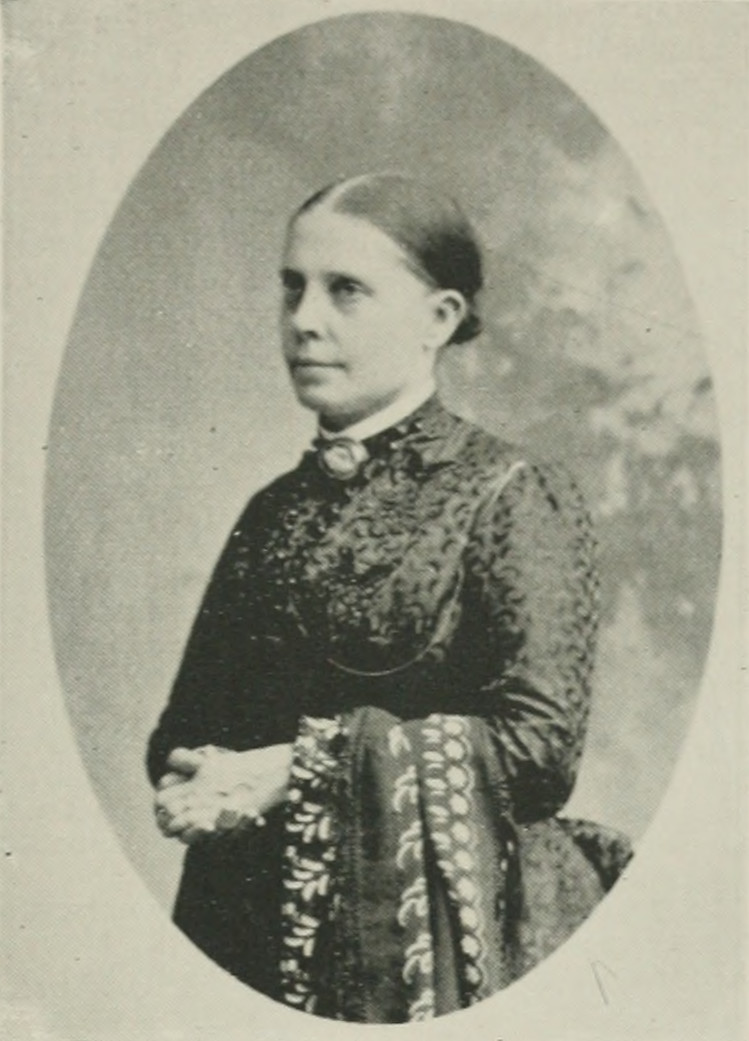
Elmina M. Roys Gavitt
(1828–1898), physician and founder of The Woman's Medical Journal

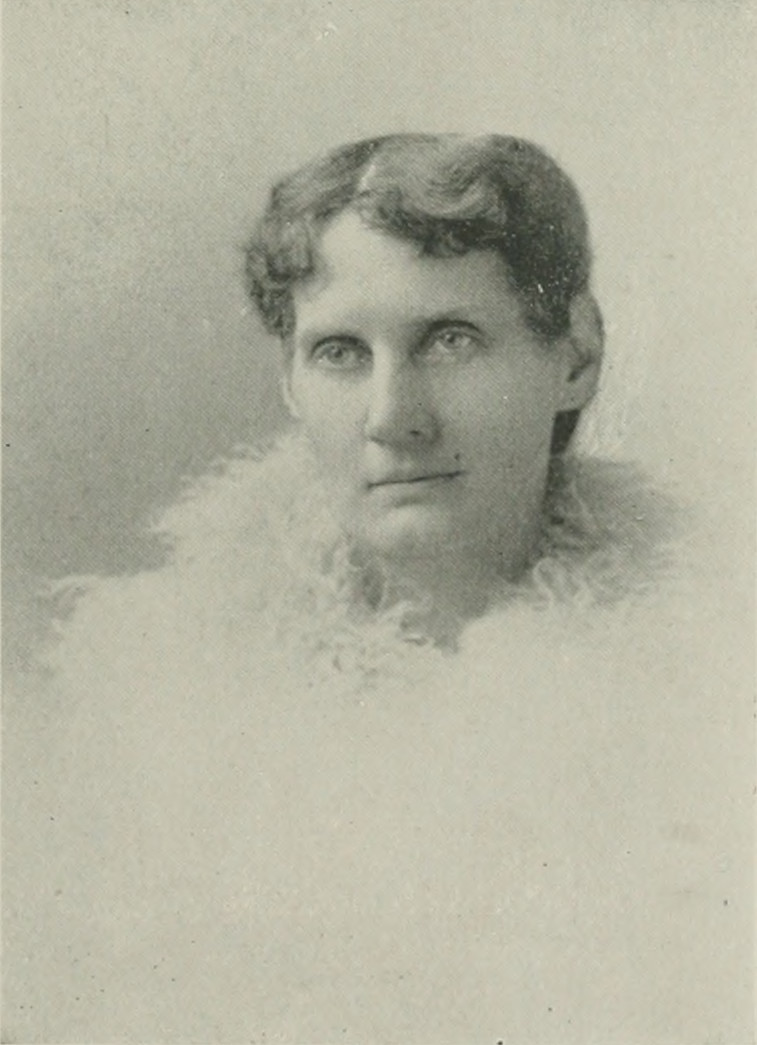
Lucy Mabel Hall-Brown
(1843–1907), physician and writer

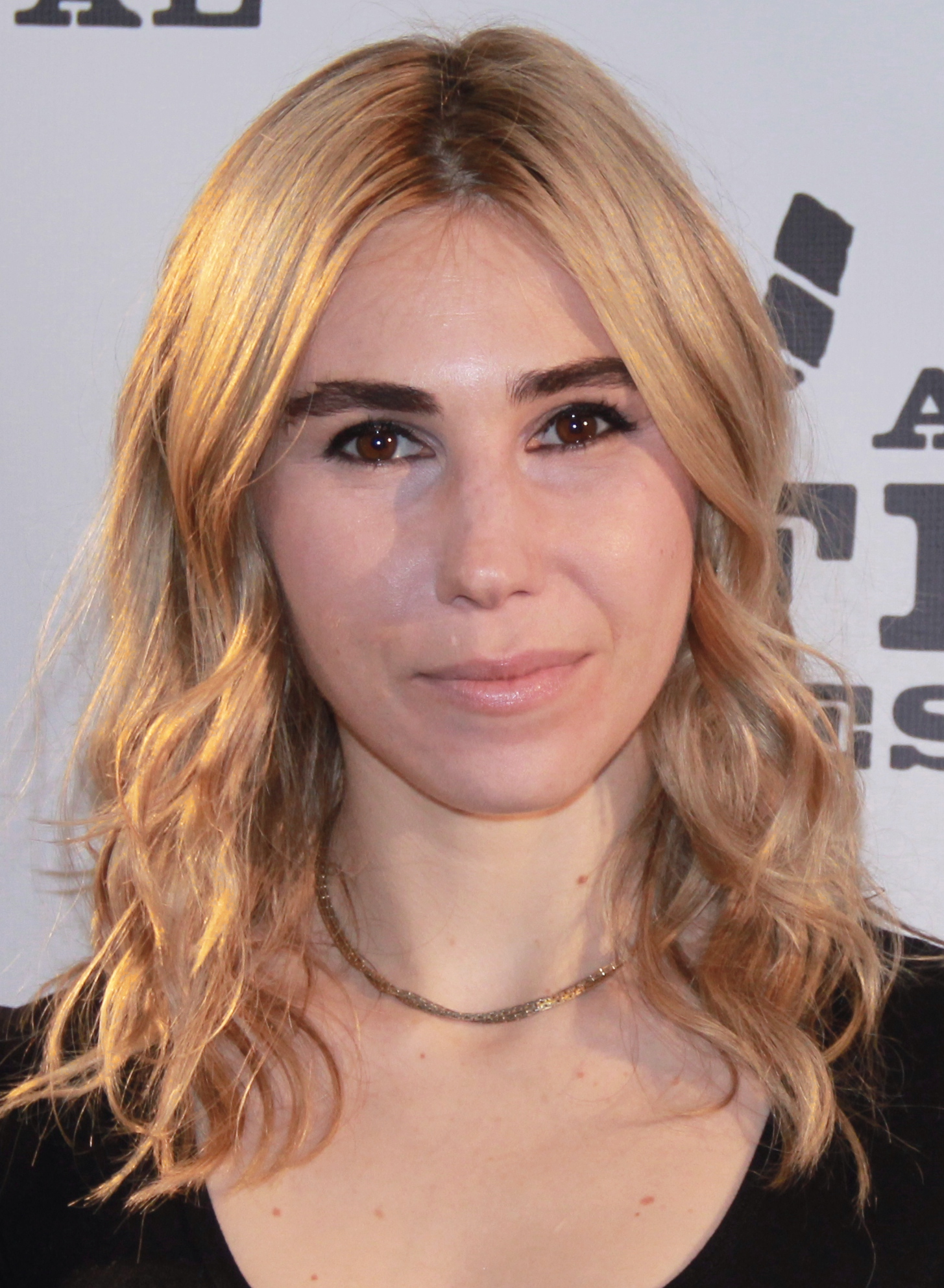
Zosia Mamet
(born 1988), actress and musician

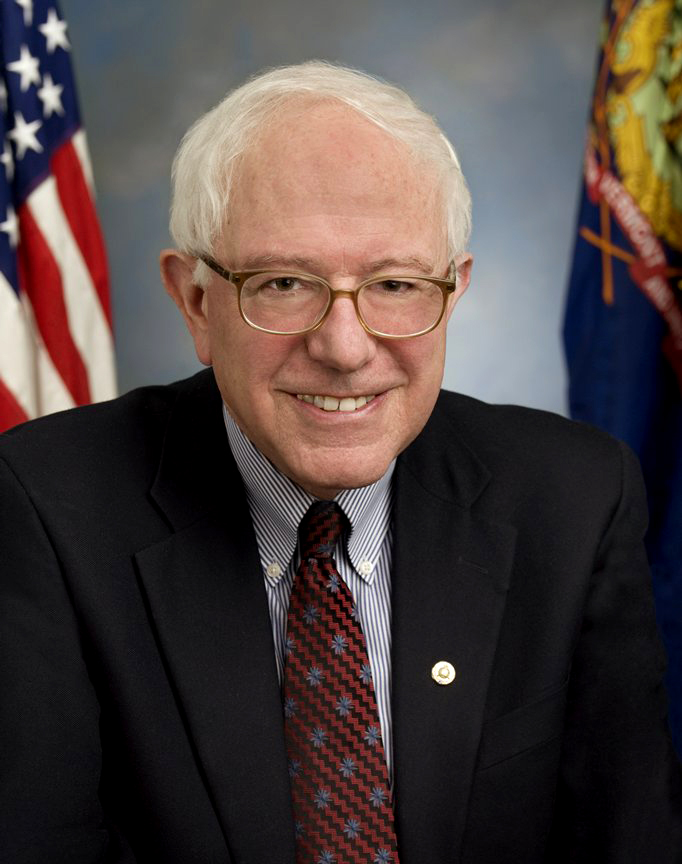
Bernie Sanders
(born 1941), U.S. senator from Vermont and 2016 and 2020 presidential candidate

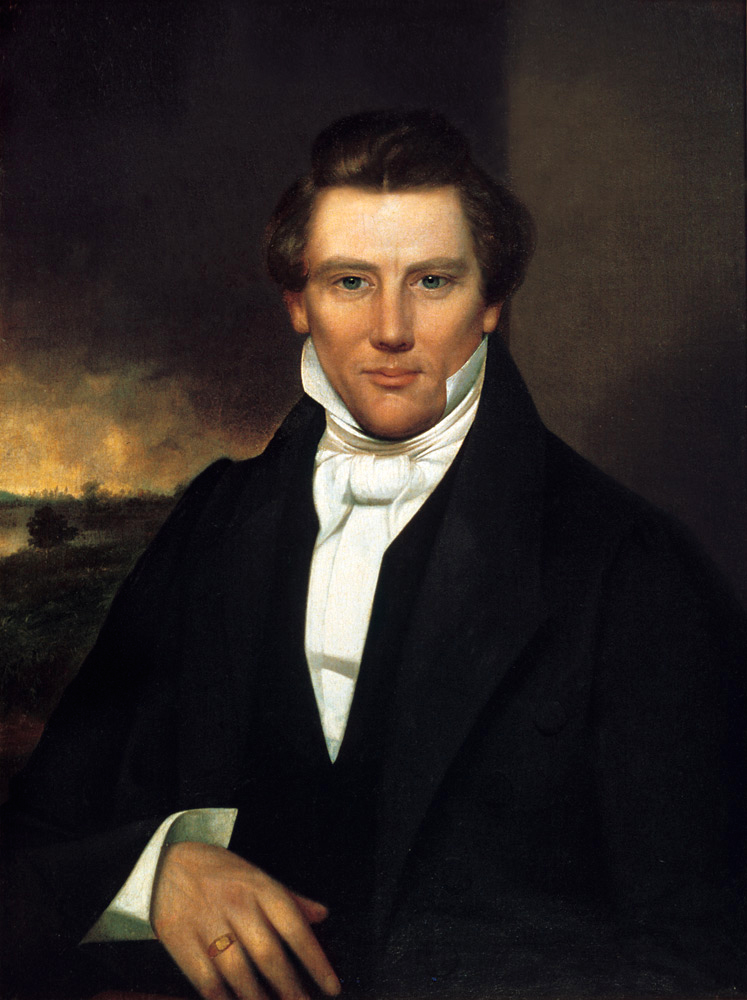
Joseph Smith
(1805–1844), founder of Latter Day Saint movement

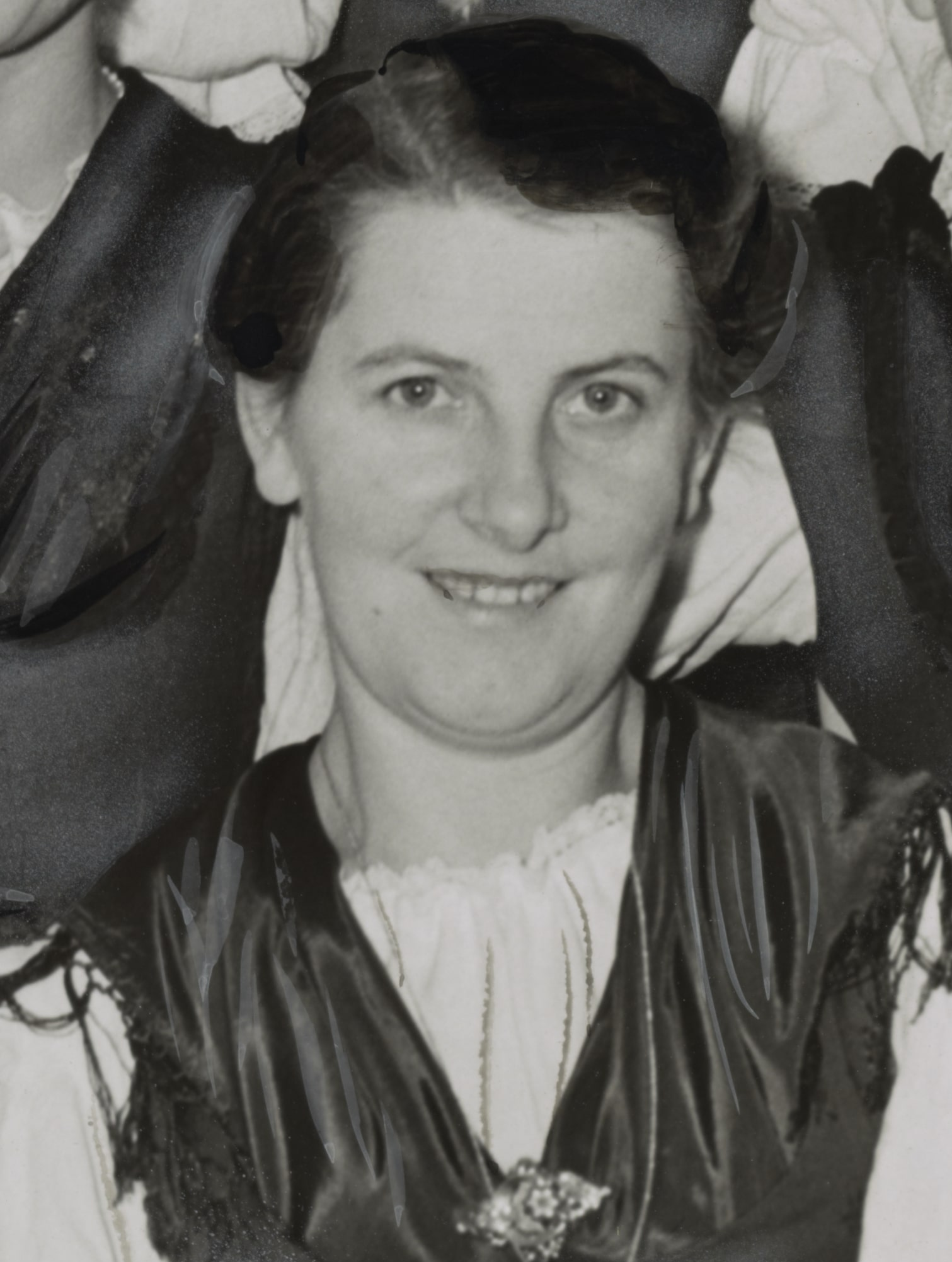
Maria von Trapp
(1905–1987) singer and matriarch of the Trapp Family

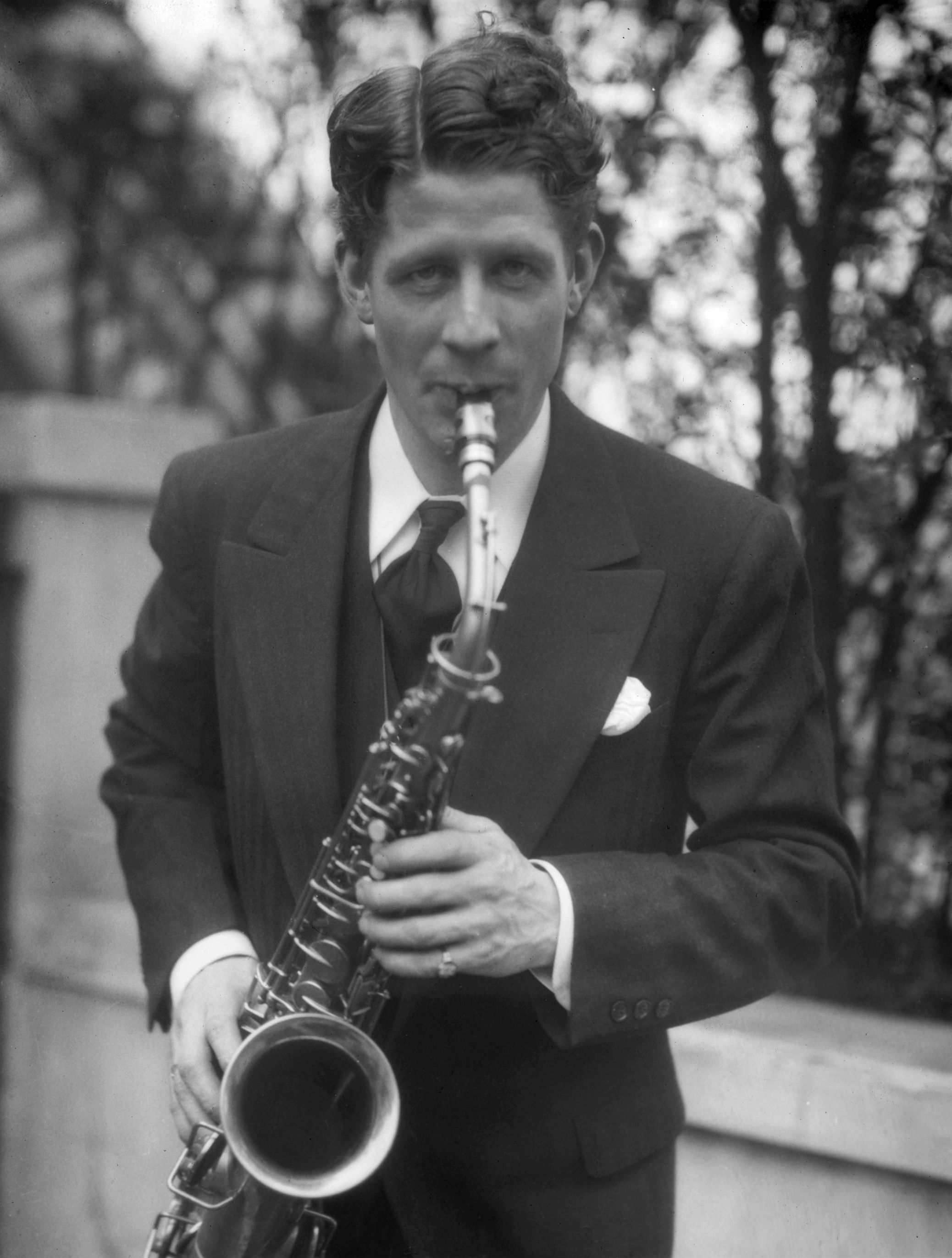
Rudy Vallée
(1901–1986), actor and pop singer

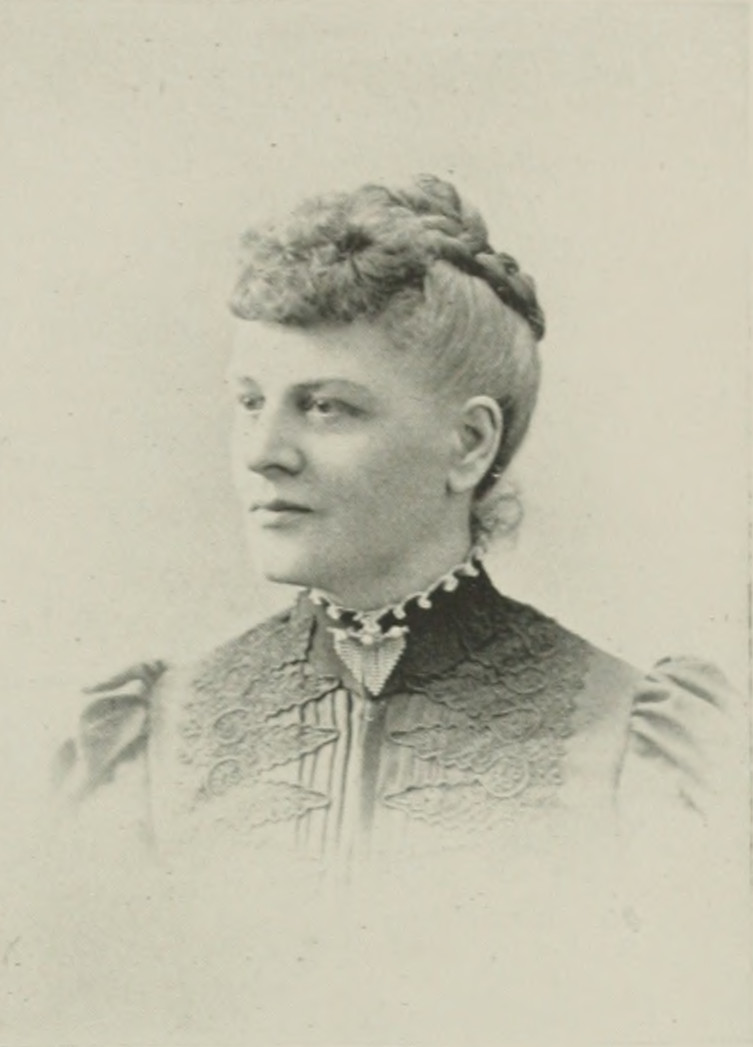
Helen M. Winslow
(1851–1938), author and publisher

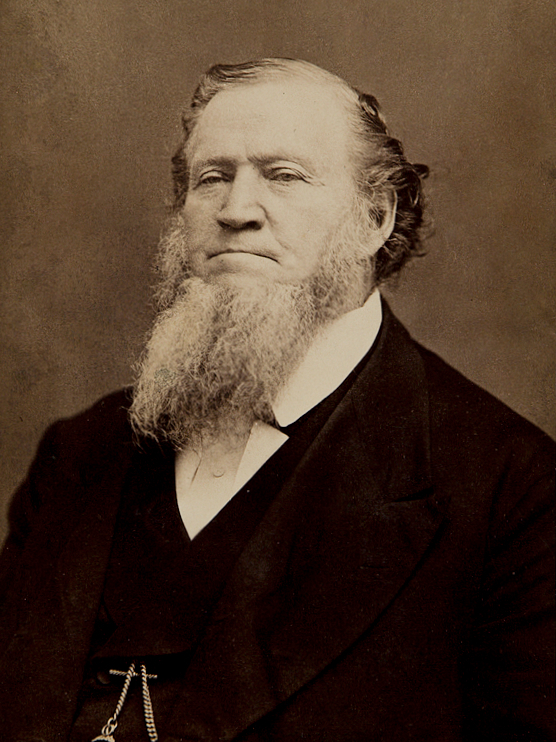
Brigham Young
(1801–1877), Mormon leader and Western settler

== See also ==
- List of Vermont suffragists

By educational institution affiliation

- List of Bennington College people

By governmental office

- List of governors of Vermont
- List of justices of the Vermont Supreme Court
- List of lieutenant governors of Vermont
- List of United States representatives from Vermont
- List of United States senators from Vermont

By location

- List of people from Bennington, Vermont
- List of people from Brattleboro, Vermont
- List of people from Burlington, Vermont
- List of people from Montpelier, Vermont
- List of people from Rutland (city), Vermont
- List of people from St. Albans (city), Vermont
- List of people from St. Johnsbury, Vermont
