= List of people from Brattleboro, Vermont =

The following list includes notable people who were born or have lived in Brattleboro, Vermont.

== Artists and entertainers ==
- Sam Amidon, folk artist
- Tony Barrand, musician
- Saul Bellow, winner of the 1976 Nobel Prize in Literature
- H. H. Bennett, photographer
- Thomas Chubbuck, engraver and designer of the "Brattleboro stamp"
- Douglas Cox, violin maker
- Ely Culbertson, contract bridge player and promoter
- Doveman (real name Thomas Bartlett), musician
- Jacob Estey, reed organ maker
- Karen Hesse, children's author
- Leavitt Hunt, photography pioneer and attorney
- Richard Morris Hunt, architect
- William Morris Hunt, painter
- Wolf Kahn, painter
- Rudyard Kipling, British author, wrote The Jungle Book, Captains Courageous, "Mandalay" and Gunga Din while residing there; later received the Nobel Prize in Literature
- Joanna "JoJo" Levesque, singer and actor
- Ki Longfellow, novelist, playwright and screenwriter
- Leslie William Miller, artistic subject
- Blanche Honegger Moyse, choral conductor
- Marcel Moyse, flute player
- Bing Russell, actor, baseball player and executive, father of Kurt Russell
- Patrick Schneeweis, folk-punk artist
- King Tuff, musician
- Royall Tyler, playwright
- Kit Watkins, musician
- Claude Williamson, musician
- Stu Williamson, musician

=== Bands ===
- Johnny Hobo and the Freight Trains
- Thus Love
- Witch
- Rosenshontz

== Military ==
- Theodore P. Greene, U.S. Navy rear admiral
- George Bradley Kellogg, adjutant general of the Vermont National Guard, lieutenant colonel of the 1st Vermont Cavalry Regiment in the American Civil War
- John W. Phelps, brigadier general in the Union Army during the American Civil War, and later a minor party candidate for president

== Politics ==
- Becca Balint, U.S. congresswoman, president pro tempore of the Vermont Senate
- F. Elliott Barber, Jr., Vermont attorney general
- Herbert G. Barber, Vermont attorney general
- John S. Burgess, lieutenant governor of Vermont
- Arthur P. Carpenter, US marshal for Vermont
- Willard H. Chandler, Wisconsin state senator
- Harrie B. Chase, judge of the United States Court of Appeals for the Second Circuit, brother of Paul A. Chase
- Paul A. Chase, associate justice of the Vermont Supreme Court, brother of Harrie B. Chase
- Ezra Clark, Jr., U.S. congressman
- James Elliot, U.S. congressman
- Clarke C. Fitts, Vermont attorney general
- Levi K. Fuller, 44th governor of Vermont
- Ernest Willard Gibson, U.S. senator
- Ernest W. Gibson Jr., governor of Vermont
- Ernest W. Gibson III, associate justice of the Vermont Supreme Court
- Christian Hansen Jr., U.S. marshal for Vermont and member of the Vermont House of Representatives
- Abram A. Hammond, 12th governor of Indiana
- Broughton Harris, Vermont newspaper editor and businessman; one of the Runaway Officials of 1851 as Secretary of the Utah Territory
- Kittredge Haskins, U.S. congressman
- Mark Higley, Vermont state legislator
- Frederick Holbrook, 27th governor of Vermont
- Frank E. Howe, lieutenant governor of Vermont
- George Howe, state's attorney of Windham County, United States attorney for the District of Vermont, member of the Vermont Senate
- Jonathan Hunt, bank president and congressman
- Daniel Kellogg, U.S. attorney for the District of Vermont and justice of the Vermont Supreme Court
- Samuel Knight, chief justice of the Vermont Supreme Court
- James Loren Martin, judge of the United States District Court for the District of Vermont
- John Humphrey Noyes, utopian socialist, free love advocate, and founder of the Oneida Community
- Samuel E. Perkins, justice of the Indiana Supreme Court
- Harvey Putnam, U.S. congressman
- Peter Shumlin, 81st governor of Vermont
- Micah Townshend, secretary of state of Vermont
- Sharon Treat, member of the Maine House of Representatives and Maine Senate
- James Manning Tyler, U.S. congressman
- Eleazer L. Waterman, judge of the Vermont Superior Court
- Miro Weinberger, mayor of Burlington, Vermont
- Hoyt Henry Wheeler, judge of the United States District Court for the District of Vermont

== Philanthropists ==
- Ida Sherman Jenne (1860–1934), President National of the U.S. Daughters of 1812
- Ronald Read, philanthropist, investor, janitor, and gas station attendant who received media coverage after his death in 2014 due to bequeathing US$1.2 million to Brooks Memorial Library and $4.8 million to Brattleboro Memorial Hospital

== Professionals ==
- Emma Bailey, first American woman auctioneer
- Walter J. Bigelow, editor at the Brattleboro Reformer, former mayor of Burlington, Vermont
- Dr. Charles Chapin, U.S. marshal for Vermont
- Alonzo Church, college president
- William Bullock Clark, geologist
- Donald J. Cram, Nobel laureate in Chemistry, grew up in Brattleboro
- Charles N. Davenport, attorney, Democratic Party leader, founder of the Brattleboro Reformer
- James Fisk, financier
- Charles Christopher Frost, botanist
- Edwin Brant Frost, astronomer
- Ida May Fuller, first recipient of Social Security check
- John Holbrook, publisher and businessman
- Richard Morris Hunt, architect
- Leif K-Brooks, computer programmer and web designer
- William Rutherford Mead, architect
- James L. Oakes, judge
- Herbert Reiner Jr., diplomat
- Samuel Stearns, astronomer and doctor
- William Willard, school founder
- Jody Williams, teacher, aid worker, anti-land mines activist, and Nobel laureate

== Sports ==
- Brad Baker, minor league baseball player
- Chris Duffy, center fielder and first baseman for the Pittsburgh Pirates, Milwaukee Brewers, and Philadelphia Phillies
- James Galanes, Olympic cross-country skier
- Ernie Johnson, pitcher for the Boston Braves/Milwaukee Braves and Baltimore Orioles
- Bill Koch, cross-country skier, Olympic silver medalist, World championship bronze medalist, World cup winner
- George Schildmiller, college baseball, basketball, and football player and college football coach
- Joe Shield, quarterback for the Green Bay Packers
