= List of people from Rutland (city), Vermont =

The following list includes notable people who were born or have lived in Rutland, Vermont, United States.

== Academics and writing ==
- Julia C. R. Dorr, author; resident of Rutland
- Joy Hakim, history writer
- Mary McGarry Morris, novelist
- John Martin Thomas, ninth president of Middlebury College, ninth president of Penn State, and twelfth president of Rutgers University; resident of Rutland
- Charles E. Tuttle, publisher

== Business ==
- James E. Burke, CEO of Johnson & Johnson
- John Deere, industrialist
- George E. Royce, pioneer of marble quarrying industry, state senator

== Military ==
- Francis William Billado, Major General and Adjutant General of the Vermont National Guard
- Barry M. Costello, US Navy vice admiral
- Merritt A. Edson, US Marine Corps major general
- Frederic Williams Hopkins, Adjutant General of the Vermont National Guard, 1837–1852
- Daniel Murray, Loyalist Major for the British during the American Revolutionary War
- Edward H. Ripley, American Civil War Brevet Brigadier General, brother of William Y. W. Ripley
- William Y. W. Ripley, American Civil War recipient of the Medal of Honor
- Leonard F. Wing, National Guard major general who commanded the 43rd Infantry Division in World War II
- John E. Woodward, U.S. Army brigadier general

== Music ==
- Aaron Lewis, lead guitarist and founding member of Staind
- Dan Tyminski, bluegrass composer, vocalist and instrumentalist

== Politics ==
- Horace W. Bailey, U.S. Marshal for Vermont
- Edward L. Burke, U.S. Marshal for Vermont
- Fred M. Butler, Associate Justice of the Vermont Supreme Court
- Frank H. Chapman, U.S. Marshal for Vermont
- Percival W. Clement, 57th Governor of Vermont
- Thomas W. Costello, state representative
- Walter C. Dunton, Justice of the Vermont Supreme Court
- Fred A. Field, U.S. Marshal for Vermont
- Henry F. Field, Vermont State Treasurer
- George Tisdale Hodges, U.S. congressman
- Steven Howard, state representative
- William Brown Ide (1796–1852), state legislator, central figure in California's Bear Flag Revolt of 1846, named President of the Republic of California
- Jim Jeffords, U.S. senator
- Olin M. Jeffords, Chief Justice of the Vermont Supreme Court, father of Senator Jim Jeffords
- Lawrence C. Jones, Vermont Attorney General
- Charles Linsley, Vermont attorney and politician
- Kevin J. Mullin, member of the Vermont House of Representatives and Vermont Senate
- John Prout, Justice of the Vermont Supreme Court
- Joseph F. Radigan, United States Attorney for Vermont
- Lyman W. Redington (1849–1925), attorney, member of the Vermont House of Representatives and New York State Assembly
- Israel Smith (1759–1810), member of the United States House of Representatives; member of the United States Senate; Governor of Vermont; resident of Rutland
- Milford K. Smith, Associate Justice of the Vermont Supreme Court
- Bert L. Stafford, mayor of Rutland
- Robert Stafford, U.S. congressman and senator; 71st Governor of Vermont
- Richard C. Thomas, Secretary of State of Vermont
- Charles K. Williams, Chief Justice of the Vermont Supreme Court 1834–1846; Governor of Vermont 1850–1852; raised in Rutland

== Sports ==
- Rick Chaffee, Olympic ski racer
- Suzy Chaffee, Olympic ski racer and actress
- Andrea Mead Lawrence, first American to win two Olympic gold medals in skiing
- Arlie Pond, pitcher for the Baltimore Orioles
- Steve Wisniewski, guard and assistant offensive line coach for the Los Angeles/Oakland Raiders

== Television and film ==
- David Franzoni, Oscar-winning writer and producer of film Gladiator
- David Giancola, filmmaker; born in Rutland
- Carlene King Johnson, Miss Vermont USA 1955, Miss USA 1955

== Fictional residents ==
- Fitzgerald Thomas Grant III, President of the United States on the TV series Scandal; has a house in Rutland
- Master Pandemonium, comic book villain
- Snow Job, character from G.I. Joe
