= 2008 Vermont lieutenant gubernatorial election =

- November 4, 2008
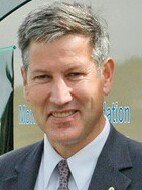

Nominee	Brian Dubie	Thomas W. Costello
Party	Republican	Democratic
Popular vote	171,744	121,953
Percentage	55.08%	39.11%
- County results Dubie: 50–60% 60–70% Costello: 40–50% 60–70%
Lieutenant Governor before election
Brian Dubie
Republican
Elected Lieutenant Governor
Brian Dubie
Republican

The 2008 Vermont lieutenant gubernatorial election was held on November 4, 2008, to elect the lieutenant governor of Vermont. Republican incumbent Brian Dubie won re-election to a fourth two-year term in office, defeating Democratic former Vermont state representative Thomas W. Costello by fifteen percentage points.

== Republican primary ==
=== Candidates ===
- Brian Dubie, incumbent lieutenant governor of Vermont (2003–2011)

=== Results ===
Republican primary results
Party	Candidate	Votes	%
Republican	Brian Dubie	11,436	99.33%
Write-in		85	0.67%
Total votes		11,521	100.00%

== Democratic primary ==
=== Candidates ===
- Thomas W. Costello, former Vermont state representative for Brattleboro (1994–2000)
- Nathan Freeman, businessman

=== Results ===
Democratic primary results
Party	Candidate	Votes	%
Democratic	Thomas W. Costello	11,866	61.94%
Democratic	Nathan Freeman	6,676	34.85%
Write-in		614	3.21%
Total votes		19,156	100.00%

== General election ==
=== Candidates ===
- Brian Dubie, incumbent lieutenant governor of Vermont (2003–2011) (Republican)
- Thomas W. Costello, former Vermont state representative for Brattleboro (1994–2000) (Democratic)
- Richard Kemp, activist and former Burlington city councilor (Progressive)
- Ben Mitchell, activist and perennial candidate (Liberty Union)

=== Results ===
2008 Vermont lieutenant gubernatorial election results
Party	Candidate	Votes	%	±%
Republican	Brian Dubie	171,744	55.08%	+3.91%
Democratic	Thomas W. Costello	121,953	39.11%	−6.36%
Progressive	Richard Kemp	14,249	4.57%	+2.40%
Liberty Union	Ben Mitchell	3,639	1.17	+0.02%
Write-in		207	0.07	+0.03%
Total votes		260,430	100.00%	
Republican hold				
