= List of people from St. Albans (city), Vermont =

The following list includes notable people who were born or have lived in the U.S. city of St. Albans, Vermont.

== Artists and authors ==
- Arthur Scott Bailey, children's author
- Paul Blackburn, poet
- Ezra Brainerd, college professor
- Abbott Lowell Cummings, architectural historian and genealogist
- Alfred Dudley Turner, composer
- Winston Freer, magician
- Frances Frost, poet
- Chantal Joffe, artist
- Rod Loomis, actor
- Dan Parent, comic book writer and artist
- Ann Eliza Smith, writer
- Lucy Langdon Wilson, educator and ethnographer

== Business ==
- Louis Sherry, restaurateur and hotelier
- George J. Stannard, farmer, foundry operator and major general
- William Shepard Wetmore, merchant

== Military ==
- William Beaumont, US Army physician
- Edward J. O'Neill, US Army lieutenant general
- William Farrar Smith, Union Army engineer and major general
- Lee Stephen Tillotson, Adjutant General of the Vermont National Guard
- William Tilton (1834–1910), born in St. Albans, Medal of Honor recipient in the American Civil War

== Outlaws ==
- Richard M. Brewer, cowboy and outlaw
- Sile Doty, robber and horse thief

== Politicians ==
- Asa Aldis, Chief Justice of the Vermont Supreme Court
- Asa O. Aldis, Associate Justice of the Vermont Supreme Court
- Warren Austin, US senator and ambassador
- Bradley Barlow, US congressman
- Herman R. Beardsley, Justice of the Vermont Supreme Court
- Jeptha Bradley, Vermont Auditor of Accounts
- Lawrence Brainerd, businessman, abolitionist and US senator
- Elbert S. Brigham, US congressman
- Josiah Sandford Brigham, physician and Canadian politician
- Stephen S. Cushing, Associate Justice of the Vermont Supreme Court
- David Glidden, chair of the Vermont Democratic Party
- Frank L. Greene, US congressman and senator
- Edward Chester Plow, soldier and the 22nd Lieutenant Governor of Nova Scotia
- Percival L. Shangraw, Chief Justice of the Vermont Supreme Court
- J. Gregory Smith, 28th governor of Vermont
- John Smith, US congressman
- Worthington Curtis Smith, US congressman
- Hiram F. Stevens, lawyer, state senator and congressman from Minnesota
- William Strong, judge
- Benjamin Swift, US congressman and senator
- Harold C. Sylvester, Saint Albans City Attorney, Alderman, and member of the Vermont House of Representatives; Judge of the Vermont Superior Court and Associate Justice of the Vermont Supreme Court
- Jeff Weaver, political adviser and campaign manager for Bernie Sanders; 1987 alderman candidate and 1990 mayoral candidate
- Solomon Lewis Withey, federal judge

== Sports ==
- John LeClair, left winger for the Montreal Canadiens, Philadelphia Flyers, and Pittsburgh Penguins
