= National Auctioneers Association =

American advocacy group representing auctioneers

The National Auction Association (NAA), founded in 1949, is an advocacy group representing auctioneers, auction businesses and related companies that seeks to promote the auction method of marketing and the practice of auctioneering in the United States. Its headquarters is located at 8880 Ballentine, Overland Park, Kansas, 66214, USA. Prior to July 2023, this non-profit was known as the National Auctioneers Association. A change was made to represent the vast auction network of professionals.

== History ==
In 1952, Emma Bailey became the first woman auctioneer admitted to the Association.

== Membership ==
The NAA states that membership is at or around 4000 members from the United States, Canada, Australia, China, Czech Slovak, Great Britain, India, Ireland, New Zealand, South Africa, the Virgin Islands South, and West Africa. Membership is open to anyone worldwide who is involved in marketing through competitive bidding or the auction method of marketing. Members pay dues and follow the NAA Code of Ethics.

The NAA is primarily an educational group. Members of NAA Educational Trustees work with NAA staff, Board of Directors, and Executive Committee to produce educational opportunities for the membership. NAA classes and designations include Accredited Auctioneer of Real Estate (AARE), Graduate Personal Property Appraiser (GPPA), Master Personal Property Appraiser (MPPA), Certified Estate Specialist (CES), Auction Technology Specialist (ATS), Benefit Auctioneer Specialist (BAS), and the Certified Auctioneer Institute (CAI) the most revered professional designation an Auctioneer can acquire. The NAA offers these designation classes to its members and non-members alike at designation academies, and at its annual Conference and Show. The NAA also conducts seminars, and summits to educate its members.

The NAA conducts various contests at the Conference and Show including a marketing competition, and the International Auctioneer Championship (IAC). The NAA makes speakers available to state associations to educate their members on auction topics.
