= Leon Nesti =

United States Army lieutenant colonel (born 1972)

Leon J. Nesti
- Born: Vermont, U.S.
- Alma mater: United States Military Academy; Thomas Jefferson University and Jefferson Medical College; Walter Reed Army Medical Center; Curtis National Hand Center
- Military career
- Allegiance: United States of America
- Branch: United States Army
- Service years: 1992–2022
- Rank: Colonel

Leon J. Nesti (born 1972) is a retired United States Army Colonel who served as the Chief of Clinical and Experimental Orthopedics Laboratory at the Uniformed Services University of the Health Sciences. He was a hand and upper extremity reconstructive surgeon at Walter Reed National Military Medical Center and performed duties as the Co-Surgical Chief of the Walter Reed Peripheral Nerve Clinic and the Upper Extremity Consultant for the United States Military Academy and its athletic teams. He was also the Director of the combined Walter Reed / Curtis National Hand Center fellowship program. He now practices at the Annapolis Hand Center in Annapolis, Maryland.

== Early life and education ==
Nesti was born in Vermont. After graduating from Rice Memorial High School in South Burlington, he attended Carleton College for one year before transferring to the United States Military Academy at West Point, New York, and was commissioned a second lieutenant. He then obtained his MD/PhD in 2002 through the clinician-scientist training program at Thomas Jefferson University and Jefferson Medical College in Philadelphia.

== Career ==
Nesti completed his internship and residency in orthopaedic surgery at Walter Reed Army Medical Center in Washington, D.C., from 2002 to 2008, followed by a fellowship in hand surgery at the combined Army Hand and Upper Extremity Reconstructive Surgery Fellowship at Walter Reed and the Curtis National Hand Center in Baltimore, Maryland. He is certified by the American Board of Orthopaedic Surgeons. His military education includes completion of the AMEDD Officer Basic Course, Combat Casualty Care Course, and Combat Extremity Surgery Course.

Dr. Nesti served as the Chief of the Orthopaedic Research Group at the National Institutes of Health/National Institute of Arthritis and Musculoskeletal and Skin Diseases and as the Chief of Clinical and Experimental Orthopedics Laboratory at the Uniformed Services University of the Health Sciences. He was a Hand and Upper Extremity Reconstructive surgeon at Walter Reed National Military Medical Center and performed duties as the Co-Surgical Chief of the Walter Reed Peripheral Nerve Clinic and the Upper Extremity consultant for the United States Military Academy and its athletic teams. He was also the Director of the combined Walter Reed / Curtis National Hand Center fellowship program.

== Research ==
Dr. Nesti's clinical and scientific interests are focused on progenitor cell function in musculoskeletal disease and regeneration.

== Awards and decorations ==
Superior Unit Award
National Defense Service Medal
Global War on Terrorism Service Medal
Army Service Ribbon
Overseas Service Ribbon
