= Edwin T. Woodward =

US Navy officer (1843-1894)

Commander Edwin T. Woodward
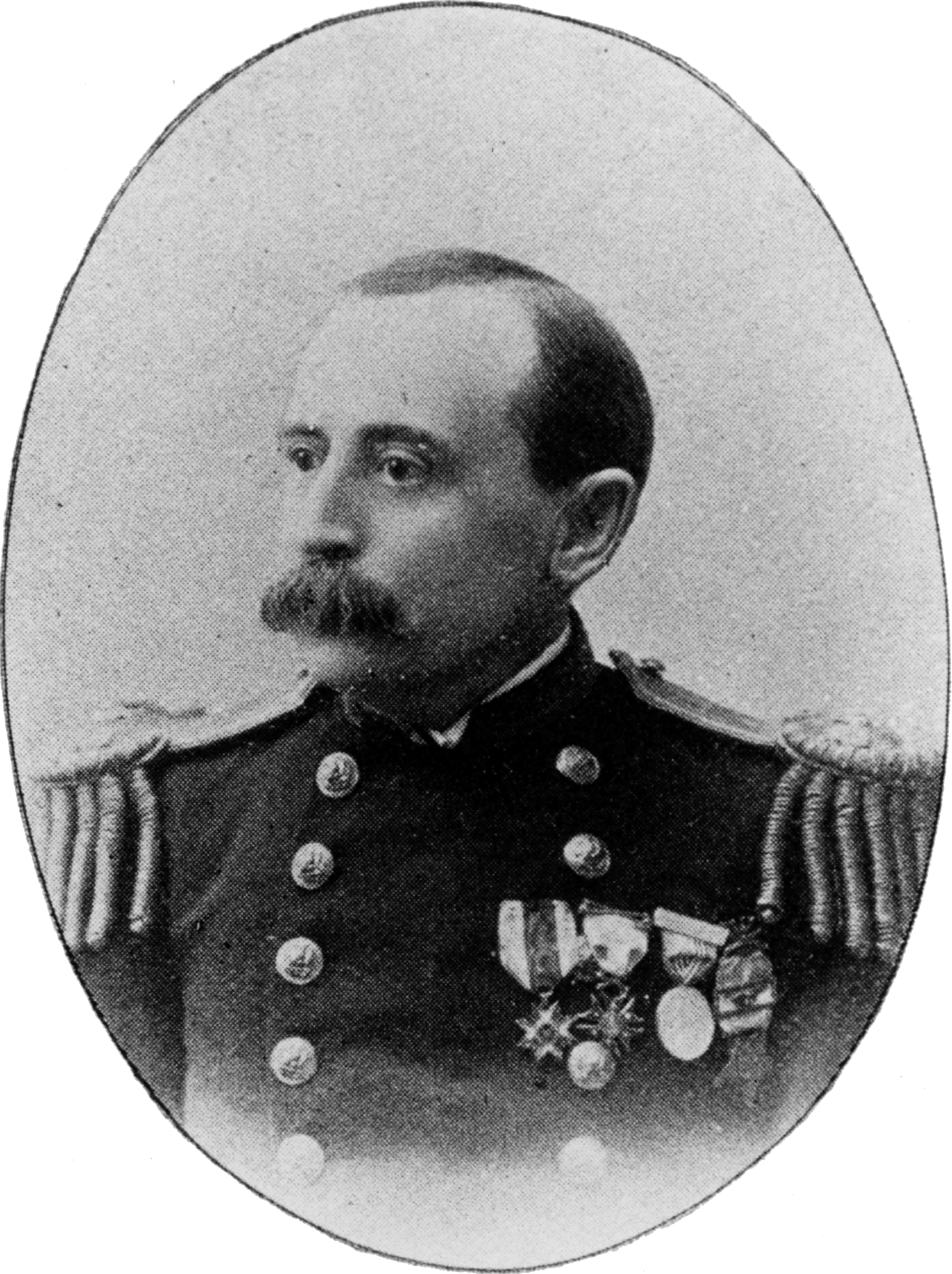
- Born: Edwin Tully Woodward; March 8, 1843; Castleton, Vermont
- Died: February 22, 1894 (aged 50); Saratoga Springs, New York
- Military career
- Allegiance: United States
- Branch: United States Navy
- Service years: 1859–1893
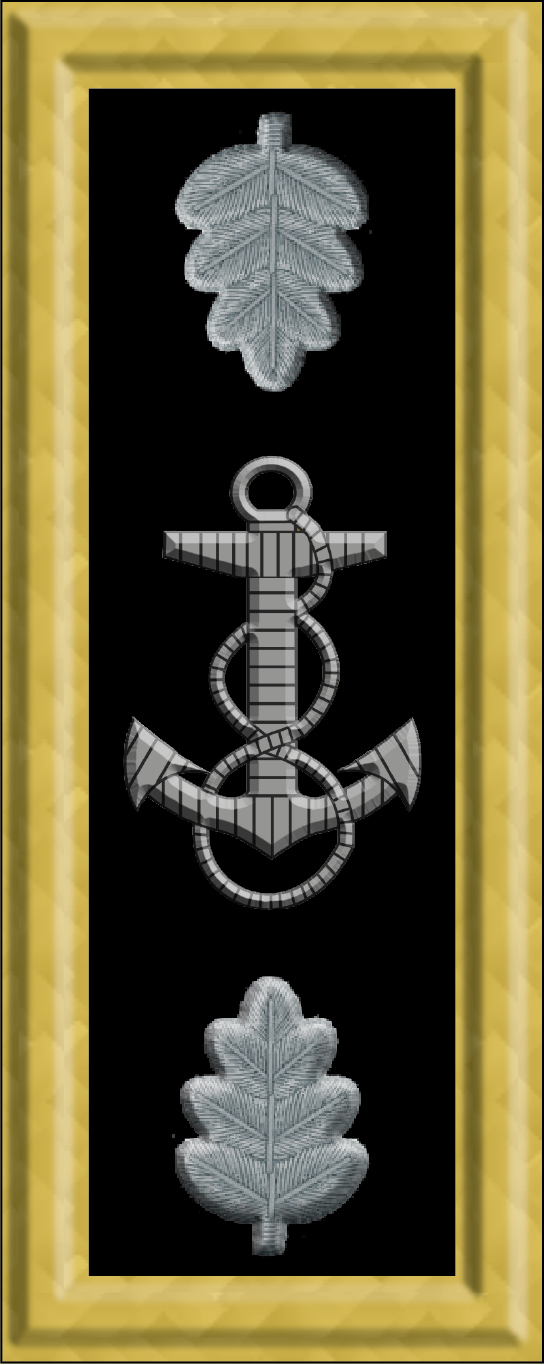
- Rank: Commander
- Commands: USS Yantic; USS Swatara; USS Terror; USS Adams
- Conflicts: American Civil War

Edwin T. Woodward (March 8, 1843 – February 22, 1894), was a naval officer during and after the American Civil War.

== Civil War ==
Woodward was born in Castleton, Vermont, the son of Edwin C. and Charlotte (Barney) Woodward. He received an appointment to the United States Naval Academy and began his studies there on November 21, 1859. One of several whose academy careers were foreshortened by the war, he served on the sloop Mississippi, the garrison ship Island and the gunboat Sciota in the Gulf Blockading Squadrons, including two attacks on and passage of the Confederate batteries at Vicksburg in 1861 and 1862.

In late December 1861, Woodward was part of the prize-crew of the captured Confederate steamer Henry Lewis, off Ship Island, Mississippi, when he commanded one of two small boat that went ashore and captured a Confederate battery, "which was done as expeditiously as possible and without molestation."

While on the Sciota off New Orleans, in April 1862, he was commended by Fleet Captain Henry H. Bell, for "gallantly working the rifle on the topgallant forecastle."

He then served on the sloop Cyane in the Pacific Squadron in 1863, and participated in the capture of the Rebel privateer J. M. Chapman on March 15, in San Francisco harbor. Woodward apparently spent little time at sea during this tour, as Cyane was in port at San Francisco from February 15 to September 28.

Promoted to Lieutenant in February 1864, he was assigned to the steam frigate Minnesota in the North Atlantic Blockading Squadron. In the assault on Fort Fisher on January 14, 1865, Lieutenant Woodward commanded a company of 49 men from the Minnesota, and "behaved bravely," and his conduct was represented as having been "highly commendable" by Commodore Joseph Lanman, commanding Second Division, North Atlantic Squadron. He also "greatly assisted" Lieutenant Commander William B. Cushing, commanding Monticello, with that vessel's boat crews.

== Postwar career ==
After the war, Woodward served on the screw sloop Kearsarge. Kearsarge had been decommissioned in November 1864 after her famous battle with the Confederate raider CSS Alabama off the coast of France the previous June. She recommissioned April 1, 1865, and sailed on the 14th for the coast of Spain in an attempt to intercept CSS Stonewall; but the Confederate ram eluded Federal ships and surrendered to Spanish authorities at Havana, Cuba, on May 19. After cruising the Mediterranean Sea and the English Channel south to Monrovia, Liberia, Kearsarge decommissioned August 14, 1866 in the Boston Navy Yard.

Woodward married, on August 9, 1866, Mary Elizabeth Hawley, daughter of Rev. Bostwick and Elizabeth (Webber) Hawley. According to the 1910 census, Mary had four children, none of whom were still living at that time, but the 1880 census, when Edwin and Mary were enumerated with her father in Saratoga Springs, New York, did not list any children. Woodward was also promoted to Lieutenant Commander in 1866.

In 1867 and 1868, Woodward served on Guerriere, a screw sloop recommissioned on May 21, 1867, which sailed from New York Harbor on June 28, 1867, to serve as flagship of the South Atlantic Squadron protecting American commerce and interests along the coast of South America."

In 1869, Woodward served on board the newly built gunboat Quinnebaug and the Civil War-era gunboat Kansas, along the Atlantic coast of South America and the western coast of Africa, probably returning to Washington on September 15, 1869, when the Kansas was decommissioned.

He was assigned to the Brooklyn Navy Yard from 1869 to 1871, reassigned to the Philadelphia Naval Shipyard, and probably commanded pre-commissioning crews for the Civil War-era single-turreted monitors Canonicus and Saugus. Canonicus was recommissioned January 22, 1872, and cruised in coastal waters in the Atlantic Ocean and Gulf of Mexico. Saugus was recommissioned November 9, 1872, sailed south, and was based at Key West, Florida, until 1876.

In 1874 and 1875, Woodward served on the Civil War-era screw sloop Brooklyn, which was reactivated January 20, 1874, and operated "along the southern coast of the United States until autumn when she entered the Norfolk Naval Shipyard to be fitted out for service as flagship of the South Atlantic Squadron. She got underway for the coast of Brazil on January 23, 1875, and operated in South American waters protecting American interests until heading home on December 7. Following service in the Home Squadron, she was decommissioned at New York City on July 21, 1876, and laid up."

In 1876, Woodward served on the screw sloop Vandalia. Newly commissioned on January 10, 1876, Vandalia "was soon deployed with the European Squadron and spent most of the next three years cruising in the Mediterranean Sea along the coasts of Africa, the Middle East, and Turkey."

Woodward was ordered to torpedo duty in 1877, was promoted to commander in February 1878. He was stationed at the Philadelphia Naval Shipyard from 1879 to 1880. He was probably on leave in 1880, when he was listed in the New York Census, living with his wife and father-in-law, Bostwick Hawley, in Saratoga Springs, New York.

After his tour at Philadelphia, Woodward was ordered to his first command, Yantic, a Civil War vintage wooden-hulled screw gunboat. Under his command, Yantic's crew took part in celebrations attending the unveiling of the statue of Admiral David G. Farragut in Washington, D.C., on April 25, 1881, before sailing later that spring to Mexican waters. In June, at Progreso, Yucatán, she investigated the detention of the American bark Acacia before returning northward to familiar waters off the eastern seaboard of the United States." Woodward received the thanks of the State Department, probably in relation to the Acacia incident. In October 1881, Yantic also took part in observances commemorating the centennial of the Battle of Groton Heights and in festivities celebrating the centennial of the American victory at Yorktown, Virginia."

In 1884, Woodward is supposed to have commanded a squadron of ironclads, including the Passaic, Nantucket and Alarm, but the ships' histories do not appear to support such a squadron. Passaic was a Civil War-era coastal monitor stationed at the Naval Academy, Annapolis, from 1883 to 1892. Nantucket was also a Civil War-era coastal monitor, briefly recommissioned between June and October 1884; it operated along the northern east coast. Alarm was an experimental torpedo boat which conducted research duties at New York in 1884 and served there until she was placed out of commission in 1885 and berthed at New York. This time frame bears more research. Whatever he did, Woodward received a commendatory letter from the Secretary of the Navy for his activities.

Woodward commanded Swatara, a screw sloop, from 1885 and 1886. The highlight of Swatara's activities during his command was the transport of a cargo of gold bullion from New Orleans, Louisiana, to Washington, D.C., in September 1885. "In early 1886, she was assigned hydrographic duties fixing locations on the Puerto Rican coast. After subsequently cruising as far north as Halifax, Nova Scotia, Swatara arrived at the Portsmouth Naval Shipyard, where she was decommissioned on October 27, 1886," and Woodward relinquished command.

In 1888, Woodward was in temporary command of Terror, a monitor under construction at the New York Navy Yard.

Woodward spent his last two years at sea in command of the screw steamer Adams. Originally commissioned in 1876, Adams had spent several years in the Pacific before returning to Mare Island Naval Shipyard for a brief period of repairs in early 1889. On April 22, 1889, Commander Woodward in command, "Adams took on stores and supplies before departing San Francisco on June 18. She arrived at Honolulu on Independence Day 1889 and remained there for a month."

"The duration of her stay in Hawaii resulted from the maturation of a plot to dethrone King Kalākaua and dissolve the reform government installed by American business and missionary interests as a result of the "Bloodless Revolution of 1887" that had been carried out in the course of Adams' previous extended sojourn in the islands. During the night of 29 and July 30, insurgents occupied the palace grounds and a local militia unit, styled the Honolulu Rifles, took up positions in support of the government. By the evening of the 30th, the Honolulu Rifles had subdued the insurrection." At that point, Woodward sent a landing party from the ship which established itself in the vicinity of the American legation. But the Hawaiian government restored order quickly without the necessity of American intervention, and the landing party returned to ship the following morning.

On August 4, 1889, Adams departed Honolulu and sailed a course south to Samoa, arriving at Apia harbor, Samoa on August 20. For the next nine months, she remained in those islands serving as American station ship there making periodic visits to various islands. On May 2, 1890, Adams set sail from Pago Pago bound via Hawaii for the west coast of the United States. She entered San Francisco Bay on June 24 and moored at the Mare Island Naval Shipyard on the 25th. There she was placed out of commission, in ordinary, on July 31, 1890.

In 1892 he was assigned as Light House Inspector in the 10th Light House District, which comprised 114 miles of the St. Lawrence River as well as Lake Ontario, Lake Erie and the Niagara River. Of note, he relieved Commander Charles Vernon Gridley, who would later command Olympia, Commodore George Dewey's flagship, during the attack on Manila at the beginning of the Spanish–American War. During his tenure, Woodward, on behalf of the United States Government, presented a life-saving medal second class to Miss Maebelle L. Mason, at the 'Cadillac Hotel,' Detroit, during the National Convention of the Grand Army of the Republic. Mason had rowed more than a mile in a small flat-bottomed punt, from the Mamajuda lighthouse on the Detroit river, where she lived with her father, and rescued a man who had capsized in his row-boat.

Woodward was placed on the retired list on July 3, 1893, and died February 22, 1894, in Saratoga Springs, New York; interment in Greenridge Cemetery.
