= William Tilton =

Medal of Honor recipient (1834–1910)

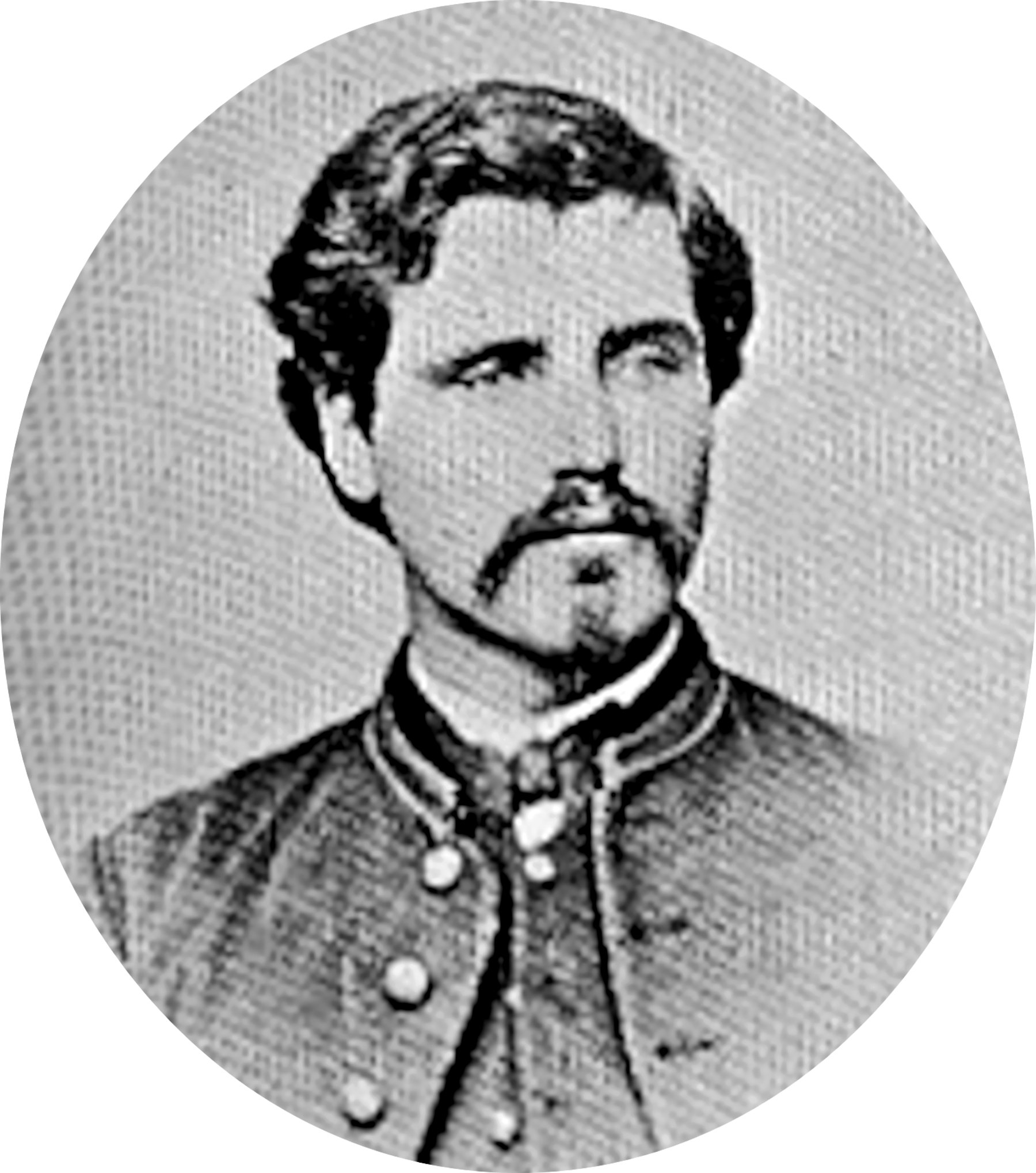
- Born: October 27, 1834; St. Albans, Vermont
- Died: March 8, 1910 (aged 75)
- Burial place: Enfield, New Hampshire
- Military career
- Allegiance: United States of America
- Branch: United States Army
- Rank: Sergeant
- Units: Company C, 7th New Hampshire Infantry
- Conflicts: American Civil War
- Awards: Medal of Honor

William Tilton (October 27, 1834 – March 8, 1910) was an American soldier who fought in the American Civil War. Tilton received his country's highest award for bravery during combat, the Medal of Honor. Tilton's medal was won for his 'gallant conduct in the field' during the Richmond campaign during 1864. He was honored with the award on February 20, 1884.

Tilton was born in St. Albans, Vermont, and entered service in Hanover, New Hampshire. He was buried in Enfield, New Hampshire.

== Medal of Honor citation ==
The President of the United States of America, in the name of Congress, takes pleasure in presenting the Medal of Honor to Sergeant William Tilton, United States Army, for extraordinary heroism on 1864, while serving with Company C, 7th New Hampshire Infantry, in action at Richmond Campaign, Virginia, for gallant conduct in the field.

== See also ==
- List of American Civil War Medal of Honor recipients: T–Z
