= Thomas W. Costello =

American politician (born 1945)

Personal details
- Born: July 8, 1945 (age 81) Rutland, Vermont, U.S.
- Party: Democratic
- Education: Saint Michael's College; Boston University School of Law (JD)
- Profession: Lawyer

Thomas W. Costello (born July 8, 1945) is a politician from the U.S. state of Vermont. He served in the Vermont House of Representatives from 1976 to 1980, and from 1994 to 2000.

== Early life and education ==
Thomas Costello, the son of Bartley and Catherine Costello, was born in Rutland, Vermont, where he grew up. He graduated from Mount St. Joseph High School in 1963. He graduated from Saint Michael's College in Burlington in 1968; he went on to earn his Juris Doctor degree from Boston University Law School in 1974. He has four brothers, including Admiral Barry M. Costello.

== Military service ==
From 1968 through 1971, Costello was an officer (First Lieutenant) in the United States Marine Corps and served in the Vietnam War. He was in combat and received a Bronze Star with a Combat V for valor and a Purple Heart. Costello served in the period between his graduation from Saint Michael's and his enrollment at Boston University Law School.

== Legal career ==
Costello has practiced law since he graduated law school. He practiced at Webber & Costello in Rutland from 1974 until 1980, when he moved to Brattleboro. From 1980 to 1983 he practiced with Elliot Barber at Barber & Costello. He then started his own firm, Costello Law Offices, where he practices to this day. He served on the Vermont Advisory Committee of Civil Rules from 1988 until 1991 and on the Special Committee on Judicial Retention and Confirmation in 1990. He later served on Vermont's Judicial Nominating Committee from 1998-2002. He served on the Vermont Trial Lawyers Association Board of Governors from 1990-97.

== Political career ==
Costello was a representative in the Vermont House of Representatives for Rutland City from 1976 to 1980, when he moved to Brattleboro, Vermont. He served three additional terms in the legislature from 1994 through 2000, representing the Town of Brattleboro. During his five terms in the House, Costello was the Chair of the Judiciary Committee (from 1994 though 1998) and Chair of the Committee on General, Housing & Military affairs (from 1999 through 2000).

== 2008 election ==
On September 9, 2008 Costello faced off against Nate Freeman, a local businessman, in the primary. Amid a low turnout Costello won with 61% of the vote but lost to incumbent Republican Brian Dubie in the general election.

Party political offices
Preceded by Matt Dunne	Democratic nominee for Lieutenant Governor of Vermont; 2008	Succeeded by Steven Howard
