= Portrait of Leslie W. Miller =

1901 painting by Thomas Eakins

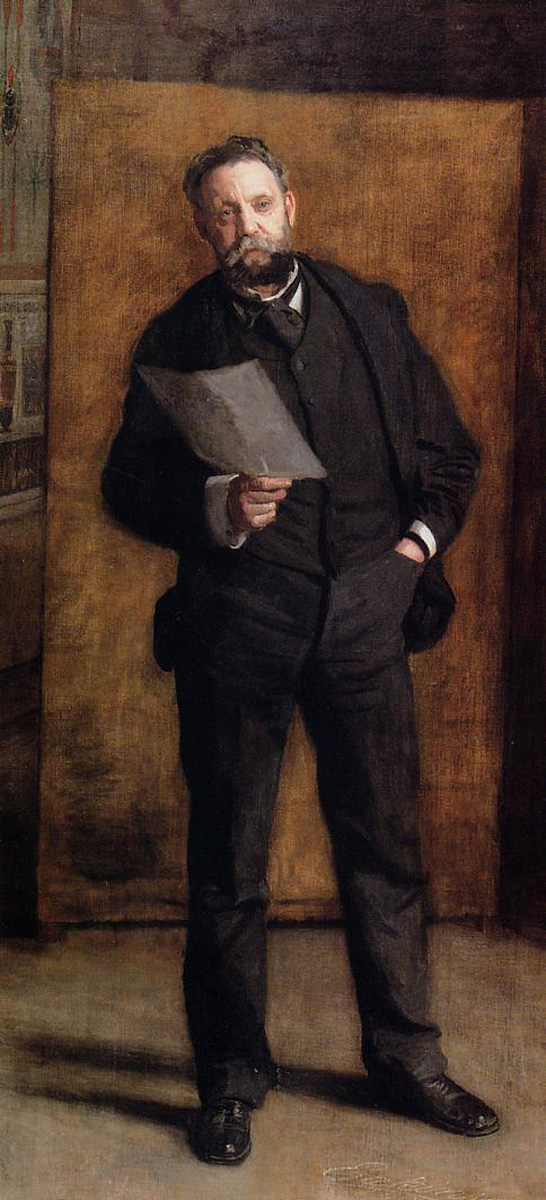
- G-348.
- Artist: Thomas Eakins
- Year: 1901
- Type: Oil on burlap canvas
- Dimensions: 223.8 cm × 111.8 cm (88 1/8 in × 44 in)
- Location: Philadelphia Museum of Art; Philadelphia

Portrait of Leslie W. Miller is a 1901 painting by Thomas Eakins, Goodrich catalogue #348. It is in the permanent collection of the Philadelphia Museum of Art.

== The sitter ==
Professor Leslie William Miller (August 5, 1848 – March 7, 1931) was an artist, educator, and principal of the Pennsylvania Museum and School of Industrial Art for forty years, 1880–1920. He was born in Brattleboro, Vermont, and studied at the School of the Museum of Fine Arts, Boston. He graduated from the Massachusetts Normal Art School (now Massachusetts College of Art) in 1874, and worked as a portrait painter. He returned to MNAS to teach, and completed a second degree in 1880.

The Pennsylvania Museum and School of Industrial Art (PMSIA) had been chartered in 1876, and was housed in Memorial Hall, the art gallery from the 1876 Centennial Exposition. The school began classes in Fall 1877, in a building at 312 North Broad Street, and soon expanded into the old Franklin Institute (now the Philadelphia History Museum), at 15 South 7th Street. Miller came to Philadelphia in Summer 1880 as PMSIA's first principal, at the same time that Eakins was teaching at the Pennsylvania Academy of the Fine Arts. Miller registered for PAFA's life classes in February 1881. Colleagues in Philadelphia's artistic circles, Eakins and Miller became close friends. Miller was a member of the American Philosophical Society, the Historical Society of Pennsylvania, and was a founder of the Art Club of Philadelphia. As secretary of the Fairmount Park Art Association (1900–20), he was involved in public art decisions for the City, including the layout of the Benjamin Franklin Parkway and the design of the Philadelphia Museum of Art. He was an honorary member of Philadelphia's T-Square Club, and of the Philadelphia chapter of the American Institute of Architects.

== Description ==
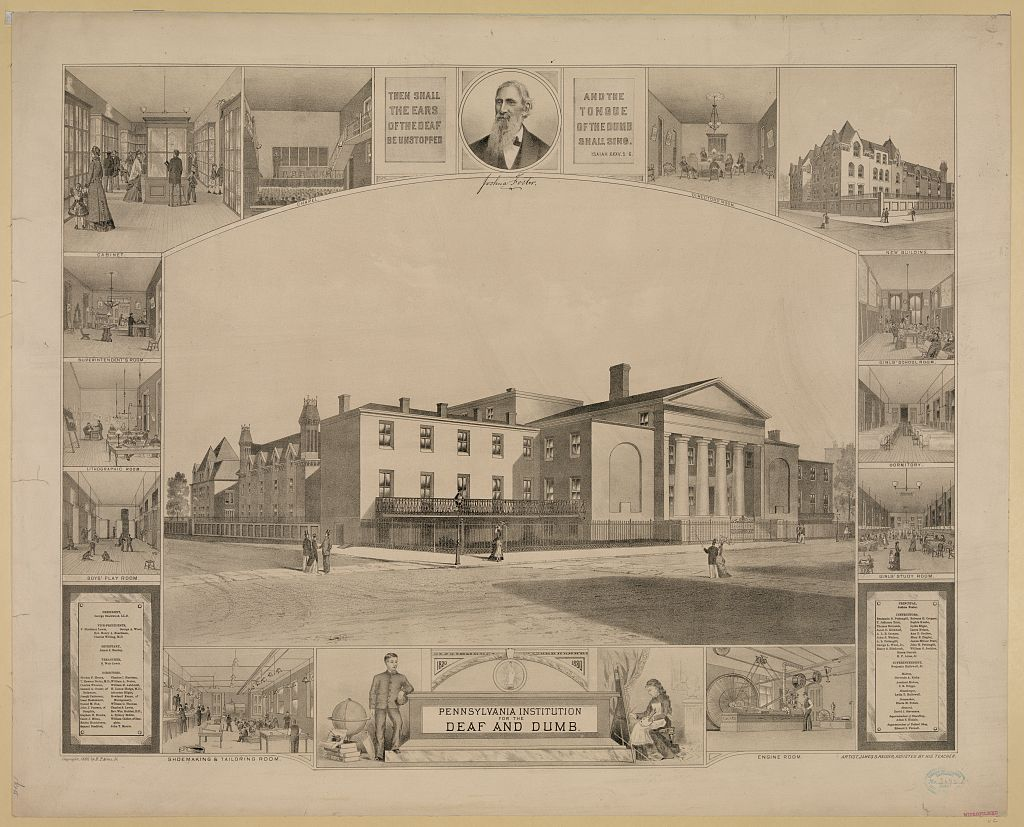
Pennsylvania Museum and School of Industrial Art, Broad & Pine Sts., Philadelphia. This is now Hamilton Hall, University of the Arts.

In 1892, the Pennsylvania Institution for the Deaf and Dumb (now Pennsylvania School for the Deaf) moved to a suburban campus in the Germantown section of Philadelphia. The following year, its vacant buildings at Broad & Pine Streets were bought by the Pennsylvania Museum and School of Industrial Art's trustees, and renovated for the art school's needs.

Former student Charles Sheeler recalled Eakins visiting PMSIA to work on the portrait (probably in late 1900):

"One day a stocky little man, gray-haired and gray-bearded, passed through our workroom. His trousers were tucked into short leather boots and fitted so snugly as to make the braces over his dark sweater superfluous. Neither his appearance nor his manner offered a clew [sic] as to the reason for his visit. A few days later he returned and passed to the life-class room, just beyond where we were working. Knotholes in the board partition were used at intervals and permitted us to satisfy our curiosity. The stocky little man was beginning a portrait of the principal of the school, Leslie Miller, and before long the plan of the picture was indicated. The subject was to be portrayed standing easily with one hand in his trousers pocket and the other holding a manuscript from which he raised his eyes as if to direct them toward an audience. As the artist's work continued we witnessed the progress of a perspective drawing which was made on paper and then transferred to the canvas, to account for charts of ornament receding into the background—those charts which we knew only too well. This careful procedure led us to the conclusion that the man, whoever he was, couldn't be a great artist, for we had learned somewhere that great artists painted only by inspiration, a process akin to magic."

"Several months were thus consumed; then came the day, as we discovered through the convenient knotholes, when another perspective drawing was made and transferred to the canvas, on the floor and to one side. The letters spelled Eakins. The name was not familiar to us."

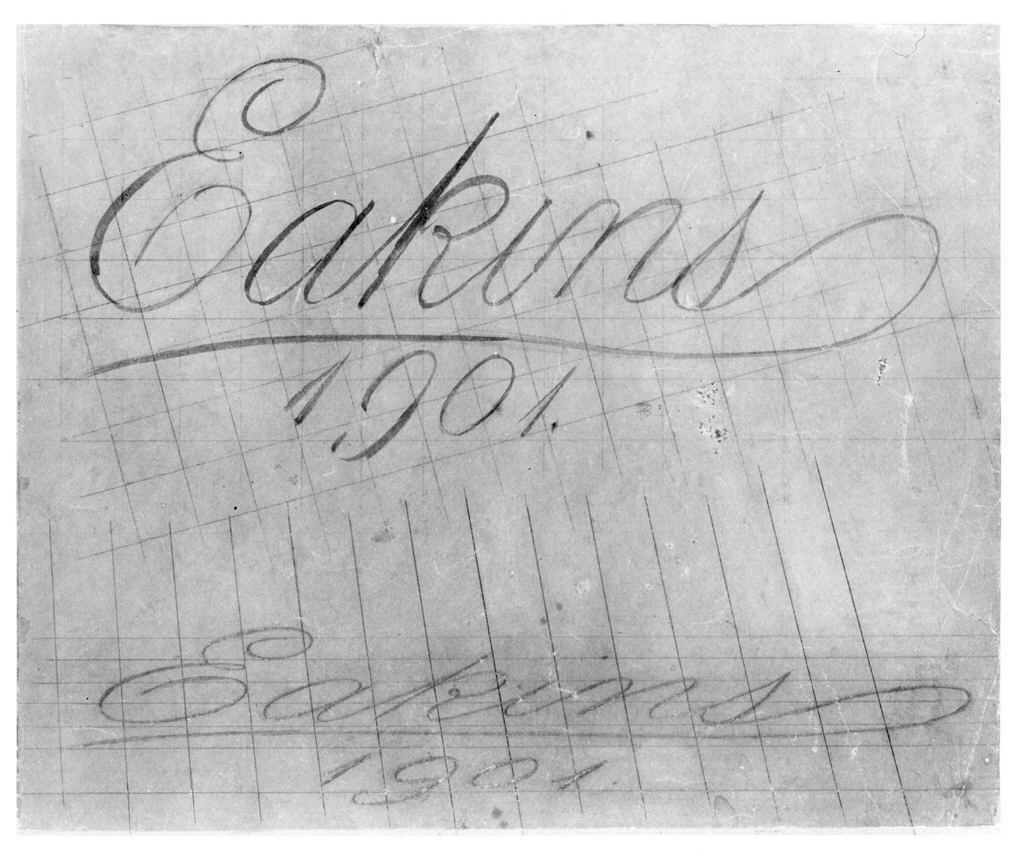
G-349A. Perspective drawing of Eakins's signature (1901), Hirshhorn Museum and Sculpture Garden.

Of the perspective drawings described by Sheeler, only one is known to survive, that of Eakins's signature. He signed the painting (in perspective) at Miller's feet. In the nearly life-sized, full-length portrait, Miller is depicted as if lecturing to a class. The painting's eye level is unusually high and the color range limited, leading the viewer to Miller's face. Its informality makes this a democratic formal portrait. Eakins exhibited Miller's portrait seven times. It was awarded the Thomas R. Proctor Prize at the National Academy of Design in 1905, and the second class medal at the Carnegie Institute in 1907.

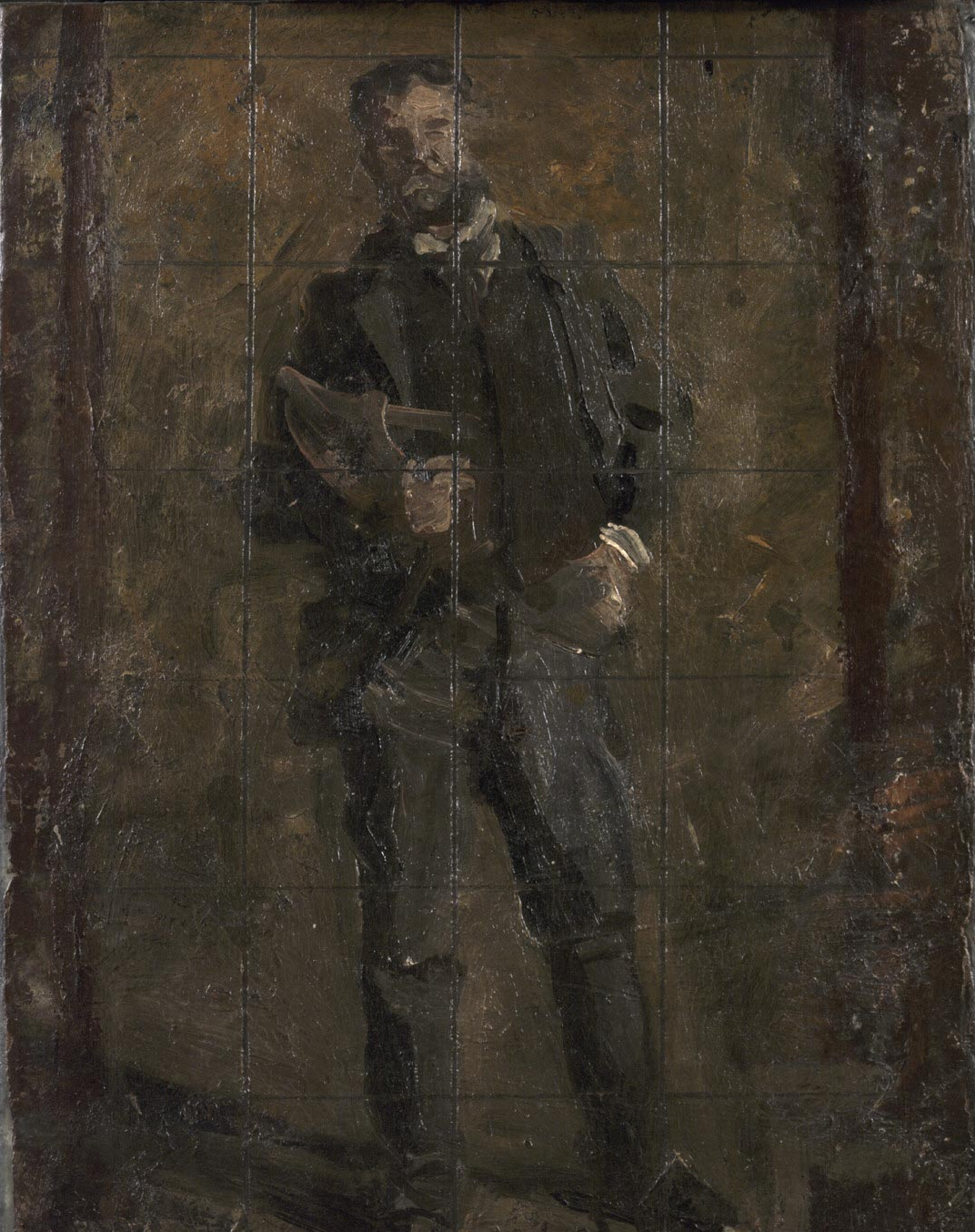
G-349. Sketch for Portrait of Leslie W. Miller (1901), Philadelphia Museum of Art.

Miller later wrote of the painting:

"The primitive, even shabby frame represents Eakins' taste rather than mine as do the old nondescript clothes in which the subject is garbed which he begged me to rescue from the slop-chest and put on for the occasion, and personally I should be very glad to have the frame at least spruced up a bit.
"Ever since I found out how much of a picture he was going to make of it, I have been haunted by a mild regret that I didn't insist on his painting me,—if he painted me at all,— in habilments [sic] that would at least have been more like those I would have worn when appearing in any such character as that in which he has done me the honor to portray me, but, as is evident throughout all his work, he had a passion for the ultra informal which sometimes carried him so far as to lead him to prefer the unfit to the fit if it were only old, and worn and familiar enough.
"But all that is part of the Eakins hallmark and of course it cannot be spared. He was one of the great ones and I value the picture very highly."

The Metropolitan Museum of Art hosted a memorial exhibition of Eakins's work in November 1917. In a letter to his students at the Art Students League of New York, artist and teacher Robert Henri wrote:

"Look, if you will, ... at the portrait of Miller for a man's feeling for a man. This is what I call a beautiful portrait; not a pretty or a swagger portrait, but an honest, respectful, appreciative man-to-man portrait.
"Eakins's pictures and his sculptures are the recordings of a man who lived and studied and loved with a strong heart."

== See also ==
- List of works by Thomas Eakins
