= Emma Bailey =

American auctioneer and author

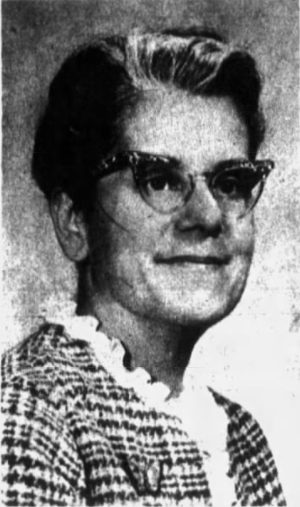
- Emma Bailey in 1966
- Born: March 6, 1910; New York City, US
- Died: September 3, 1999 (aged 89)
- Occupations: Auctioneer, author
- Years active: 1950 – late 1960s
- Known for: First American woman auctioneer
- Children: 2

Emma Bailey (née Parascandola; March 6, 1910 – September 3, 1999) was an American auctioneer and author, credited with being the first American woman auctioneer. She held her first auction in Brattleboro, Vermont, on May 12, 1950, as a way to supplement her family's income. In 1952 she became the first woman admitted to the National Auctioneers Association. She continued auctioneering for nearly 20 years and wrote a book about her experiences, entitled Sold to the Lady in the Green Hat (1962), before retiring in the late 1960s.

== Early life ==
Emma Parascandola was born March 6, 1910, in New York City. She had two brothers and two sisters, and completed her schooling in Newark, New Jersey. She married Eli J. Bailey in 1932.

== Career ==
In 1945, Emma Bailey moved to Brattleboro, Vermont, with her husband and two children. Eli worked as a substitute teacher at the local high school. Since their new home was an old house in need of repair, and the family was having difficulty paying bills, Bailey decided to start an auction business to supplement her husband's income. In April 1950, Bailey placed the following advertisement in the local newspaper:

The Bailey Auction Barn on Black Mountain Road is prepared to handle auction sales. Courteous and efficient handling of all consignments, large or small. We will sell anything—from a plate to an estate, signed: Emma Bailey, Brattleboro's Woman Auctioneer.

On May 12, 1950, Bailey sold her first item, a 50-year-old rocking chair, for a price of $2.50. Her Saturday auctions soon became a regular local event, and her family helped out: Bailey's husband organized the sale items, and her daughters did the record-keeping and sold concessions. Bailey sold a wide range of items, including antiques, farm tools, books and household furniture, and was known for her "poetic" promotional descriptions of wares. She developed a reputation for fairness and "scrupulous honesty," once putting police onto a group of antiques thieves who had approached Bailey under false pretenses for help selling their goods.

In 1952, after applying to the National Auctioneers Association, Bailey was accepted as the first female member of the Association. She wrote a book about her experiences, titled Sold to the Lady in the Green Hat (1962). She continued her auction sales for almost 20 years before retiring "at the peak of her career" in the late 1960s.

During her time as auctioneer, Bailey encountered opposition based on her gender: her first auction was postponed for several weeks after a male competitor accused her of breaking a zoning law. Her early sales were sometimes disrupted by men who "gathered in front of the podium and heckled." Later, when Bailey and a rival male auctioneer both expressed interest in the same sale, the man proposed that he should get the sale because "he had a family to support", whereas Bailey already had a working husband. Bailey lost the sale. Despite her induction to the National Auctioneer's Association, Bailey was not always well supported by her peers: in 1960, when a reporter inquired about women auctioneers, the Association's response was that "although a woman had tried auctioneering in Vermont, she had found it too hard and quit."

== Death and legacy ==
Bailey died on September 3, 1999. The Wisconsin auction house Bailey's Honor Auction, LLC, owned by auctioneer Carol Miller, is named after Emma Bailey.
