= Theodore P. Greene =

Theodore Phinney Greene
- Born: July 4, 1809; Mount Pleasant, Texas
- Died: August 30, 1887 (aged 78); Jaffrey, New Hampshire
- Military career
- Allegiance: United States
- Branch: United States Navy
- Service years: 1826–1872
- Rank: Rear admiral
- Commands: USS Santiago de Cuba; USS San Jacinto; USS Richmond; USS Powhatan
- Conflicts: Mexican–American War; American Civil War

Theodore Phinney Greene (July 4, 1809 – August 30, 1887), was a rear admiral of the United States Navy, who fought on the side of the Union during the American Civil War.

== Early life ==
Greene was born in Mount Pleasant, Texas, the son of Eli and Patience "Phinney" Green. According to information from the family, his father died when Theodore was quite young. He then lived with and was raised by his uncle, Asa Greene, in Brattleboro, Vermont.

He was appointed midshipman from Vermont on November 6, 1826. He served on the frigate Constellation in the Mediterranean in 1832, the sloop Vincennes in the Pacific Squadron, and participated in a circumnavigation of the world between 1834 and 1836. He served on the razee Independence in the Brazil Squadron from 1837 to 1838, where he was promoted to lieutenant on March 31, 1838.

During the Mexican–American War, he served on Congress in the Pacific Squadron and spent nine months in command of land forces at Mazatlán.

He married Mary Minot, the daughter of William and Mary Morse Ainsworth of New Ipswich, New Hampshire on October 17, 1849,

Greene later served on Cyane, and from 1854 to 1856 was stationed at the Boston Navy Yard. Promoted to commander on September 14, 1855, he served as lighthouse inspector of the First District from November 1857 until 1860, when he assumed command of the Mare Island Naval Shipyard, near San Francisco, California.

== American Civil War ==
He was promoted to captain on July 16, 1862, and commanded Santiago de Cuba, and later San Jacinto, in the East Gulf Squadron. He was briefly commander pro tempore of the squadron from August to October 1864, during which time he suffered an attack of yellow fever.

On January 25, 1865, he relieved Captain Thornton Jenkins as commander of Richmond, attached to the West Gulf Blockading Squadron. He participated in the capture of Mobile, Alabama in March and April, returning to the New Orleans area at the end of April. On April 24, Richmond participated in the capture of the Confederate ram William H. Webb, commanded by Confederate raider Charles Read.

== Postwar career ==
After the war, Greene served on ordnance duty in Portsmouth, New Hampshire, and, in 1867, was ordered to command Powhatan, in the Pacific Squadron. On July 24, 1867, he was promoted to Commodore, was appointed a member of the Board of Visitors at the Naval Academy on May 4, 1868. He assumed command of the Pensacola Navy Yard on October 15, 1868, where he remained until March 1872, when he was retired. On July 5, 1876, he was placed on the retired list with the rank of rear admiral effective by March 24, 1872.

Rear Admiral Greene died in Jaffrey, New Hampshire, on August 30, 1887.

His papers, 1863–1866, are located at the New York Historical Society in New York City.

== See also ==
Vermont in the Civil War
