= Ida May Fuller =

American schoolteacher and legal secretary

- Born: September 6, 1874; Ludlow Town, Vermont, U.S.
- Died: January 31, 1975 (aged 100); Brattleboro, Vermont
- Resting place: Pleasant View Cemetery, Ludlow Village, Vermont
- Education: Black River Academy, Ludlow Village, Vermont; Pernin Institute of Shorthand and Bookkeeping, Boston
- Occupations: Schoolteacher; Legal secretary; Bookkeeper
- Known for: First recipient of regular Social Security benefits

Ida May Fuller (September 6, 1874 – January 31, 1975) was a Vermont schoolteacher and legal secretary, who was the first beneficiary of recurring monthly Social Security payments.

== Early life ==
Fuller was born at her family's Jewell Brook Road farm in Ludlow, Vermont, on September 6, 1874, the daughter of Henry W. Fuller and Laura (Haven) Fuller. Fuller's family traced its American roots to Mayflower passengers Samuel and Edward Fuller, and to Peregrine White, the first child born in America to English Pilgrim parents, in 1620. She attended school in Ludlow and graduated from Black River Academy, where her contemporaries at the academy included Calvin Coolidge. After her graduation, Fuller became a schoolteacher in Ludlow. In 1903 and 1904, Fuller was a student in the business college course at the Pernin Institute of Shorthand and Bookkeeping in Boston. (Note: The Pernin method was a shorthand style developed by Helen M. Pernin (d. 1905) of Detroit. Schools that taught Pernin shorthand and other business courses were established in many American cities during the late 19th and early 20th centuries.)

== Career ==
In 1905, Fuller became a stenographer, legal secretary, and bookkeeper at the Ludlow law firm of John G. Sargent, William W. Stickney, and Paul A. Chase. During Sargent's service as Vermont Attorney General from 1908 to 1912, Fuller was his legal secretary and stenographer as he traveled throughout the state to carry out the duties of his office.

In addition to her career as a legal secretary, Fuller was active in Ludlow's Baptist church, including terms as treasurer for missionary activities and church auditor. Fuller was also involved in civic causes, including serving as treasurer for Ludlow residents who pledged funds to pay for Chautauqua lecturers to visit the town each summer. She also took part in local business ventures, including the Ludlow Insurance Agency, of which she was an original incorporator.

Fuller worked under Social Security just shy of three years, from the spring of 1937 to November 1939, and paid a total of $24.75 (equivalent to $522 in 2025) in Social Security taxes. She filed her retirement claim on November 4, 1939, aged 65; while visiting Rutland, she stopped at the regional Social Security office to ask about benefits. She later observed: "It wasn't that I expected anything, mind you, but I knew I'd been paying for something called Social Security and I wanted to ask the people in Rutland about it." Her application was transmitted to the Claims Division in Washington for adjudication. After approval, it was sent to the Treasury Department. Claims were grouped in batches of 1,000, and a certification list for each batch was sent to Treasury. Fuller's claim was the first one on the first certification list, so the first Social Security check (check number 00-000-001), dated January 31, 1940, was issued to Fuller in the amount of $22.54 (equivalent to $518 in 2025).

== Later life ==
During her retirement, Fuller collected a total of $22,888.92 (equivalent to $526,010 in 2025) in Social Security benefits. As monthly payments increased in the 1950s and 1960s, Fuller typically received the first check issued for the new amount, which was usually the subject of news reports. When she received the first check following a September 1965 increase in monthly benefits, it arrived with a letter from President Lyndon Johnson, who also called Fuller to extend good wishes on her birthday.

Fuller never married and had no children. She lived most of her life in Ludlow and spent the last eight years of her life living with her niece, Hazel Perkins, in Brattleboro. Fuller died in Brattleboro on January 27, 1975, at the age of 100 and was buried at Pleasant View Cemetery in Ludlow.
