= Barry M. Costello =

American navy officer

Barry M Costello
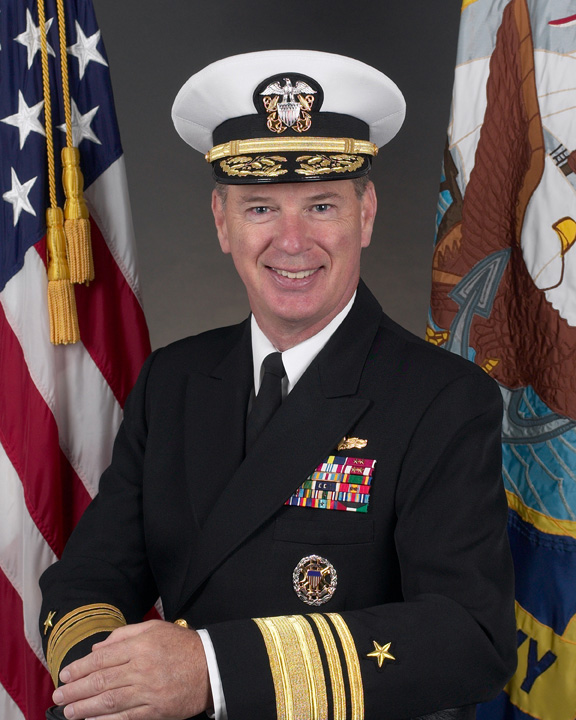
- VADM Barry M. Costello
- Born: January 31, 1951 (age 75); Rutland, Vermont
- Education: College of the Holy Cross (BA); Albany Law School (JD); Naval War College (MA); Harvard University
- Military career
- Allegiance: United States of America
- Branch: United States Navy
- Service years: 1973-2007
- Rank: Vice Admiral
- Commands: US Third Fleet
- Conflicts: Gulf War
- Awards: Defense Distinguished Service Medal; Navy Distinguished Service Medal; Legion of Merit (3); Bronze Star; Meritorious Service Medal (3); Navy Commendation Medal (2)

Vice Admiral Barry Michael Costello (born January 31, 1951) is an American navy officer who served as commander of Third Fleet of the United States Navy from May 2005 to May 2007.

== Biography ==
Costello was born in Rutland, Vermont, the son of Bartley Costello, a lawyer, and Catherine (née O'Brien). He is of Irish descent. He attended College of the Holy Cross and was commissioned an ensign through the NROTC Program in 1973. Costello, by then a vice admiral, reported as commander of the Third Fleet in May 2005 following a tour as chief of legislative affairs.

His sea tours include: navigator in Brownson; weapons officer in Whipple; operations officer of Destroyer Squadron Five; executive officer in Harry W. Hill; commanding officer in Elliot; assistant chief of staff for operations, Third Fleet; commander, Destroyer Squadron 23; commander, Cruiser Destroyer Group One, Constellation Strike Group commander, and commander of Task Force 55 during Operation Iraqi Freedom.

He attended Albany Law School, where he earned a Juris Doctor degree and is currently a member of the New York State Bar. He also attended the College of Naval Command and Staff, where he was selected as honor graduate, graduating "With Distinction," and earned a Master of Arts degree in foreign affairs. Additionally, he has participated in the National Security program at John F. Kennedy School of Government at Harvard University.

Costello's primary shore assignments include: joint planner in the Operational and Interoperability Directorate (J7), the Joint Staff, and principal deputy for senate liaison in the navy's Office of Legislative Affairs; and deputy director for strategy and policy (J5), the Joint Staff.

== Awards and decorations ==
Costello's personal decorations include: the Defense Distinguished Service Medal, the Navy Distinguished Service Medal, the Legion of Merit with two gold stars, the Bronze Star, the Defense Meritorious Service Medal, the Meritorious Service Medal with two gold stars, and the Navy Commendation Medal with gold star.

- Defense Distinguished Service Medal
- Navy Distinguished Service Medal
- Legion of Merit with two gold stars
- Bronze Star
- Defense Meritorious Service Medal
- Meritorious Service Medal with two gold stars
- Navy and Marine Corps Commendation Medal with gold star
