= Association Residence Nursing Home =

Building in Manhattan, New York

- U.S. National Register of Historic Places
- New York State Register of Historic Places
- New York City Landmark
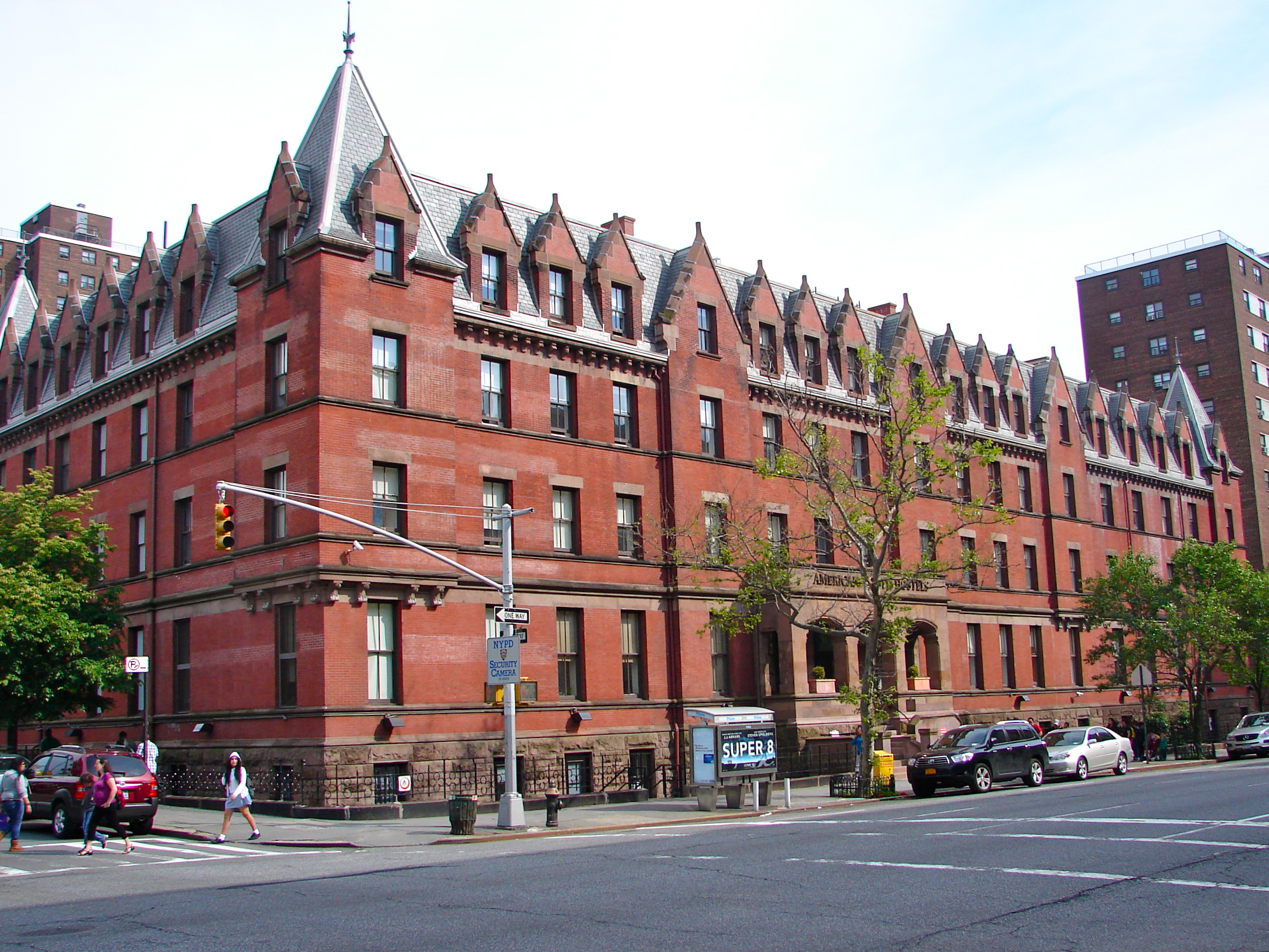
- View from the northwest
- Location: 891 Amsterdam Ave., Manhattan, New York
- Coordinates: 40°47′55″N 73°58′00″W
- Area: 1 acre (0.40 ha)
- Built: 1881
- Architect: Richard Morris Hunt
- NRHP reference No.: 75001201
- NYSRHP No.: 06101.001649
- NYCL No.: 1280

Significant dates
- Added to NRHP: February 20, 1975
- Designated NYSRHP: June 23, 1980
- Designated NYCL: April 12, 1983

The Association Residence Nursing Home, also called the Association for the Relief of Respectable, Aged and Indigent Females, is a historic building in New York City built from 1881–1883 to the design of Richard Morris Hunt in the Victorian Gothic style. It is located on Amsterdam Avenue between 103rd and 104th Streets on the Upper West Side of Manhattan, and is now a hostel run by Hostelling International. The Association was founded in 1814 to help the widows of soldiers of the American Revolutionary War and the War of 1812. An addition to the building was constructed on the south end of the property in 1907, with seven Tiffany windows that are now in the Morse Museum of American Art's collection. The building was placed on the National Register of Historic Places in 1975.

== Association ==
On February 14, 1814, the Society for the Relief of Indigent Respectable Females, as it was first known, was established in New York City. The Society raised private donations, and gave clothing, small stoves, and food to elderly impoverished women "to relieve and comfort those aged females, who once enjoyed a good degree of affluence, but now reduced to poverty by the vicissitudes of Providence." It was run by women, and its first director was Ann Dominick in 1814. With the help of John Jacob Astor and Peter G. Stuyvesant, the Association built an asylum in 1837–38 at 226 East 20th Street and in 1845 added an infirmary. In 1881 the Association bought the lot on Amsterdam Avenue for $77,500 and construction began that fall by contractor John J. Tucker. The choice of the location was influenced by the construction of an elevated railway one block west on Ninth Avenue. The building was completed at a cost of $100,000 in 1883. At its dedication ceremony The New York Times stated that "the degree of comfort, almost amounting to luxury, manifest in every detail of the establishment, elicited from many visitors yesterday the remark that 'they would like to be old women'." The Association operated at the Amsterdam Avenue address until at least 1968.

== Architect ==
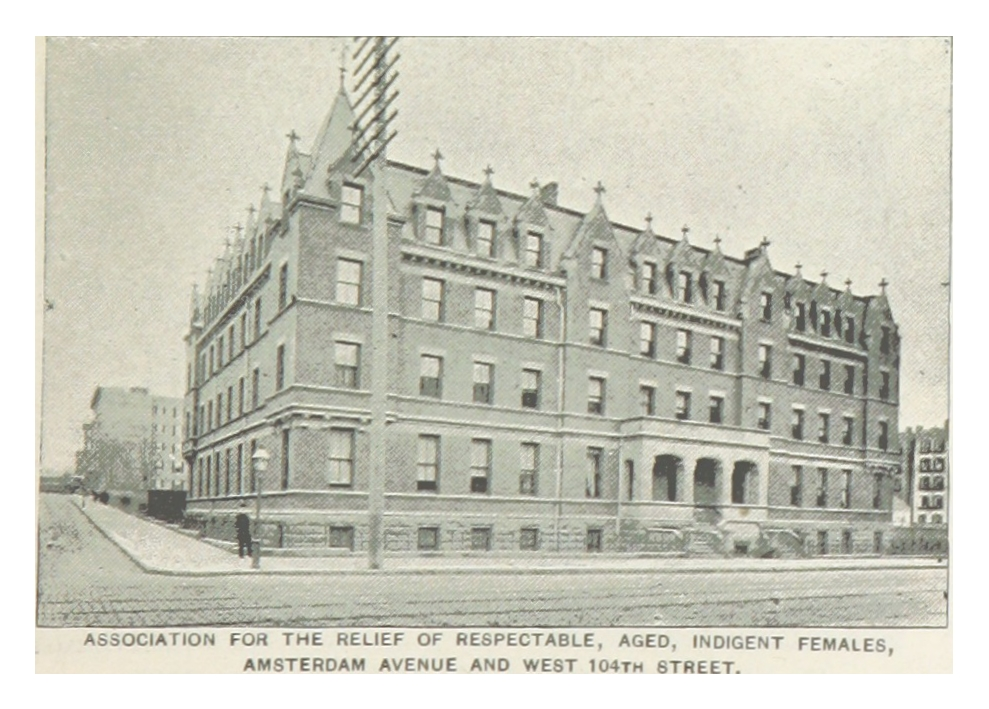
Building in 1893

Richard Morris Hunt was considered the dean of American architects. He was the first American architect trained at the École des Beaux-Arts in Paris. He worked with Thomas U. Walter in expanding the United States Capitol and designed the base of the Statue of Liberty. Though he designed many types of buildings, he is best known for designing the homes of wealthy families such as the Astors and Vanderbilts, along Fifth Avenue in New York City and in Newport, Rhode Island. He designed Biltmore for George W. Vanderbilt.

Hunt's first designs for the Association for the Relief of Respectable, Aged and Indigent Females was made in 1868, though the building wasn't started until 1881. In 1881 he was hired again and produced several variants based on the original plans. Fewer than twenty of the 75 Hunt designed buildings erected in New York City still survive.

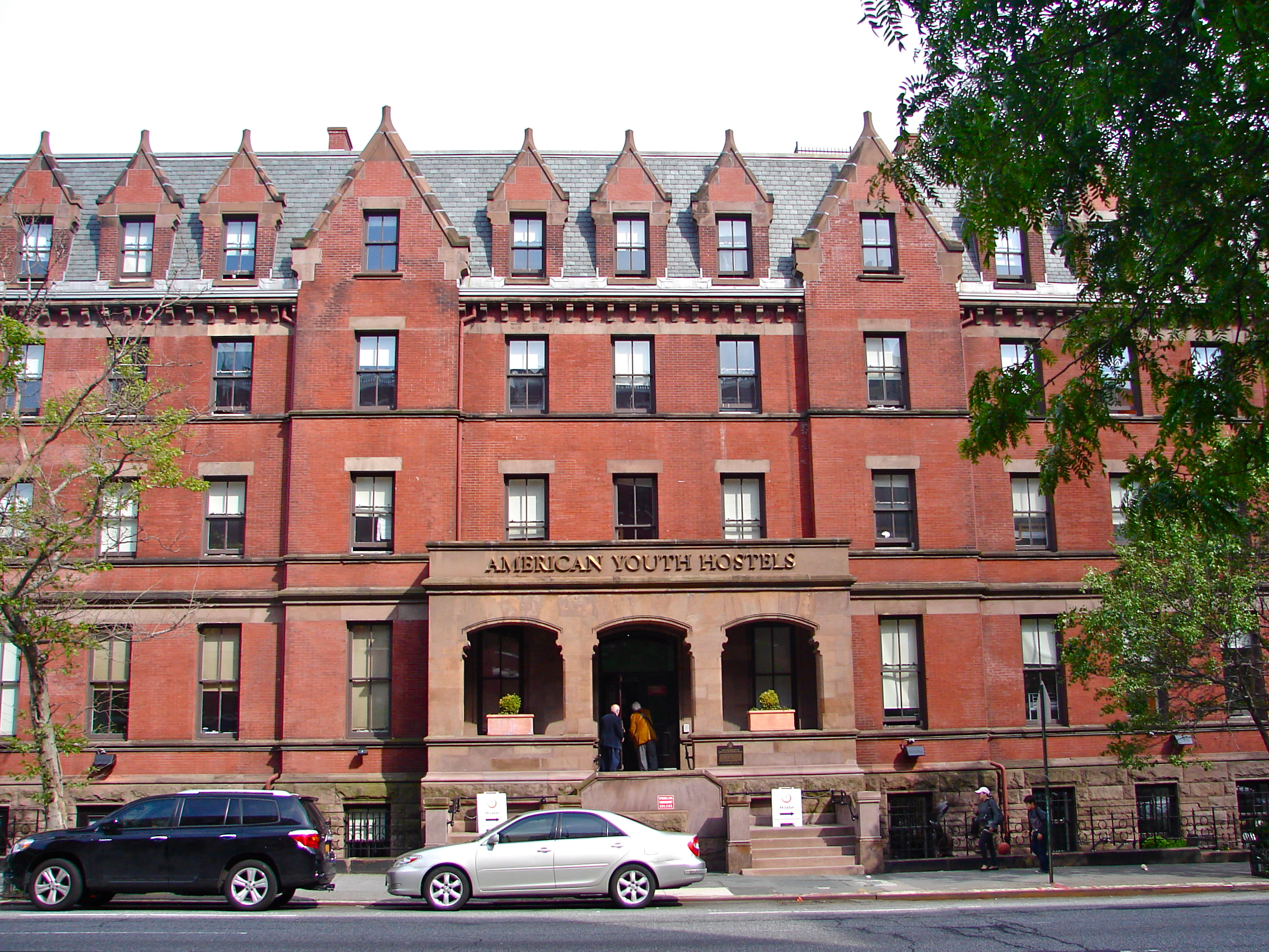
View from the west

== Demise and rehabilitation ==
Financial problems due to the longer life expectancy of residents began following World War II. Robert Moses proposed razing the building as part of an Upper West Side slum clearance project. When Medicaid funds became available to nursing homes in the early 1970s, the Association planned to tear down and replace the building with a modern facility. A group of historic preservationists with ties to nearby Columbia University fought to preserve the building, making it into a community cause. Despite a fire during the New York City blackout of 1977 the preservationists prevailed and by the late 1970s, the building was acquired by the City of New York, and declared a New York City Landmark in 1983. During the 1980s the building was unoccupied as American Youth Hostels arranged neighborhood and government support for rehabilitating the building. They opened the hostel in January 1990 and with 670 beds it is now the largest hostel in North America.

== Sources ==
- The New-York Historical Society, Guide to the Papers of the Association for the Relief of Respectable, Aged and Indigent Females in New York City 1813–1883, accessed May 23, 2011.
- Charles Hosmer Morse Museum of American Art, "Christmas in the Park," accessed May 23, 2011.
- Landmark Preservation Commission, "Association for the Relief of Respectable, Aged Indigent Females." April 12, 1983, accessed May 23, 2011.
