= Ogden Mills House =

Demolished mansion in Manhattan, New York

Coordinates: 40.7705°N 73.9682°W

- Interactive map of the Ogden Mills House area

General information
- Construction started: 1885
- Completed: 1887
- Demolished: late 1930s

Design and construction
- Architect: Richard Morris Hunt
- Main contractor: David H. King, Jr.

The Ogden Mills House was a former mansion located on 2 East 69th Street on the Upper East Side of Manhattan in New York City.

== History ==
The Ogden Mills House was designed by famed architect Richard Morris Hunt and overlooked Central Park. It was constructed at the corner of East 69th Street and Park Avenue on the Upper East Side for Ogden Mills between 1885 and 1887. It was located across the street from both the E. H. Harriman town house and 1 East 70th Street, a mansion constructed in 1912–1914 by Thomas Hastings of Carrère and Hastings, which today houses the Frick Collection of Carnegie Steel Company chairman Henry Clay Frick.

Unlike Hunt's 1886 project, built in the Châteauesque style and known as the Petit Chateau for William K. Vanderbilt, the Ogden Mills House was much more restrained in its style.

After Mills' death in 1929, the home was left to his son, U.S. Treasury Secretary and U.S. Representative Ogden Livingston Mills, who died at the residence on October 11, 1937. The house was torn down in the late 1930s and an apartment building was erected in its place.

== See also ==
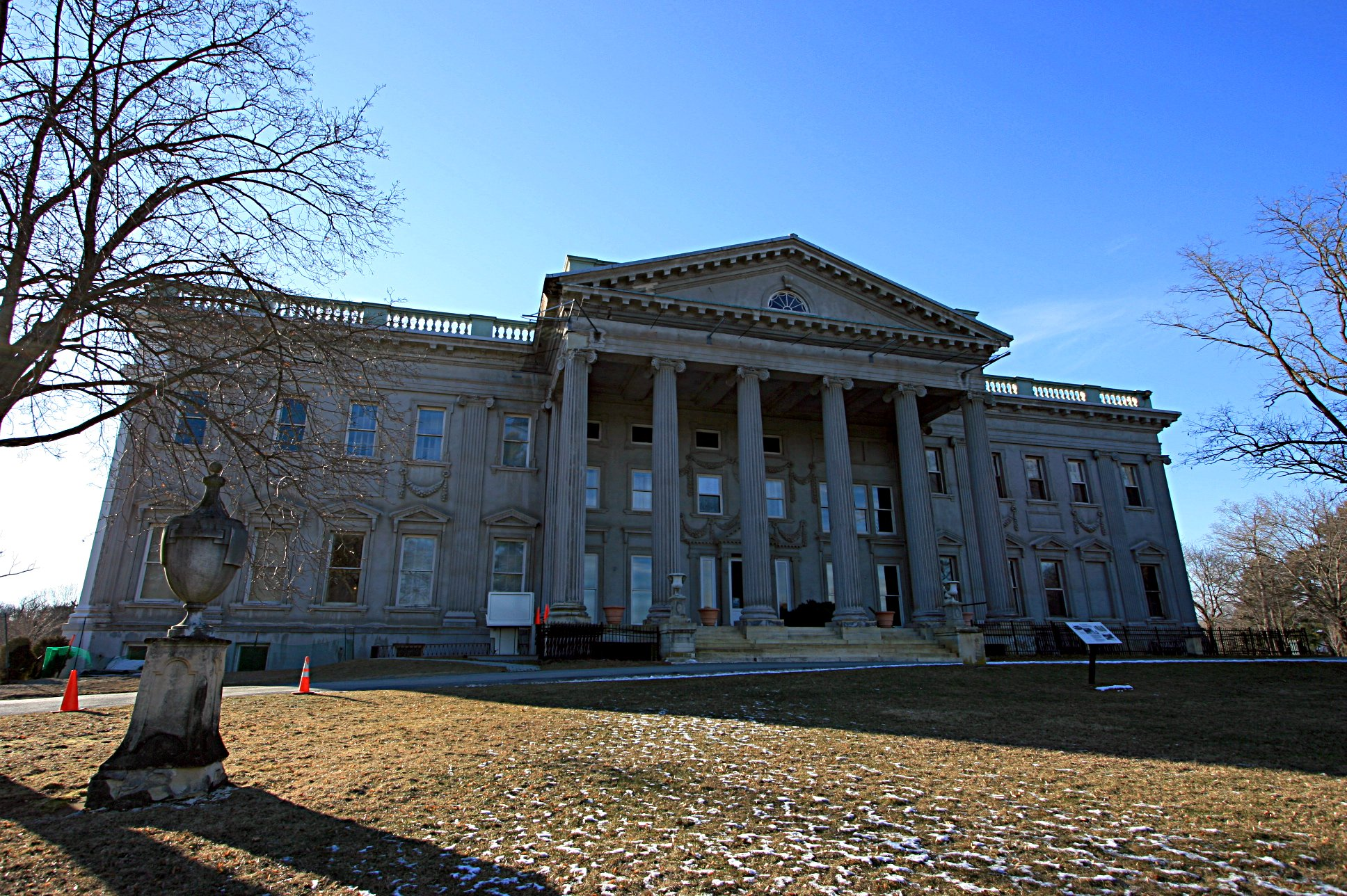
Mill's mansion in Staatsburg, New York.

- Staatsburgh State Historic Site (also owned by Mills)
