= Archibald Rogers Estate =

Historic house in New York, United States

- U.S. National Register of Historic Places
- Location within New York Location within the United States
- Location: Jct. of Mansion and Garden Sts., Hyde Park, New York
- Coordinates: 41°46′46″N 73°56′22″W
- Area: 68 acres (28 ha)
- Built: 1886
- Architect: Richard Morris Hunt
- Architectural style: Renaissance, Chateauesque
- NRHP reference No.: 93000864
- Added to NRHP: September 2, 1993

Archibald Rogers Estate, also known as "Crumwold," is a historic mansion located at Hyde Park in Dutchess County, New York. It was designed by noted New York architect Richard Morris Hunt. The house is currently owned by the Millennial Kingdom Family Church, a Christian group.

On January 1,2026 the Crumwold Castle suffered a devastating fire of unknown origin.

== History ==
In 1842 the land was owned by Elias Butler who gave the place the name "Crumwold". The Miller and Hoffman families resided on a portion of this property. Archibald Rogers purchased it in 1889.

In his book "Colonel Archibald Rogers And the Crumwold Estate" author Carney Rhinevault, Hyde Park Town Historian, provides the following details. Crumwold Hall was occupied by the 306 Military Police from 1942 to 1945, as they protected President Roosevelt, who lived next door. When the President died in 1945, the MP's were transferred to the coach house at the Vanderbilt mansion to guard the President's grave. In 1947, Daniel Trosky purchased the mansion and sold part of the estate to provide the money needed to begin building homes on quarter-acre lots. In 1948, Trosky attempted to create the FDR school at Crumwold Hall, but that effort lasted only a couple of years. The school continued to exist when, in 1952, due to space problems it was moved to Shippan Point in Stamford CT. The school remained open and successful until 1984. In 1948, Trosky sold about 900 acres and thirteen outbuildings to John Watson Golden and his partners, and construction on what became known as Crumwold Acres began.

In 1951, the building was purchased by the Catholic Church and Eymard Seminary High School was formed. In the 1970s, the Catholic Church decided to sell Eymard Seminary (Crumwold Hall). The property was purchased by J. Homer Butler.

== Description ==
It is a three-story dwelling constructed of coursed Maine granite with sandstone trim in the Chateauesque style. It is topped by a hipped roof and has eight stone chimneys and a center parapet. It features three towers, two with conical roofs and the third with a pyramidal roof. Also on the property are a carriage house and cottage.

The Crumwold Estate exists today, but instead of supporting only one family in Victorian grandeur, over 500 families, mostly in their own single-family homes, now live on Crumwold lands. Crumwold Hall is today owned by an ecumenical religious group called the Millennial Kingdom Family Church, which purchased the building and 69 acres from J. Homer Butler in 1983.

It was added to the National Register of Historic Places in 1993.
