= Stuyvesant Apartments =

Former apartment building in Manhattan, New York

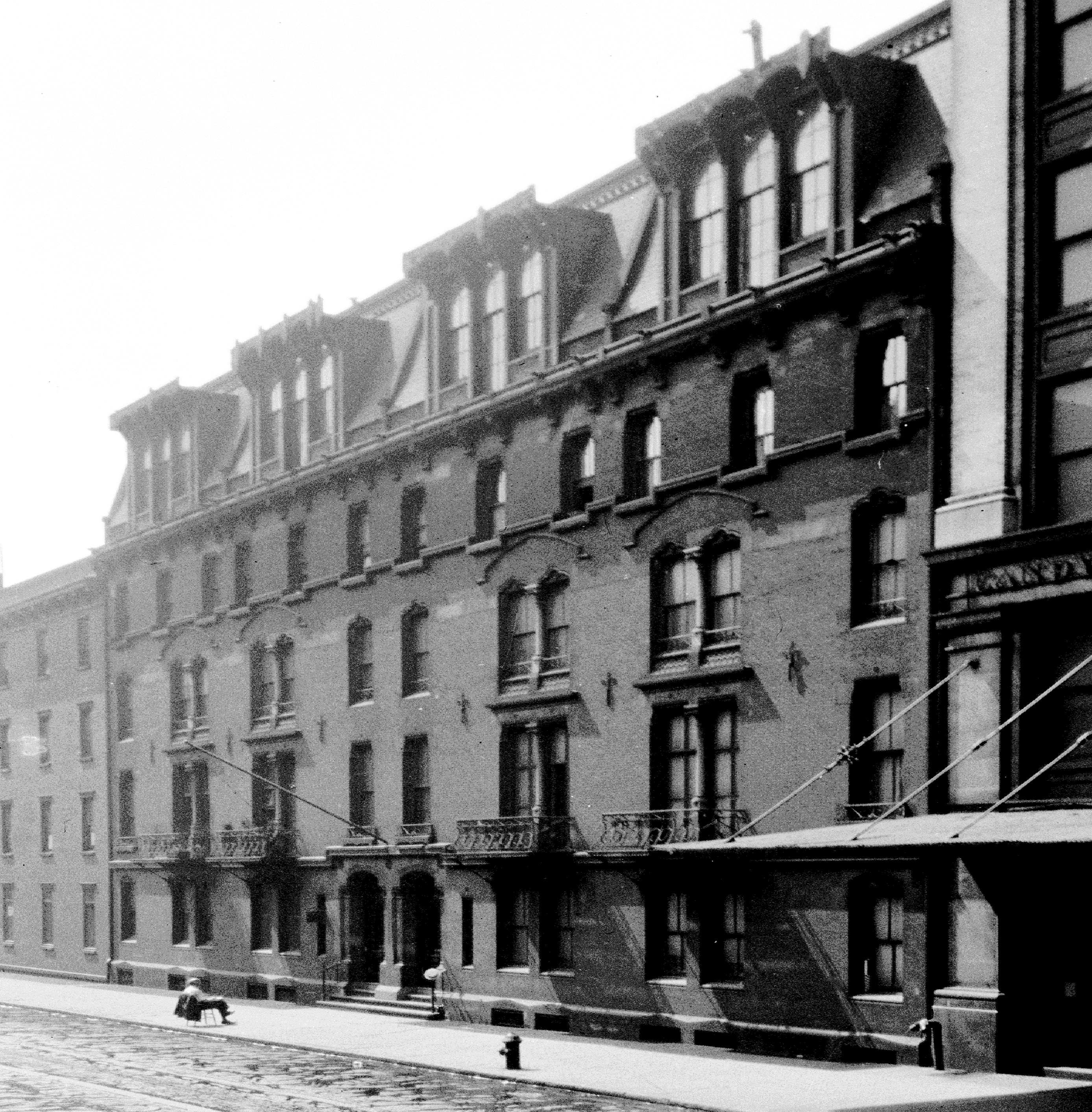
- (1934)
- Alternative names: The Stuyvesant

General information
- Status: Demolished
- Architectural style: Victorian Gothic
- Location: Manhattan, New York, 142 East 18th Street, U.S.
- Coordinates: 40°44′10″N 73°59′10″W
- Construction started: 1869
- Completed: 1870
- Demolished: Prior to 1960
- Cost: $100,000

Technical details
- Floor count: 5

Design and construction
- Architect: Richard Morris Hunt

The Stuyvesant Apartments, Stuyvesant Flats, Rutherfurd Stuyvesant Flats or simply The Stuyvesant, was an apartment building located at 142 East 18th Street between Irving Place and Third Avenue in the Gramercy Park neighborhood of Manhattan in New York City. It is considered to be the first apartment building in the city intended for the middle class, who previously were not used to living in apartments, which were initially called "French flats" at the time.

Before the Stuyvesant, almost all of the housing in New York City consisted of either tenements or townhouses. The Stuyvesant helped to bridge this gap, satisfying the need for higher density but upscale housing. Rents ranged from $1,000 to $1,800 per year, the rough equivalents in 2015 of approximately $8,000 to $14,000 per year.

The Stuyvesant was successful, leading the way for other such buildings to be constructed. In their book New York 1880, Robert A. M. Stern and his co-authors wrote that the Stuyvesant was the "foundation stone" of the movement of the middle-class into apartments.

== Development ==
The Stuyvesant was developed by Rutherfurd Stuyvesant. Despite his name, Stuyvesant was not a direct descendant of Peter Stuyvesant, one of the directors of New Amsterdam, but was related through his mother. Born "Stuyvesant Rutherfurd", he changed his name to satisfy the 1847 will of Peter Gerard Stuyvesant, which required that the boy adopt the surname "Stuyvesant" in order to inherit the estate. This was solved by a name reversal, and so in 1863, when he was 21, "Stuyvesant Rutherfurd" became "Rutherfurd Stuyvesant". While in Paris, Stuyvesant admired the French apartment buildings, and decided to build one in New York City. He was 27 years old at the time.

The apartments were built in 1869–70 at the cost of $100,000, and were designed by noted architect Richard Morris Hunt in the Victorian Gothic style. Stuyvesant had met Hunt in Paris, and considered him to be the best architect for the project. Not only had he studied at the École des Beaux-Arts in Paris, but he also understood what had been required for middle class Parisians to accept apartment living.

The building opened in 1870, and was a success, attracting many young couples of impeccable reputation. All the apartments were rented before the building was finished, and many applicants were turned away. The following year saw construction of the Hunt-designed Stephens Apartments, later converted into the Victoria Hotel, which were aimed at wealthier clients.

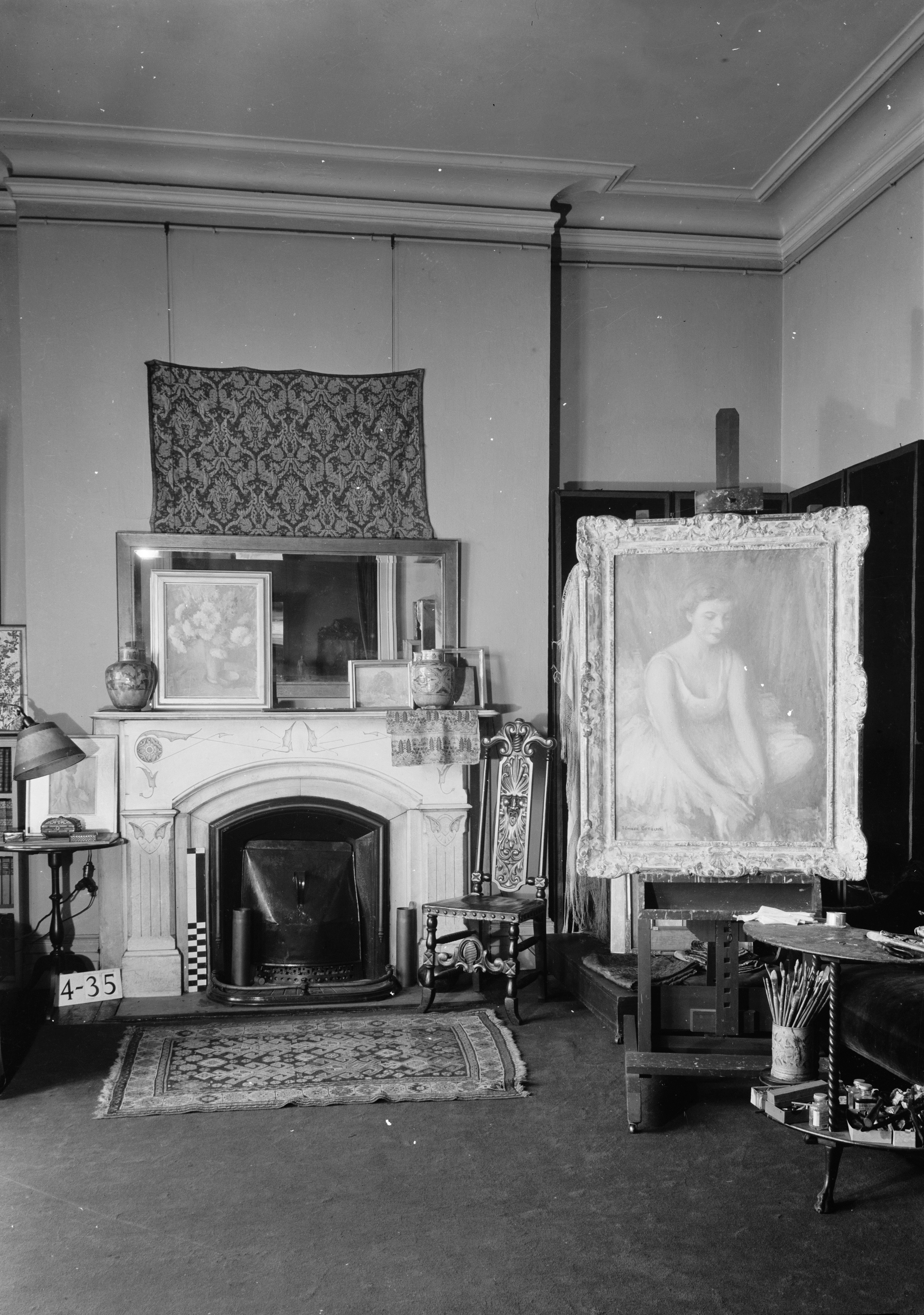
Bedroom, with Edmund Greacen's painting Seated Ballerina on an easel

== Interior ==
The building contained 16 apartments plus four artists' studios. Each apartment had its own toilet. The parlor (public room) was in the front because it had the most light and occupants could look out onto the street. Behind that were bedrooms, then the dining room in the middle. The rear housed the kitchen and bathroom. Two staircases gave access to the floors, one for the occupants and a service stairwell for deliveries and servants.

The plan was experimental, being the first-middle class apartment in the city. It contained certain flaws. The corridors were dark and narrow. Visitors walking from the parlor to the dining room would have to pass the bedrooms and might be able to see into one. At the time, this would be considered objectionable. Furthermore, the kitchen and parlor were not very close together which was inconvenient for servants. The kitchen, in fact, was at the rear of each apartment, as the smell of cooking permeating a domicile was considered to be a hallmark of a tenement.

The fifth floor of the building was reserved for artists' studios.

== Exterior ==
The five-story building occupied four lots. The exterior deliberately used strong verticals to give the impression that it was actually four, separate, attached houses. It had a mansard roof with dormers. The second floor had balconies made of wrought iron. Critics of the building called the facade "rambling and incoherent".

The entire building was divided into two parts, each with a separate entrance. This was done to address the concern that the residents may not want to encounter a neighbor they did not wish to associate with. A French-style concierge was provided as one of the building's perks.

== Fire ==
The building was the site of a fire on September 7, 1884. The fire apparently started in an air shaft which terminated in the first floor apartment of Elizabeth B. Custer, the widow of General George Custer, who died at the Battle of Little Big Horn. No one was seriously injured in the fire, which spread up the air shaft to the apartments above on the second, third and fourth floors, and then to the roof.

== Demise ==
Not long after it opened, the Stuyvesant was overshadowed by newer, bigger, and more luxurious apartment buildings such as The Dakota, on the Upper West Side, built in 1884. The Stuyvesant was eventually demolished to make way for Gramercy Green, a modern apartment building, which was completed in 1960.

Rutherfurd Stuyvesant went on to develop other buildings, but he never worked with an architect of Hunt's caliber again.

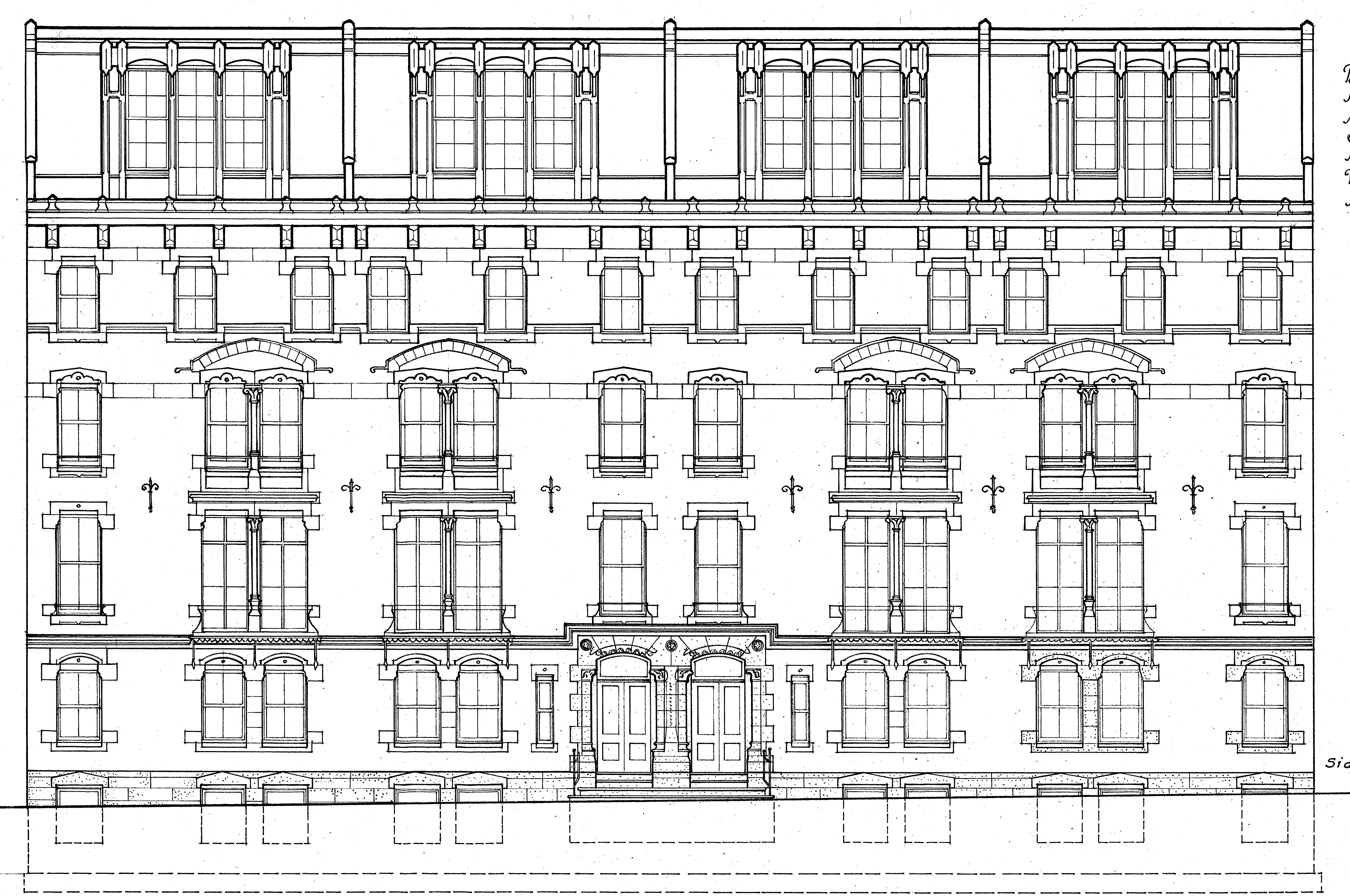
Plan of the building's north (front) elevation

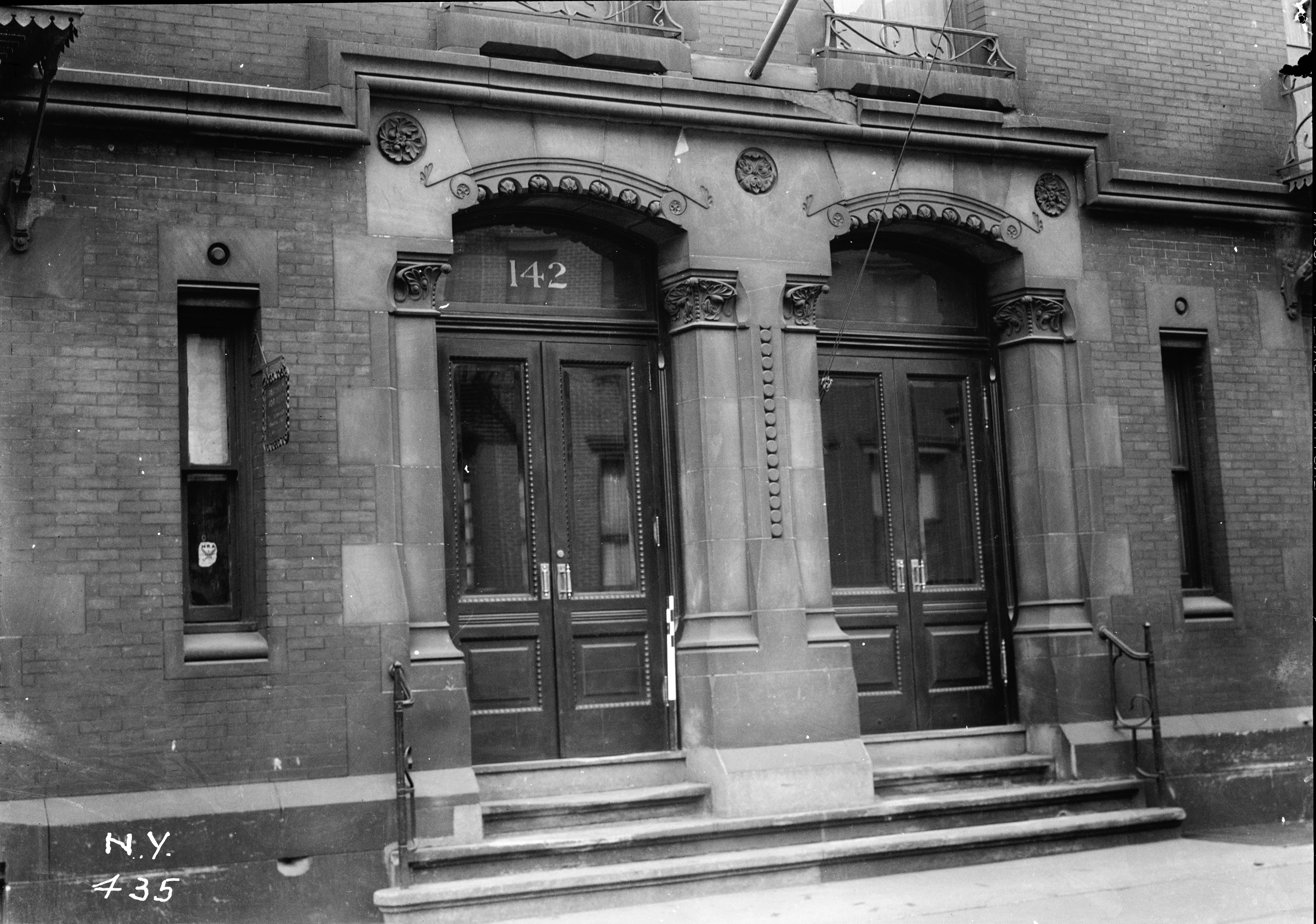
Entrance doors (1934)

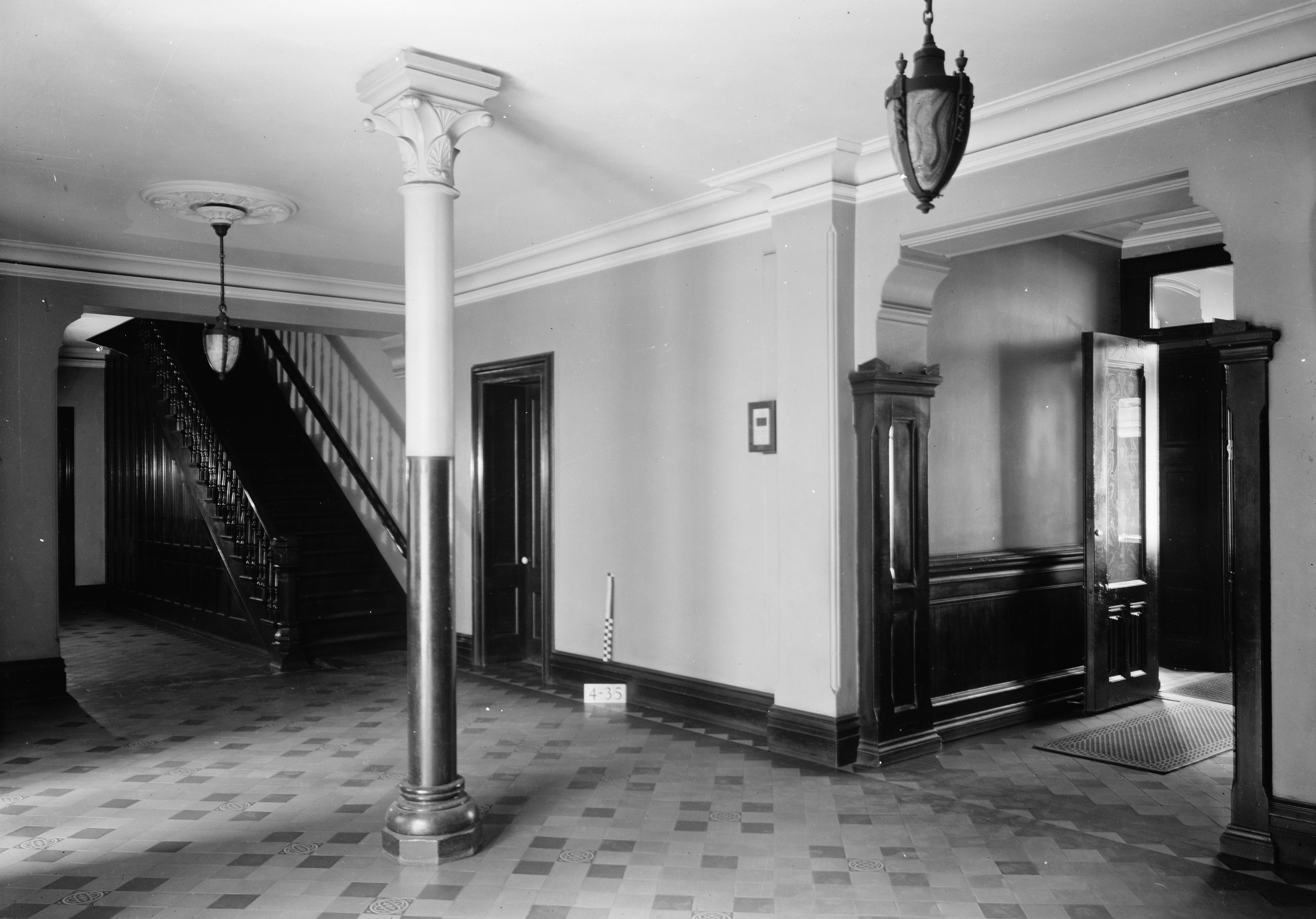
Entrance hall (1934)

== Floor plan ==
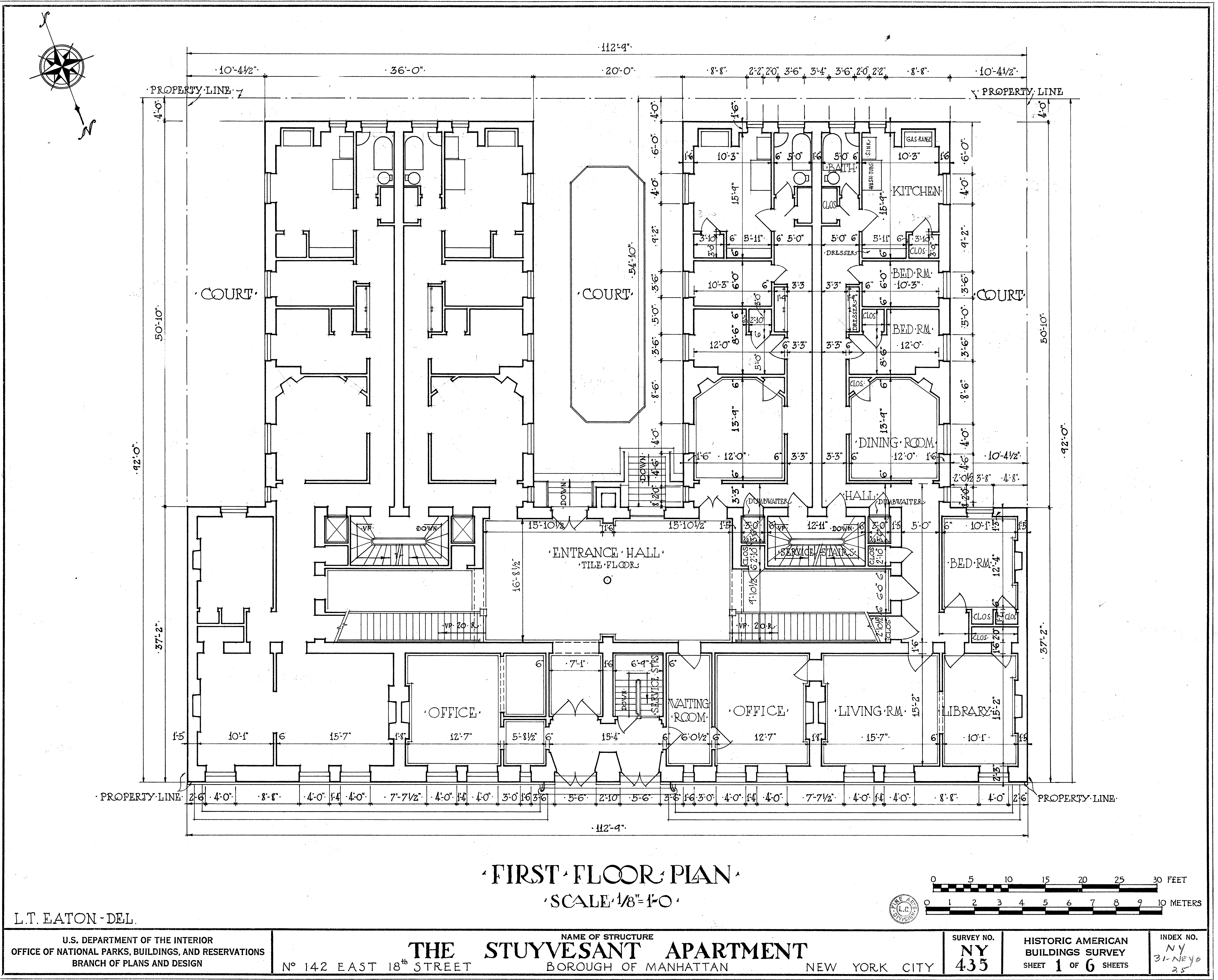

== Notable residents ==
Notable residents included:

- William Rose Benet - poet and editor
- Elizabeth B. Custer – George Custer's widow, lived on the first floor
- Joseph Gilder – editor
- Oliver Herford - artist, illustrator, and wit
- Elizabeth Jordan – editor of Harper's Bazaar from 1900 to 1913
- George Palmer Putnam – publisher for Washington Irving and Edgar Allan Poe, founder of the firm which became G. P. Putnam's Sons.
- Calvert Vaux – co-creator with Frederick Law Olmsted of Central Park and Prospect Park
- Worthington Whittredge – artist of the Hudson River School
- Peter Bonnett Wight – architect
- Elinor Wylie - poet and novelist
- Pamela Colman Smith - artist
- One of two founders of the National Rifle Association of America (Note: It is not clear which one of the two founders – William Conant Church and George Wood Wingate – lived in the Stuyvesant Apartments.)

== See also ==
- The Dakota
