= Frederick Townsend =

American general (1825–1897)

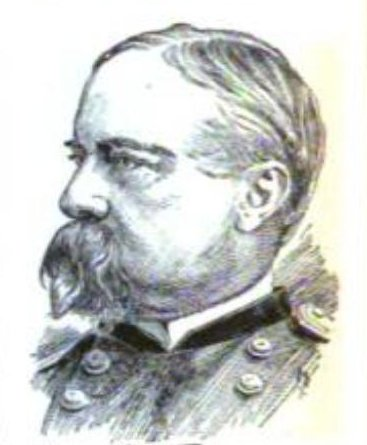
- General Frederick Townsend (1825–1897)
- Born: September 21, 1825; Albany, New York, U.S.
- Died: September 11, 1897 (aged 71); Lake Luzerne, New York, U.S.
- Burial place: Albany Rural Cemetery, Menands, New York, U.S.
- Military career
- Allegiance: United States
- Branch: United States Army; Union Army; New York State Militia
- Service years: 1857–1881
- Rank: Lieutenant Colonel; Brevet Brigadier General; Brigadier General (Militia)
- Units: 18th U.S. Infantry Regiment; 9th U.S. Infantry Regiment
- Commands: 76th New York Militia Regiment; 3rd New York Infantry Regiment
- Conflicts: American Civil War: Battle of Big Bethel; Battle of Lick Creek; Battle of Perryville; Battle of Stones River
- Other work: Adjutant General of New York

Signature of General Frederick Townsend

Frederick Townsend (September 21, 1825 – September 11, 1897) was a Union officer in the American Civil War. He founded and was Colonel of the 3rd New York Infantry Regiment, and later served with the US Army's 18th and 9th Infantry regiments, where he was brevetted a brigadier general. Townsend served three terms as Adjutant General of New York from 1857 to 1861, and again in 1880.

== Early life ==
Frederick Townsend was born in Albany, New York on September 21, 1825 to Isaiah and Hannah Townsend. He was the grandson of Solomon Townsend, a ship's captain during the American Revolution, and great-grandson of Samuel Townsend a member of the New York provincial congress and of the committee appointed to prepare a form of government for the state of New York. He descended from the immigrants Henry Townsend and Henry's brother John who immigrated to New Amsterdam from England by 1642, then moved to Warwick, RI for a decade before settling at Jamaica on Long Island NY, and by 1660/1 had moved to Oyster Bay Long Island.

Townsend had 6 brothers and 3 sisters. There was a strong military bent in the family, as one brother, Franklin Townsend was Adjutant General of New York from 1869 to 1873 and 1875 to 1879, and another, Robert served in the U.S. Navy, both on the side of the Union. His sister Mary, on the other hand, married General William H.T. Walker of the Confederate Army.

Frederick attended The Albany Academy and Bartlett Collegiate School at Poughkeepsie, New York and was graduated from Union College, which he entered at age 15, with an A.B. degree in 1844. He studied law under John V. L. Pruyn and was admitted to the bar in 1849 and practiced in Albany.

That year gold was discovered in California. Townsend was equipped by his grandmother with equipment and an aide to seek his fortune on the Pacific coast. After being given up for dead following a long period of no news, Frederick returned to Albany with tales of being captured by Indians and surviving a tornado. He also carried a single nugget of the precious metal which he gave his grandmother who preserved it as a family treasure.

== Military career ==
Returning home he was made captain of Company B of the Washington Continentals of Albany. He organized the 76th regiment of militia of which he was colonel, and later on the Albany Zouave cadets.

He was appointed by Governor John Alsop King in 1857 to succeed Robert H. Pruyn as Adjutant General of New York, leading Townsend to end his law practice. Finding the militia to be less than it should be, he significantly reordered it. He prepared an annual report to the legislature from this department for the first time. Additionally he improved the conditions of the citizen soldiers and increased their numbers to 12,000 effective men. Townsend's efforts were recognized as effective and he was reappointed by the next governor of the state, Governor Edwin D. Morgan in 1859.

In 1861, he organized the 3rd New York Volunteer Infantry Regiment of which he was commissioned colonel and which he led in the Battle of Big Bethel on June 10, 1861. Townsend's unit suffered 21 wounded from friendly fire when the 7th New York Volunteer Infantry Regiment mistook them for Confederates and opened fire. He was appointed by President Abraham Lincoln major in the 18th U.S. Infantry on August 19, 1861, and served under Generals Don Carlos Buell and William Rosecrans. Townsend took part in the Battle of Lick Creek, Mississippi, where he led the battalion in reconnaissance. On April 30 he took part in the Siege of Corinth and in the Battle of Perryville, Kentucky on October 8, 1862, which has been called one of the bloodiest of the Civil War given the number of soldiers engaged.

At the Battle of Stones River on December 31, 1862, with all the senior officers of the regular brigade having been shot except the brigade commander, Townsend was placed in command of the left wing of the brigade. The loss of his brigade in the fight was 94 killed 497 wounded and 50 missing.

Townsend was then brevetted lieutenant colonel, colonel, and brigadier general in the regular Army. In 1863, he was posted to duty as acting assistant provost marshal general at Albany. On April 20, 1864, he was promoted to lieutenant colonel. In 1867 after a leave of absence in Europe, he was made acting assistant inspector general of the department of California from which he inspected all the government posts in Arizona. He resigned his commission in 1868 and returned to Albany. In 1875, he was again appointed adjutant general; he served until 1879 and was succeeded by John B. Woodward.

He was appointed brigadier general of 9th Brigade of the state militia in 1878 and adjutant general of the state in 1880 under Gov. Alonzo B. Cornell. As part of a commission to revise the military code in the state, Townsend undertook to restructure the state forces, resulting in a disbanding of a number of regiments, including his former command, the 9th Brigade, accompanied by a downsizing of the officer corps. Along with the painful downsizing and restructuring of the militia, he successfully urged the adoption of a state service uniform and a state military camp, which later came to be named Camp Townsend, (now Camp Smith) in Peekskill. He was succeeded by John G. Farnsworth.

== Other activities ==
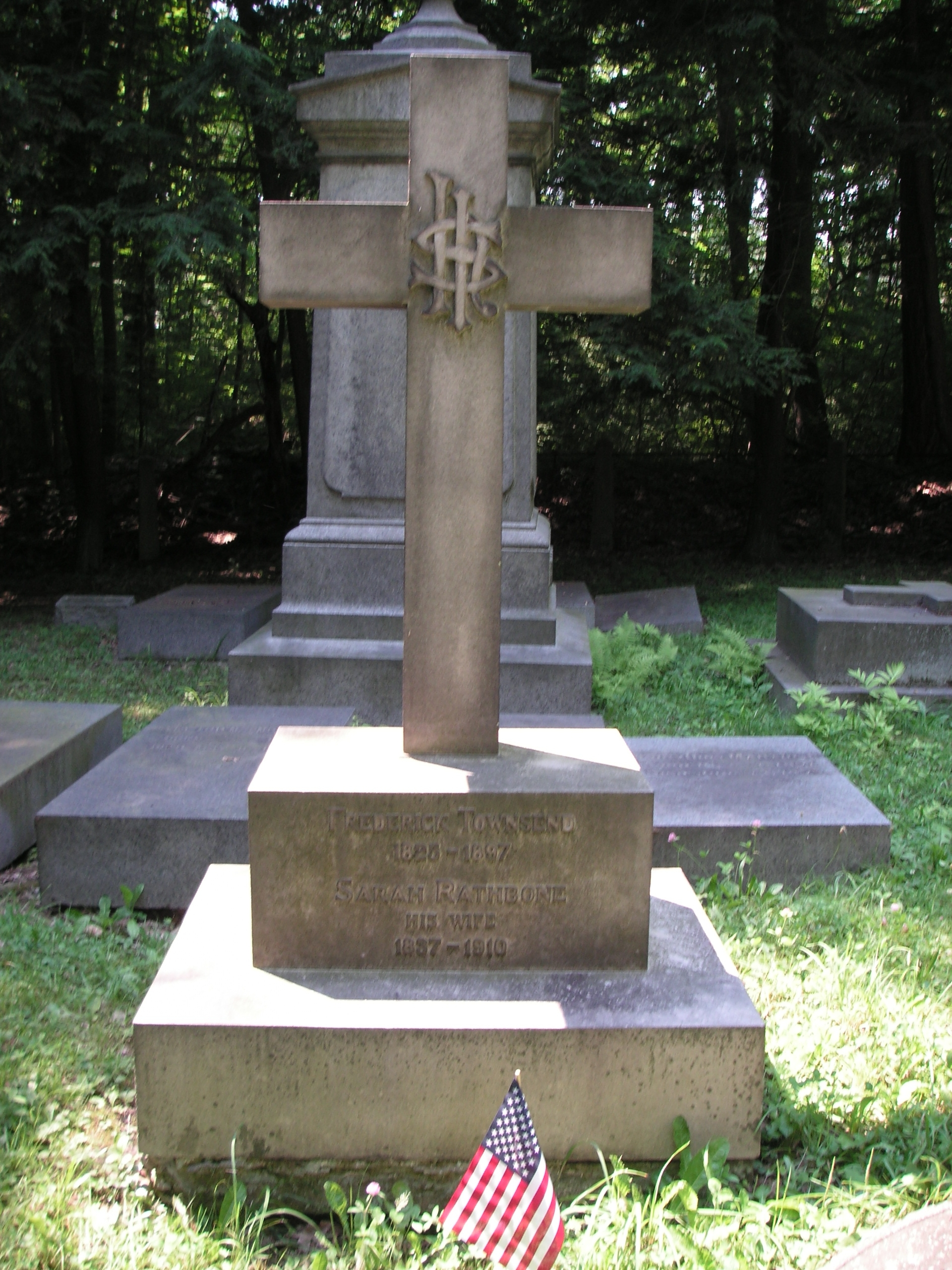
Grave of Frederick Townsend at the Albany Rural Cemetery

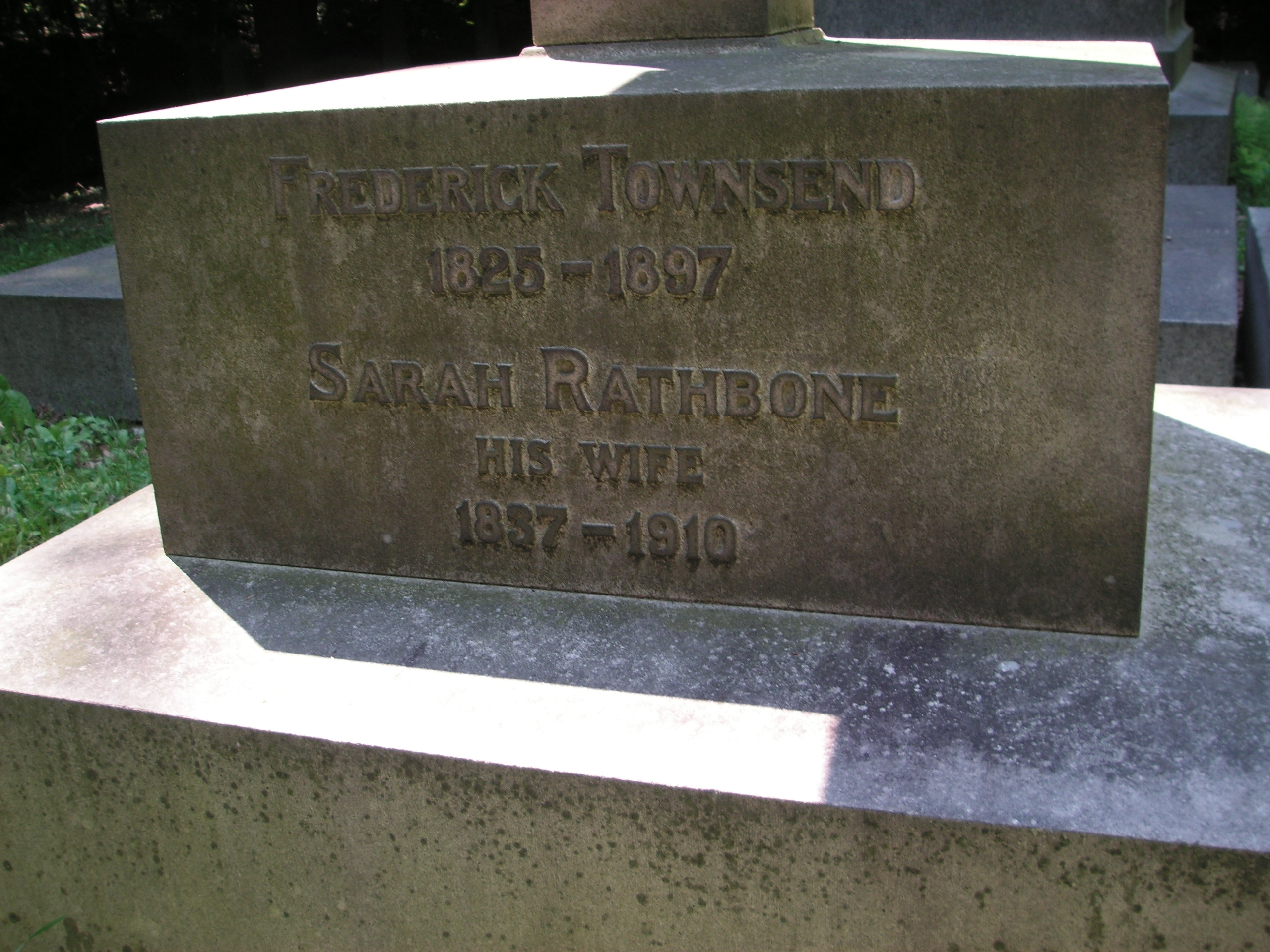
Detail of Townsend's grave

Townsend was a member of a number of military organizations including:

- The Society of the Army of the Cumberland
- The Grand Army of the Republic
- The Military Order of the Loyal Legion of the United States

He was nominated by the 1880 Republican state convention to serve as a presidential elector, and he cast his vote for James A. Garfield on November 9, 1880.

== Directorships ==
Gen Townsend has been a director of:

- Trustee of Vassar College
- New York National Bank
- Albany & Bethlehem Turnpike Company
- Albany Orphan Asylum
- Dudley Observatory
- The Albany Academy

== Family ==
In 1863, Townsend married Sarah Rathbone of Albany on 19 November 1863. Together they had children:

- Annie Martin Townsend (1866–1881) died at age 15
- Sarah Rathbone Townsend (1868-1930) married Gerrit Yates Lansing
- Frederick Townsend (1871–1949) President of Albany Savings Bank
- Joel Rathbone Townsend (1879-1879)

== Death ==
Townsend died from lung disease at the Wayside Inn in Lake Luzerne, New York on September 11, 1897, and is buried at the Albany Rural Cemetery.
