= John Trout Greble =

American military officer (1834–1861)

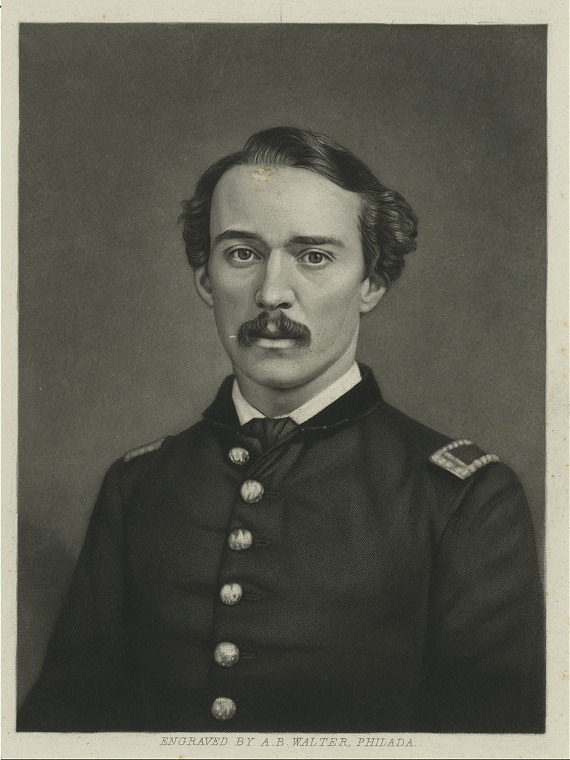
- Lt. John Trout Greble
- Born: January 19, 1834; Philadelphia, Pennsylvania, U.S.
- Died: June 10, 1861 (aged 27); Bethel Manor, Virginia, U.S.
- Burial place: West Laurel Hill Cemetery, Bala Cynwyd, Pennsylvania, U.S.
- Relatives: Edwin St. John Greble (son)
- Military career
- Branch: United States Army: Union Army
- Service years: 1854–1861
- Rank: First lieutenant
- Unit: 2nd U.S. Artillery Regiment
- Conflicts: Third Seminole War; American Civil War: Battle of Big Bethel †

John Trout Greble (January 19, 1834 – June 10, 1861) was an American military officer who served in the Union army during the American Civil War. He graduated from the United States Military Academy and served in the United States Army during the Third Seminole War. He was killed in action at the Battle of Big Bethel, and was the first Regular Army officer and graduate of the United States Military Academy killed in the American Civil War.

== Early life and education ==
He was born January 19, 1834, in Philadelphia to Edwin Greble and Susan Virginia Major. He was educated at the Ringgold grammar school and graduated from Central High School with a B.A. degree in 1850 and a M.A. degree in 1854. He was accepted into the United States Military Academy in 1850 and graduated in 1854.

== Career ==
He was assigned to the 2nd artillery, and stationed at Newport, Kentucky. In September 1854 he was made second lieutenant and deployed to Tampa, Florida, where he served in the Third Seminole War for two years. He returned home on sick leave due to severe fever and resumed his duties at the beginning of 1856. He served as quartermaster and commissary until December 1856. He was promoted to first lieutenant on March 3, 1857. He was appointed acting assistant professor of geography, history, and ethics at the United States Military Academy, and served in that role until September 24, 1860.

He was detailed for active duty at Fort Monroe in late 1860, and helped prevent its capture by Confederates. On May 26, 1861, he was sent to Newport News as master of ordnance, supervised the fortifications, and trained the volunteers in artillery practice. When the expedition to Big Bethel was planned, he was detailed to accompany it along with two guns and ten men. He communicated that he believed the movement was poorly planned and would not be successful.

When the Union army troops were repelled, he placed his guns in the middle of the road and fired to prevent pursuit by the enemy. He was advised by another officer to retreat, and he was quoted as saying, "I never dodge, and when the retreat is sounded I will leave and not before." Just at the close of the action, when he had given the orders to withdraw his guns from the field, he was struck by a glancing cannon shot on the right temple and died almost instantly. For his bravery in the two days' action, he was brevetted captain, major, and lieutenant colonel, on the day of his death.

Greble was the first Regular Army officer and United States Military Academy graduate killed in the American Civil War.

He was initially interred in Woodlands Cemetery, and was reinterred in West Laurel Hill Cemetery in Bala Cynwyd, Pennsylvania.

== Legacy ==
Two U.S. Army forts were named for him; Fort Greble in the defenses of Washington, DC in 1861 and Fort Greble on Dutch Island, Rhode Island, in the 1890s.

A society of the Odd Fellows in Hampton, Virginia, named their order the Greble Lodge in his honor.

In 1961, United States Military Academy graduates stationed at Fort Monroe erected a plaque in honor of Greble.

== Personal life ==
He married Sarah Bradley French on August 4, 1858. She was the daughter of United States Military Academy professor John W. French. Together they had two children including Edwin St. John Greble, who became a major general in the U.S. Army.
