= Edwin St. John Greble =

United States Army general (1859–1931)

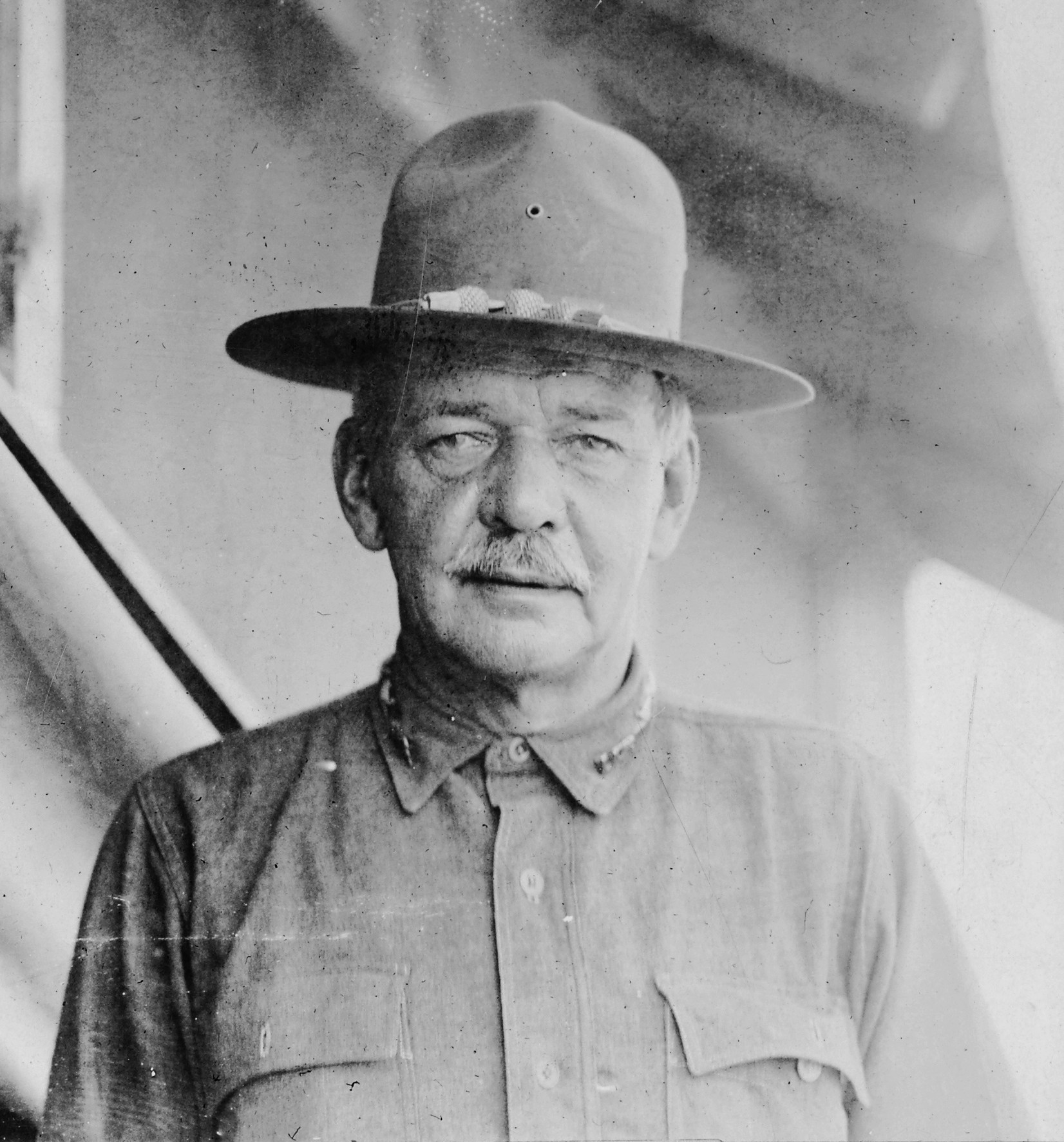
- National Archives photo of Greble as a major general during World War I
- Born: June 24, 1859; West Point, New York, U.S.
- Died: September 30, 1931 (aged 72); West Orange, New Jersey, U.S.
- Burial place: Arlington National Cemetery
- Spouse: Gertrude Poland
- Children: 3
- Relatives: John Trout Greble (father); John S. Poland (father-in-law)
- Military career
- Allegiance: United States
- Branch: United States Army
- Service years: 1881–1918
- Rank: Major General
- Service number: 0-13118
- Unit: U.S. Army Field Artillery Branch
- Commands: Battery F, 2nd Field Artillery Regiment; 6th Field Artillery Regiment; 36th Infantry Division
- Conflicts: Spanish–American War; Mexican Border War; World War I

Edwin St. John Greble (June 24, 1859 – September 30, 1931) was a United States Army officer in the late 19th and early 20th centuries. He served in several conflicts, including the Spanish–American War and World War I.

== Biography ==
Greble was born at West Point on June 24, 1859. When he was two, his father First Lieutenant John Trout Greble was killed in the Battle of Big Bethel during the American Civil War, the first graduate of the United States Military Academy to die in battle during the conflict. The younger Greble graduated sixth in a class of 53 cadets from the United States Military Academy in 1881.

Greble was commissioned into the Second Artillery, and he subsequently served in the field artillery. He graduated from the Infantry and Cavalry School in 1884, and from the Coast Artillery School at Fort Monroe in 1892. Greble served as an aide to Oliver Otis Howard from 1885 to 1889. He participated in the Spanish–American War, serving in Cuba from 1898 to 1900. After serving as the Adjutant General of the Second Division, he was the assistant Adjutant General of the Department of Havana. He also organized the Department of Charities and oversaw the evacuation of buildings by the Spanish.

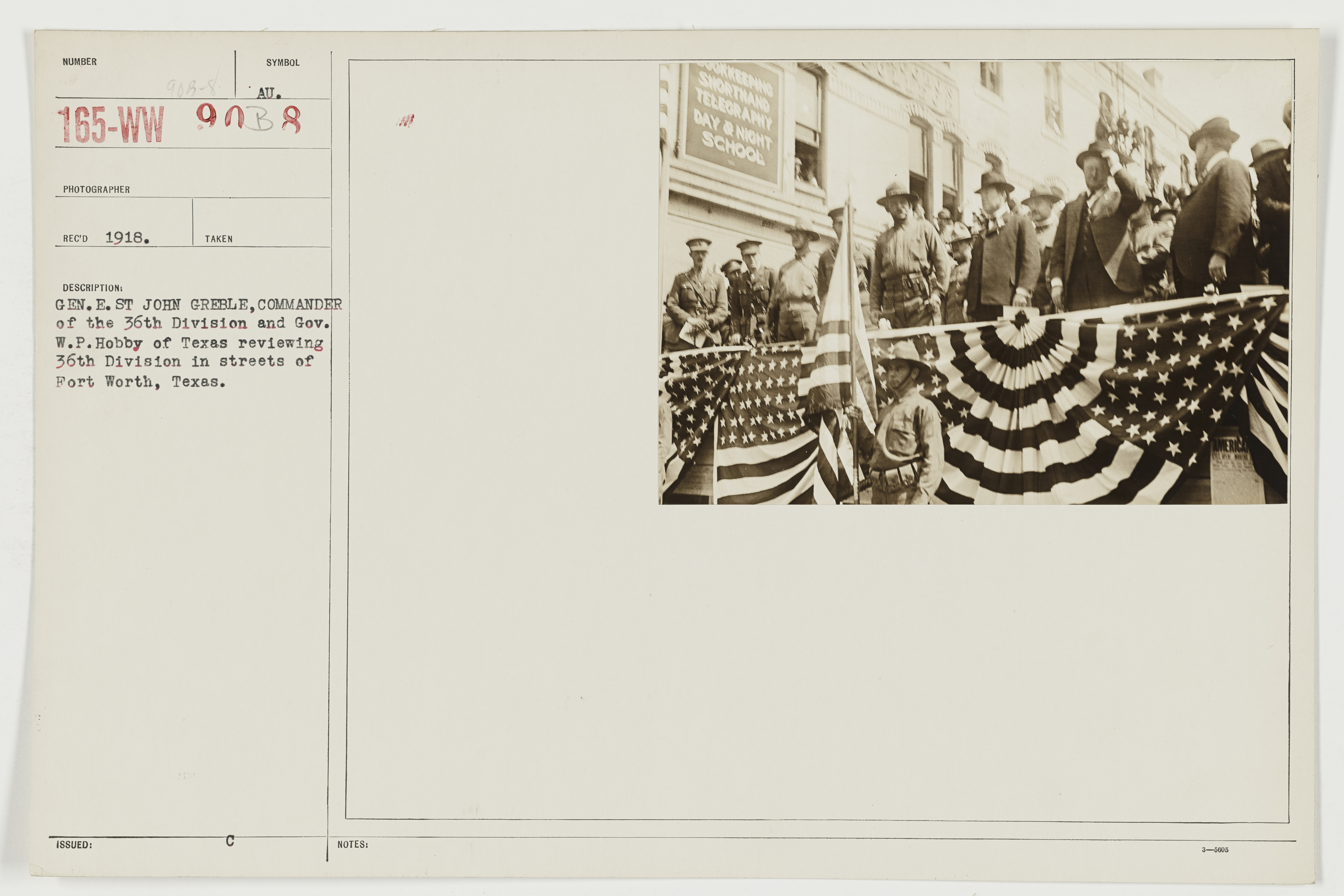

Greble taught in West point's Tactics Department from 1901 to 1904. He returned to Cuba in 1906 as part of the Second Occupation of Cuba, remaining there until 1909. He worked as the supervisor of the Secretary of the interior during this time. Greble served on the General Staff in 1910, and he was on the border with Mexico between September 13, 1914, and August 22, 1917.

Greble was promoted to the rank of brigadier general on October 13, 1916, and to major general on August 5, 1917. From August 25 to September 18, 1917, and again from December 6, 1917, to July 8, 1918, he commanded the 36th Infantry Division. Because of disabilities he developed on the line of duty, Greble retired in October 1918.

Greble lived in Washington, D.C., as a retiree. He died in West Orange, New Jersey on September 30, 1931. He is buried at Arlington National Cemetery.

== Personal life ==
Greble married Gertrude Poland, the daughter of Brigadier General John S. Poland, on June 24, 1885.
