= Henry Lawson Wyatt =

First Confederate soldier from North Carolina to die during the American Civil War

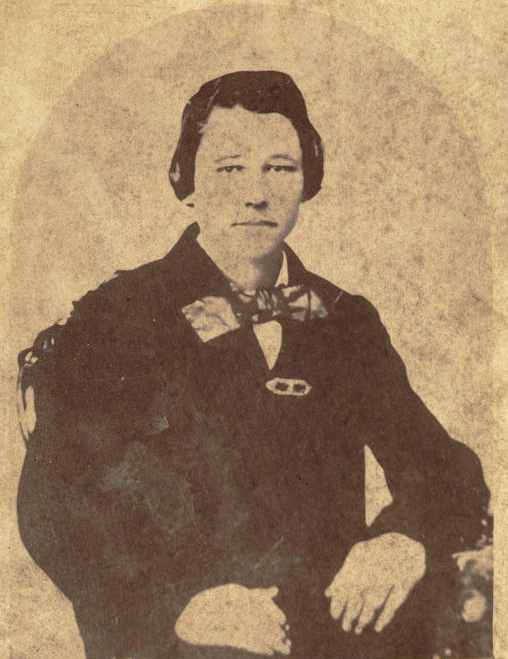
- Born: February 12, 1842; Richmond, Virginia
- Died: June 10, 1861 (aged 19); Newport News, Virginia
- Military career
- Allegiance: Confederate States of America
- Branch: Confederate States Army
- Service years: 1861
- Unit: Edgecombe Guards
- Conflicts: Battle of Big Bethel
- Memorials: Statue of Henry Lawson Wyatt

Henry Lawson Wyatt (February 12, 1842 – June 10, 1861), was a Confederate soldier during the American Civil War. He died in the Battle of Big Bethel, one of the first skirmishes of the war, making him the first enlisted soldier from North Carolina to die in battle.

== Early years ==
Wyatt was born in Richmond, Virginia to Isham Belcher and Lucinda N. L. Wyatt. He grew up learning carpentry as a trade, and as a child accompanied his father to North Carolina where he would later settle in Tarboro in October, 1856.

== American Civil War ==
In early April, 1861, North Carolina was preparing to secede from the United States. A local militia was organized on April 18 of that year called the Edgecombe Guards, and Wyatt was one of its first enlistees. This company became designated as "Company A" and was placed in the 1st North Carolina Volunteers (later the 11th North Carolina Infantry Regiment).

On June 10, 1861, Wyatt's regiment took part in the Battle of Big Bethel. During the battle, Wyatt and four others volunteered to set fire to a nearby barn which was thought to be aiding Union soldiers. As he crossed a field with the other soldiers a volley struck him down midway, and he was noticed to have a clot of blood on his forehead "as large as a man's fist." His fellow soldiers, who were not hit, quickly carried Wyatt off the field to a hospital in Yorktown. He died the following morning. His body was brought by train to Richmond, Virginia and interred in Hollywood Cemetery.

== Legacy ==
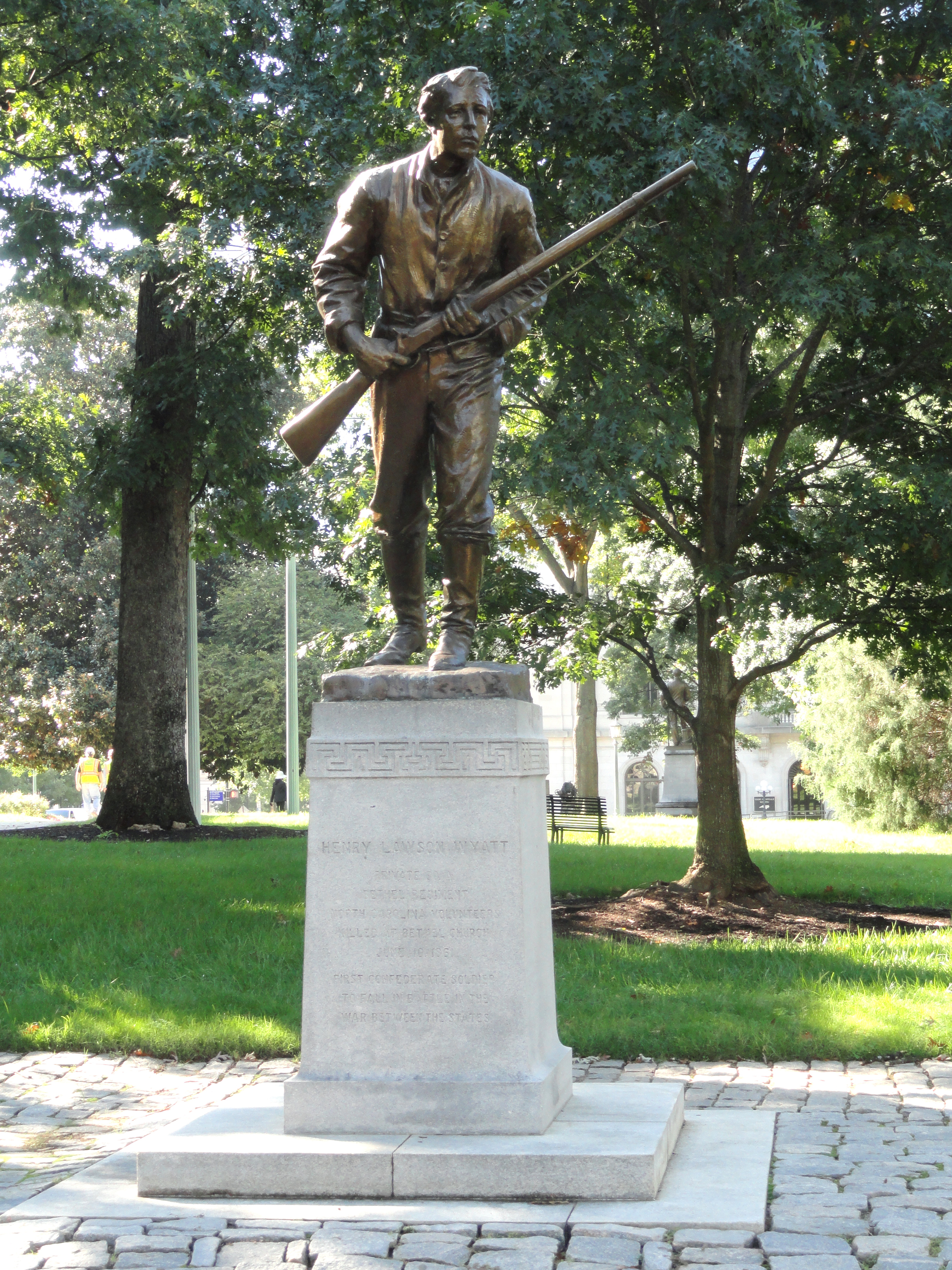
The statue of Wyatt in Union Square in 2011

While Wyatt was the first soldier from North Carolina to die during the Civil War, he was not the first Confederate soldier to be killed in battle, despite being lauded as such by some authors. That distinction goes to Captain John Quincy Marr, an officer who was killed at the Battle of Fairfax Court House (June 1861) on June 1, 1861. However, Wyatt can be claimed to be the first enlisted soldier to die in battle if the distinction is made between first enlisted soldier and first officer.

On June 10, 1912, the 51st anniversary of the Battle of Bethel, the North Carolina division of the United Daughters of the Confederacy unveiled a statue of Wyatt in Raleigh, North Carolina. The statue was removed on June 20, 2020, after North Carolina governor Roy Cooper ordered the removal of all Confederate monuments at the state capitol.
