= Statue of Henry Lawson Wyatt =

Former monument in Raleigh, North Carolina

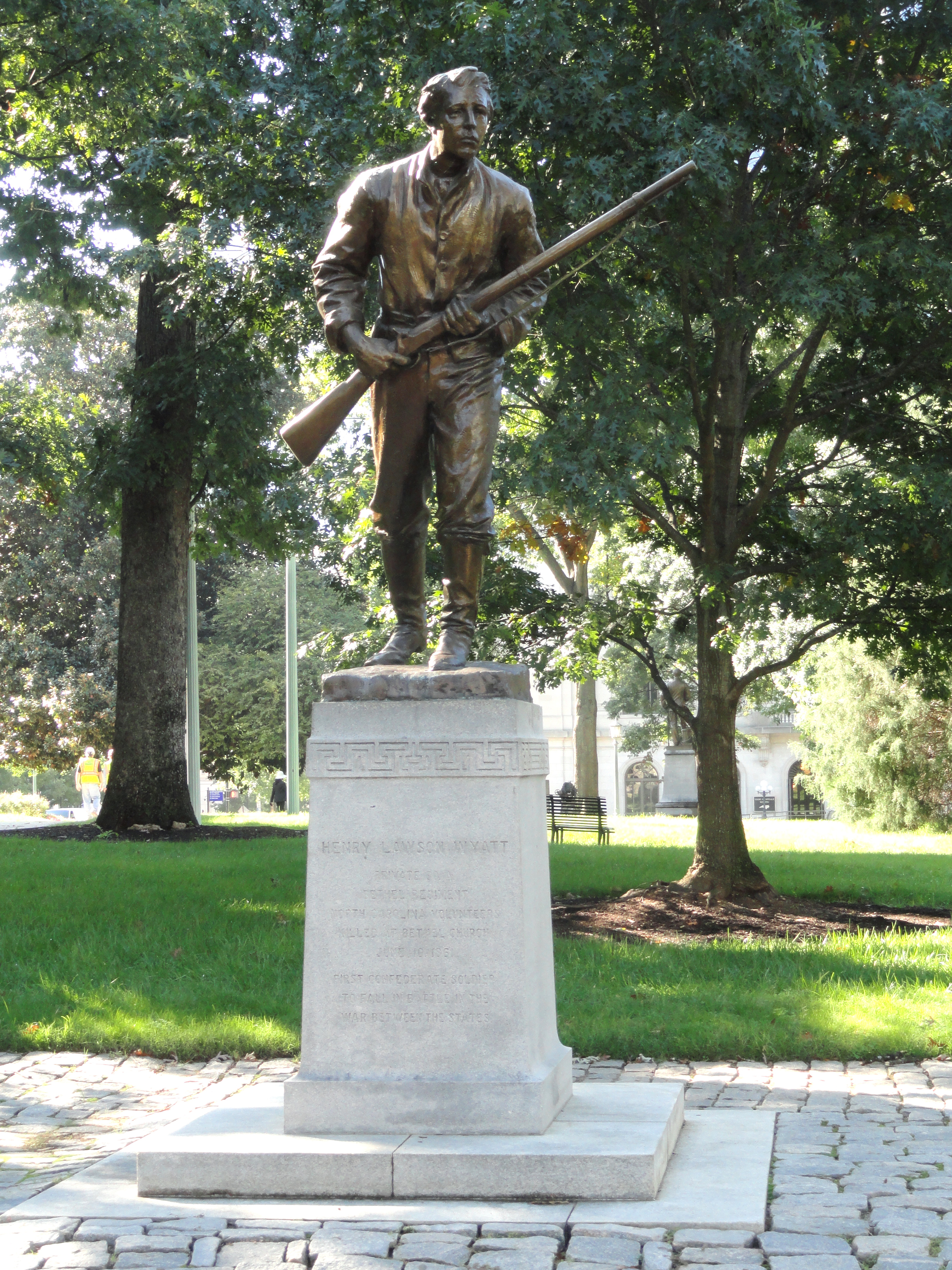
- The memorial in 2011
- Interactive map of Statue of Henry Lawson Wyatt
- Location: Raleigh, North Carolina, U.S.
- Coordinates: 35°46′51″N 78°38′22″W
- Designer: Gutzon Borglum
- Material: Bronze
- Dedicated date: June 12, 1912
- Restored date: 2008
- Dedicated to: Henry Lawson Wyatt
- Dismantled date: June 2020

A statue of Henry Lawson Wyatt was installed in Raleigh, North Carolina, United States.

== History ==
The statue was unveiled on June 12, 1912 by the North Carolina division of the Daughters of the Confederacy. Henry Lawson Wyatt was the first Confederate soldier to die in battle on June 10, 1861. It became a point of pride for North Carolina Confederates, who boasted that their state had been "First at Bethel, Farthest at Gettysburg and Chickamauga, and Last at Appomattox."

== Removal ==
The statue was removed on June 20, 2020, after North Carolina governor Roy Cooper ordered the removal of all Confederate monuments at the state capitol.

== See also ==
- List of monuments and memorials removed during the George Floyd protests
