= John S. Poland =

U.S. Army general (1836–1898)

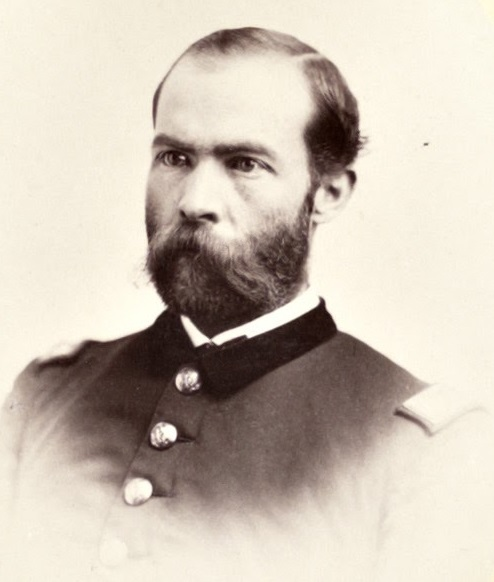
- Carte de visite photo of Poland as a captain, circa 1870
- Born: October 14, 1836; Princeton, Indiana, US
- Died: August 8, 1898 (aged 61); Asheville, North Carolina, US
- Burial place: River Bend Cemetery, Westerly, Rhode Island, US
- Spouse: Ann Brown Babcock (m. 1864–1898, his death)
- Children: 2
- Relatives: Edwin St. John Greble (son in law)
- Military career
- Allegiance: Union; United States
- Branch: Union Army; United States Army
- Service years: 1861–1865 (Union); 1865–1898 (United States)
- Rank: Brigadier General
- Unit: U.S. Army Infantry Branch
- Commands: 2nd Infantry Regiment; 17th Infantry Regiment; 2nd Provisional Brigade; 2nd Independent Division; 2nd Division, First Army Corps
- Conflicts: American Civil War; American Indian Wars; Spanish–American War

John S. Poland (October 14, 1836 – August 8, 1898) was a career officer in the United States Army. A Union Army veteran of the American Civil War, he also served in the American Indian Wars and the Spanish–American War. Poland attained the rank of brigadier general and was most notable for his command of the 17th Infantry Regiment and 2nd Division, First Army Corps.

== Early life ==
John Scroggs Poland was born in Princeton, Indiana on October 14, 1836, the son of Alfred Poland and Nancy (Finney) Poland. He was educated in the schools of Princeton and attended Princeton Seminary. In 1856, Poland began attendance at the United States Military Academy. He graduated in May 1861 ranked 34th of 45, and received his commission as a second lieutenant of Infantry.

== American Civil War ==
In May 1861, Poland was assigned to the 2nd Infantry Regiment. On July 6, 1861, he received promotion to first lieutenant. As part of the Union Army at the start of the American Civil War, Poland took part in the July 21, 1861 First Battle of Bull Run. Poland's regiment took part in the Defenses of Washington, D.C. from July 1861 to March 1862. In August 1861, Poland was assigned as regimental quartermaster. The 2nd Infantry was assigned to the Army of the Potomac for the Peninsula campaign of March to August, 1862, and Poland was a participant in the Siege of Yorktown, Battle of Gaines' Mill, and Battle of Malvern Hill. In May 1862, Poland was promoted to captain and during the Malvern Hill fight, Poland served as regimental commander.

Poland took part in the Northern Virginia campaign of August to September, 1862, including the Second Battle of Bull Run. He was active in the Maryland campaign of September to November, 1862, including the September 1862 Battle of Antietam, during which he served again as commander of the regiment, and the Battle of Shepherdstown. Poland subsequently served in the Rappahannock campaign of December 1862 to June 1863, including the Battle of Fredericksburg on December 13 to 14, 1862 and Battle of Chancellorsville on May 2 to 4, 1863. On December 13, 1862, Poland was promoted to major by brevet to recognize his heroism and superior service at Antietam, Shepardstown, and Fredericksburg. He was promoted to brevet lieutenant colonel with an effective date of May 3, 1863 to recognize his heroism at Chancellorsville.

During the Pennsylvania campaign of July to July 1863, Poland was acting inspector general of 2nd Division, III Corps Army Corps and then commissary of musters (Note: The commissary of musters was responsible for mustering in new soldiers at the start of their enlistments, mustering them out at the end of their enlistments, and providing muster rolls to the United States Department of War.) for III Corps. At the July 1863 Battle of Gettysburg, Poland served as aide-de-camp to the III Corps commander, Daniel Sickles. From September 1863 to March 1865, Poland served as commissary of musters for the Department of Washington and took part in the defense of Washington during the July 1864 raids led by Confederate general Jubal Early.

== Post-Civil War ==
After the Civil War ended, Poland was assigned to the United States Military Academy faculty. He was an assistant professor of drawing from 1865 to 1866, and principal assistant professor of geography, history, and ethics from 1866 to 1867. From 1867 to 1869 Poland served again as assistant professor of drawing.

In 1869, Poland was assigned to the 6th Infantry Regiment. He performed frontier duty at Fort Scott, Kansas from October 1869 to August 1871. This posting included temporary duty at Columbus, Kansas in November 1869 and membership on a court-martial at Fort Leavenworth, Kansas from January to July 1870. From August 1871 to August 1872, Poland served again on the West Point faculty, this time as principal assistant professor of geography, history, and ethics.

After a leave of absence during late 1872, Poland served on frontier duty at Headquarters, Department of Dakota from January to June 1873. From August 1873 to May 1875 he was posted to Fort Abraham Lincoln, Dakota Territory, and he was assigned to Standing Rock, Dakota Territory from May 1875 to September 1877. Poland served at Fort Rice, Dakota Territory from September 1877 to November 1878, and again at Fort Lincoln from November 1878 to May 1880.

In December 1880, Poland was promoted to major in the 18th Infantry. After another extended leave, in November 1881 he joined the faculty of the new School of Application of Infantry and Cavalry at Fort Leavenworth. The institution was subsequently renamed the Infantry and Cavalry School, and was the predecessor of the United States Army Command and General Staff College. Poland remained on the faculty until July 1886. In May 1886, he received promotion to lieutenant colonel in the 21st Infantry.

== American Indian Wars ==
Poland performed frontier duty with his regiment at Fort Bridger, Wyoming Territory from October 1886 to May 4, 1887. From May 1887 to November 1890 he was assigned to duty at Fort Sidney, Nebraska. In 1891, he commanded an ad hoc battalion of the 21st Infantry at the Rosebud Agency in South Dakota during the Ghost Dance War. In August 1891, he was promoted to colonel as commander of the 17th Infantry Regiment. He commanded the regiment at Fort D. A. Russell, Wyoming until September 1894. From September 1894 to April 1898, Poland commanded the 17th Infantry at Columbus Barracks, Ohio.

== Spanish–American War ==
In April 1898, Poland was assigned to command first the 2nd Provisional Brigade and then the 2nd Independent Division, units that were organized at the start of the Spanish–American War. He led his commands during their organization and training in Tampa, Florida from April to May 1898. On May 4, 1898, Poland was promoted to brigadier general of United States Volunteers. He commanded 2nd Division, First Army Corps at Chickamauga, Georgia from May to August 1898.

== Death and burial ==
Poland became ill with typhoid while in command at Chickamauga. He was treated at the hospital in Asheville, North Carolina, where he died on August 8, 1898. Poland was buried at River Bend Cemetery in Westerly, Rhode Island.

== Family ==
In 1864, Poland married Ann Brown Babcock. They were the parents of two children. Son William Babcock Poland (1868–1950) served as a first lieutenant in the Army during the Spanish–American War, became an engineer, and was associated with Herbert Hoover in directing the relief commission that provided emergency food aid to France and Belgium after World War I. Daughter Gertrude was the wife of Army major general Edwin St. John Greble.
