= Franklin Townsend =

American politician (1821–1898)

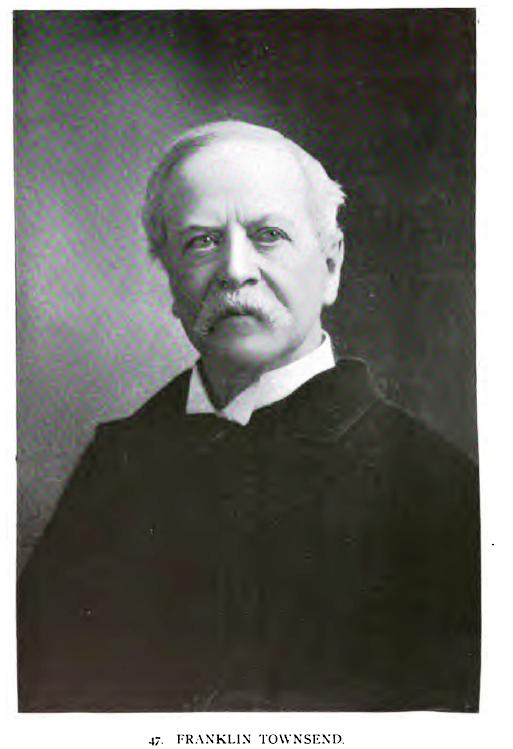
- Franklin Townsend

Mayor of Albany, New York
- In office April 16, 1850 – April 15, 1851
- Preceded by: John Taylor
- Succeeded by: Eli Perry

Alderman of Albany, New York

Assemblyman of Albany, New York

Personal details
- Born: September 28, 1821 Albany, New York, U.S.
- Died: September 11, 1898 (aged 76) Albany, New York, U.S.
- Resting place: Albany Rural Cemetery
- Party: Whig
- Spouse: Anna Josephine King
- Relations: Son of Isaiah and Hannah Townsend
- Children: Rufus King Townsend (1853-1895); Franklin Townsend (1854-1895)

Military service
- Branch/service: National Guard (Army)
- Rank: Adjutant General of New York
- Unit: New York National Guard

Franklin Townsend (1821–1898) was descended from Henry Townsend, one of the founders of Oyster Bay, New York. He was a 19th-century industrialist, active in his family's iron business which was a branch of the Stirling Iron Works, the maker of the Hudson River Chain that prevented the British Royal Navy from sailing up the Hudson River during the American Revolutionary War. He was active in Albany politics, serving as an alderman and one term as mayor. He also served as Adjutant General of New York from 1869 to 1873 and 1875 to 1879.

== Biography ==
=== Birth and family ===
Franklin Townsend was born on September 28, 1821, to Isaiah and Hannah Townsend Townsend in Albany, New York. Franklin's brothers were Howard Townsend, a prominent doctor; Frederick Townsend, a Union officer in the American Civil War; and Robert Townsend, a ship's commander in the American Civil War who lost his life while on duty in China. Townsend's maternal grandfather was Solomon Townsend, a midshipman in the Colonial United States Navy, merchant ship captain, and active in the iron business in New York State through the Augusta Forge which he established in Tuxedo, New York. His great uncle, Peter Townsend, established and ran the Stirling Iron Works which forged the Hudson River Chain which was strung across the Hudson River just south of the important American base at West Point.

On January 15, 1852, Franklin Townsend married Anna Josephine King, the daughter of Rufus H. King, a U.S. Representative from New York, and Amelia Laverty King, in Albany. They had two children:

- Rufus King Townsend (born in Albany March 18, 1853; died there December 21, 1895), who was educated at The Albany Academy and at Williams College and eventually headed his father's iron business.
- Franklin Townsend, Jr. (born in Albany on November 4, 1854; died there on October 31, 1895), who was educated at The Albany Academy and Williams College and studied at the College of Physicians and Surgeons in New York City. After graduation he received practical medical training in Germany and built his career practising medicine in Albany.

=== Iron business ===
Franklin Townsend's father, Isaiah, established his own metals business in partnership with his brother John from 1804, called "I & J Townsend". The firm produced machine castings and railcar wheels. Franklin joined the business as a young man in 1849 upon the death of his uncle John Townsend along with John's son Theodore, (Franklin's first cousin). In 1856 he became the sole proprietor, trading as "Franklin Townsend & Co." until 1871 when his older son Rufus King Townsend succeeded him.

=== Military career ===
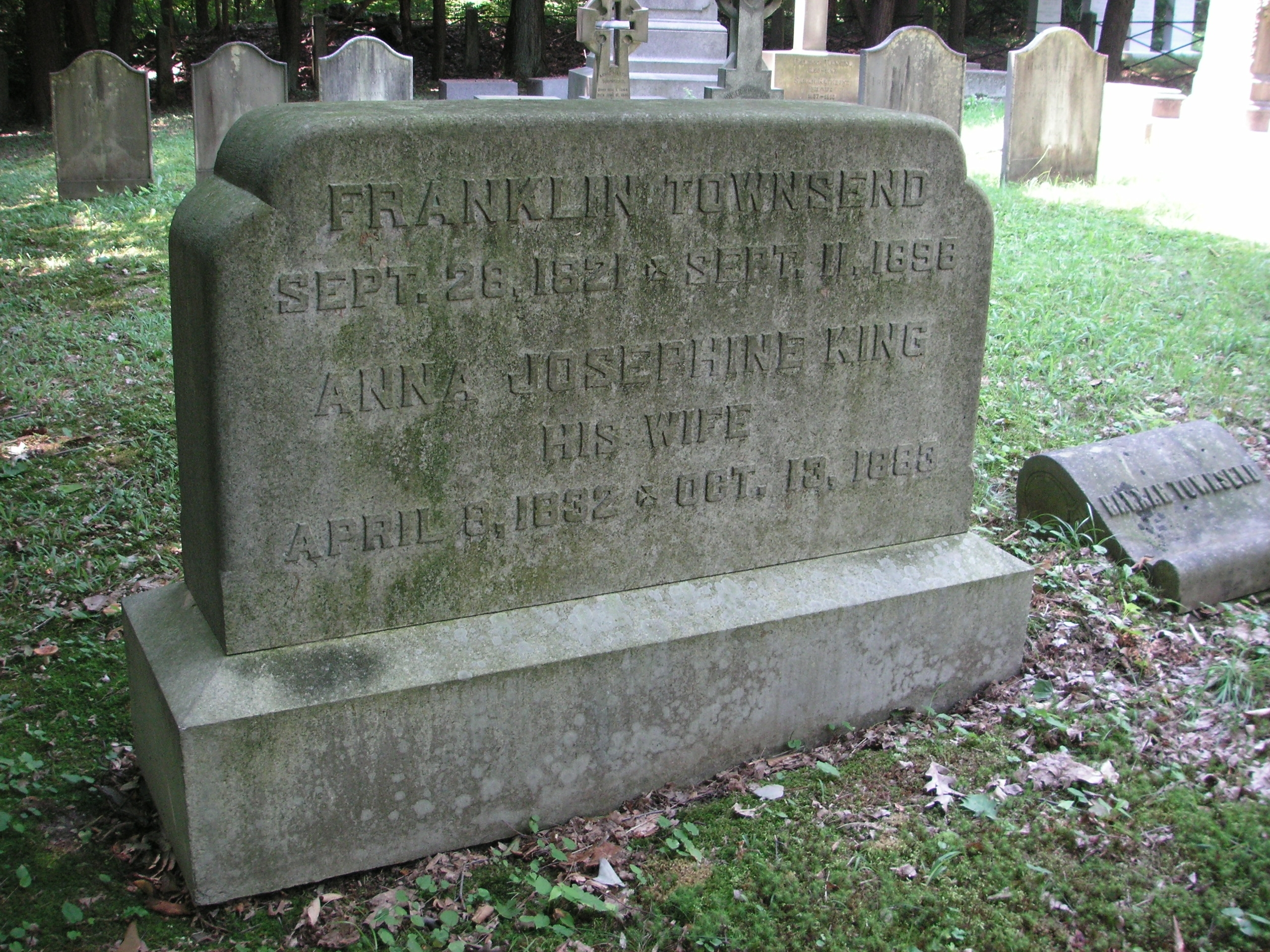
Grave of General Franklin Townsend and wife Anna Josephine King located at the Albany Rural Cemetery

When civil war broke out in the United States, Townsend became involved in raising the One Hundred and Thirteenth Regiment which in December 1862 was converted to the Seventh Heavy Artillery. Recruitment lasted from July 24, 1862, to August 18 and raised 1,100 men. The regiment left Albany the next day bound for Washington.

He was elected a third class (honorary) companion of the New York Commandery of the Military Order of the Loyal Legion of the United States for his support for the Union during the Civil War.

Townsend was appointed Adjutant General of New York for eight years: 1869 to 1873 and 1875 to 1879. He was succeeded by John F. Rathbone in 1873, then succeeded Rathbone to resume the post. After his second term, he was succeeded by John B. Woodward.

=== Political career ===
Townsend was active in Albany city politics, serving as a supervisor and alderman. On April 9, 1850, he was elected as a Whig the 47th Mayor of Albany, following in the footsteps of his uncle John Townsend, the 37th Mayor of Albany. Franklin Townsend was a Democratic member of the New York State Assembly (Albany Co., 4th D.) in 1857.

=== Commercial interests ===
In addition to his involvement in the family's iron business, Townsend was president of the New York State National Bank 1867 to 1879 and vice president of the Albany Savings Bank.

=== Death ===
Townsend died at his home at 4 Elk Street in Albany on September 11, 1898. His body is interred at the Albany Rural Cemetery in Albany.
