= 3rd New York Infantry Regiment =

- Active: May 14, 1861, to August 28, 1865
- Country: United States
- Allegiance: Union
- Branch: Infantry
- Size: 780, (Note: As reported back to Adjutant General Hillhouse upon departure from New York on June 3, 1861) 786, (Note: As reported back to Adjutant General Hillhouse, on December 31, 1862) 780 (Note: As reported back to Adjutant General Sprague, on December 31, 1863)
- Nickname: Albany Regiment
- Equipment: Enfield Rifled Muskets, (.577 caliber, rifled) (Note: On 3 June 1861, 786 long Enfield rifled muskets (ca!. 57).)
- Engagements: Battle of Big Bethel; Siege of Suffolk; Siege of Battery Wagner; Bombardment of Fort Sumter; Drewry's Bluff; Butler's Assault of Petersburg; Mine Explosion; Battle of Chaffin's Farm; First Battle of Fort Fisher; Second Battle of Fort Fisher; Campaign in the Carolinas; Battle of Bennett House

Commanders
- Colonel: Frederick Townsend
- Colonel: Samuel M. Alford
- Colonel: Eldridge G. Floyd
- Colonel: John Elmer Mulford

Insignia
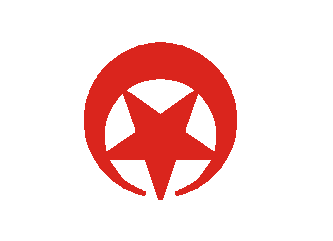
- VII Corps (1st Division) badge

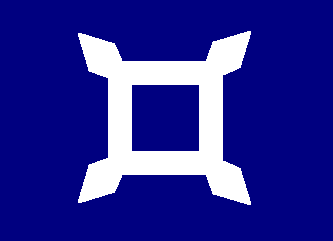
- X Corps (2nd Division) badge

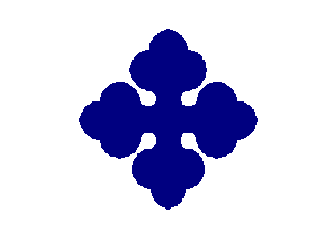
- XVIII Corps (3rd Division) badge

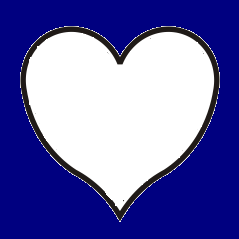
- XXIV Corps (2nd Division) badge

The 3rd New York Infantry Regiment was an infantry regiment that served in the Union Army during the American Civil War. It is also known as the Albany Regiment.

== Organization ==
The 3rd New York organized at Albany, received its numerical designation May 7, 1861, and was mustered into the U. S. service there on May 14, 1861, for two years. In April, 1863, a number of the members of the regiment re-enlisted for one and two years; these and the three years' men of the regiment were formed into a battalion May 18, 1863, and retained in the service, while those whose term of service had expired had been sent to Albany, where they were honorably discharged May 21, 1863.

The original companies were recruited principally:

- A — Williamsburgh Volunteers — Williamsburgh, and Brooklyn
- B - Newburgh, Cornwall, Fishkill, and Matteawan
- C - Albany, Cohoes, Otsego, Schoharie, and Troy
- D - Albany
- E — Syracuse Zouaves — Syracuse, Baldwinsville, Geddes, Salina, and Skaneateles
- F - Albany, Cohoes, and Stockport
- G - Albany, Bethlehem, Greenbush, Pittsfield, Sand Lake, Schenectady, Stillwater, Sudbury, Syracuse, and Troy
- H - Owego, Halsey Valley, Ridgeford, Spencer, and Tioga
- I - Oneida, Albany, Augusta, Brooklyn, Hampton, New York city, Syracuse, Vernon, Walesville, and Westmoreland
- K - Havana, Alpine, Beaver Dams, Benton, Burdette, Branchport, Catherine, Dix, Monterey, Odessa, Orange, Penn Yan, Millport, and Starkey.

== Service ==
On May 18, 1861, it left for New York and on June 3 arrived at Fortress Monroe. It shared in the engagement at Big Bethel, losing 2 men killed and 27 wounded, and returned to Fortress Monroe.

On July 30 it was ordered to Baltimore and quartered at Fort McHenry until April 1, 1862. The summer of 1862 was spent at Suffolk and the 3rd was present during the siege. On Sept. 12, the 3rd was again ordered to Fortress Monroe. The original members who were not reenlisted were mustered out in May 1863, but the regiment remained in the field, composed of 162 recruits and 200 veterans. The three years' men of the 9th New York ("Hawkins' Zouaves"), and sufficient drafted men were assigned to the battalion, and the latter brought up to a regimental standard. It commenced its service, as a veteran command with about 800 men, and subsequently received 700 conscripts and about 200 recruits. On June 13, 1865, the men of the 112th New York ("Chautauqua Regiment"), not discharged with their own regiment, were transferred to this.

The regiment was then ordered to Folly Island, where it took an active part in the operations against Rebel positions in Charleston Harbor. It took part in the Second Battle of Fort Wagner and the bombardment of Fort Sumter during the summer of 1863. In late August and into September it made attacks on Charleston going into the autumn. Of note, it was one of the regiments that occupied Wagner on September 8.

It returned to Virginia, where it became part of the Army of the James at Bermuda Hundred. In April, 1864 it visited Gloucester Point and West Point, and made a reconnaissance to within a few miles of King William Court House. It then moved up the James river and was active in the advance under Gen. Butler in May 1864, losing 5 killed, 50 wounded and 7 missing.

It fought in the battle of Drewry's Bluff and was then transferred to the 3rd Brigade, 3rd Division, XVIII Corps, which moved to Cold Harbor, where it was active until June 12, 1864, at which time it was transferred back to Bermuda Hundred. The regiment rejoined the X Corps on June 15, 1864, and formed part of the 1st Brigade, 2nd division, with which it was engaged in the assaults at Petersburg. On the 15th it started for Petersburgh, and reached a point within about two miles of the city, where it encountered the enemy, charged his works, captured 230 men of Wise's brigade, the battle-flag of the 26th Virginia, and some nine or ten pieces of artillery. It fell back on the 12th of July and resumed its old position from June. It fought at the Battle of the Crater on July 30, Fort Harrison and the Darbytown Road.

On December 3, 1864, the Third was attached to the 1st Brigade, 2nd Division, XXIV Corps and sent to North Carolina where it was engaged at Fort Fisher, Sugar Loaf Battery, Fort Anderson and Wilmington. At Fort Fisher, the State color which it carried was the first regimental color which was hoisted on the enemy's works. It remained in North Carolina performing picket and garrison duty until General Sherman's arrival and the close of the war.

Commanded by Lieut.-Col. George W. Warren, (Note: Mulford had been breveted to Major General and appointed the Commissioner of Exchange of Prisoners yet remained the Colonel of the Regiment, but had not been with it since 1862. Several of the Lieutenant Colonels had acted in command since then. Warren had begun the war as a private in the First Vermont and through his ability, risen to Lieut. Col. By the end of the war, all staff and line officers with the regiment had risen from the ranks.) it was mustered out of the service at Raleigh on August 28, 1865.

== Affiliations, battle honors, detailed service, and casualties ==
=== Organizational affiliation ===
Attached to:

- Attached to Fort Monroe and Camp Hamilton, VA, Dept. of Virginia, to July 1861.
- Dix's Command, Baltimore, MD, to June 1862.
- Mansfield's Division, Newport News, VA, Department of Virginia, to July 1862.
- Weber's Brigade, Division at Suffolk, [VII Corps, Dept. of Virginia, to September, 1862.
- Fortress Monroe, VA, Dept. of Virginia, to April 1863.
- Suffolk, VA, 1st Division, VII Corps, Dept of Virginia, to July 1863.
- Alvord's Brigade, Vodges' Division, Folly Island, SC, X Corps, Dept. of the South, to February 1864.
- 2nd Brigade, Vodges' Division, Northern District Folly Island, X Corps, to April 1864.
- 3rd Brigade, 2nd Division, X Corps, Army of the James, to May 1864.
- 1st Brigade, 2nd Division, X Corps, to May 1864.
- 3rd Brigade, 3rd Division, XVIII Corps, to June, 1864.
- 1st Brigade, 2nd Division, X Corps, to December 1864.
- 1st Brigade, 2nd Division, XXIV Corps, to January, 1865.
- 1st Brigade, 2nd Division, Terry's Provisional Corps, to March 1865.
- 1st Brigade, 2nd Division, X Corps, Army of the Ohio, to August 1865.

=== List of battles ===
The official list of battles in which the regiment bore a part:

- Battle of Big Bethel
- Siege of Suffolk
- Siege of Battery Wagner
- Bombardment of Fort Sumter
- Drewry's Bluff
- Butler's Assault of Petersburg
- Mine Explosion
- Battle of Chaffin's Farm
- First Battle of Fort Fisher
- Second Battle of Fort Fisher
- Campaign in the Carolinas
- Battle of Bennett House

=== Detailed service ===
==== 1861 ====
- Departed New York May 18
- Occupation of Newport News May 29
- Action at Big Bethel, VA, June 10
- Moved to Baltimore, MD, July 30, and duty there till June 6. 1862.

==== 1862 ====
- Moved to Suffolk, VA, June 6, and duty there till September.
- Moved to Fortress Monroe, and duty there till April, 1863.

==== 1863 ====
- Moved to Suffolk April 19
- Siege of Suffolk April 19-May 4
- Siege of Suffolk raised May 4. (2 years' men mustered out May 21, 1863.)
- Dix's Peninsula Campaign June 24-July 7
- Expedition from White House to South Anna River July 1–7
- Ordered to Folly Island, S. C.
- Action at Morris Island, S. C, August 3
- Siege operations against Forts Wagner and Gregg, Morris Island, S. C, and against Fort Sumpter and Charleston August 9-September 7
- Bombardment of Fort Sumpter August 17–23
- Capture of Forts Wagner and Gregg September 7
- Operations in Charleston Harbor against Forts Sumpter and Charleston September 8 to December 21
- Bombardment of Fort Sumpter October 27-November 9
- Duty on Folly Island, S. C, till April, 1864.

==== 1864 ====
- Moved to Gloucester Point, VA
- Butler's operations on south side of James River and against Petersburg and Richmond May 4-2S
- Port Walthall May 7
- Swift Creek or Arrowfield Church May 9–10
- Operations against Fort Darling May 12–16
- Battle of Drury's Bluff May 14–16
- Bermuda Hundred May 16–28
- Moved to White House, thence to Cold Harbor May 28–31
- Cold Harbor June 1–12
- Before Petersburg June 15–18
- Siege operations against Petersburg and Richmond June 16 to December 12, 1864
- Mine Explosion, Petersburg, July 30
- Duty in the trenches before Petersburg and on the Bermuda front till September 27
- Chaffin's Farm, New Market Heights, September 28–30
- Battle of Fair Oaks October 27–28
- In trenches before Richmond till December 7
- Expedition to Fort Fisher, N. C, December 7–27

==== 1865 ====
- 2nd Expedition to Fort Fisher, N. C, January 3–15, 1865
- Assault on and capture of Fort Fisher, N. C, January 15
- Sugar Loaf Battery February 11
- Fort Anderson February 18–20
- Capture of Wilmington February 22
- Advance on Kinston and Goldsboro March 6–21
- Duty in the Dept. of North Carolina till August
- Mustered out August 28, 1865.

== Total strength and casualties ==
The regiment suffered 37 deaths from wounds and 85 from other causes, for a total of 122 fatalities. Of these, one officer was killed in combat while 2 more died from disease or accident. Thirty Six enlisted men were killed while 83 died from disease or accident.

== Commanders ==
- Colonel Frederick Townsend
- Colonel Samuel M. Alford
- Colonel Eldridge G. Floyd
- Colonel John Elmer Mulford

== Armament ==
The 3rd New York was issued the British Pattern 1853 rifles (Note: These were the standard rifle for the British army having performed well in the Crimean War. The Enfield was a .577 calibre Minié-type muzzle-loading rifled musket. It was used by both armies and was the second most widely used infantry weapon in the Union forces.) (.58 and .577 Cal) from stocks already in the State of New York's possession. (Note: These rifles had been manufactured by contract in 1856 in Windsor, Vermont by the Robbins and Lawrence Armory (R&L) and Connecticut and Massachusetts by Eli Whitney.The company had been able to sell gun making machinery (150 in all), to upgrade the new Enfield Armory in England. The British also awarded a later contract during the Crimean War for 25,000 Enfield P1853 and P1856 rifles. The contract's stiff penalty clause for missing the production schedule caused R&L to go bankrupt in 1859. Lamon, Goodnow and Yale (LG&Y) bought the factory to make sewing machines, but the onset of the war led them to continue producing the P1853 for the duration of the war. Eli Whitney bought some of the R&L bankruptcy inventory of incomplete P1853s, completed them, and sold them to New York.)

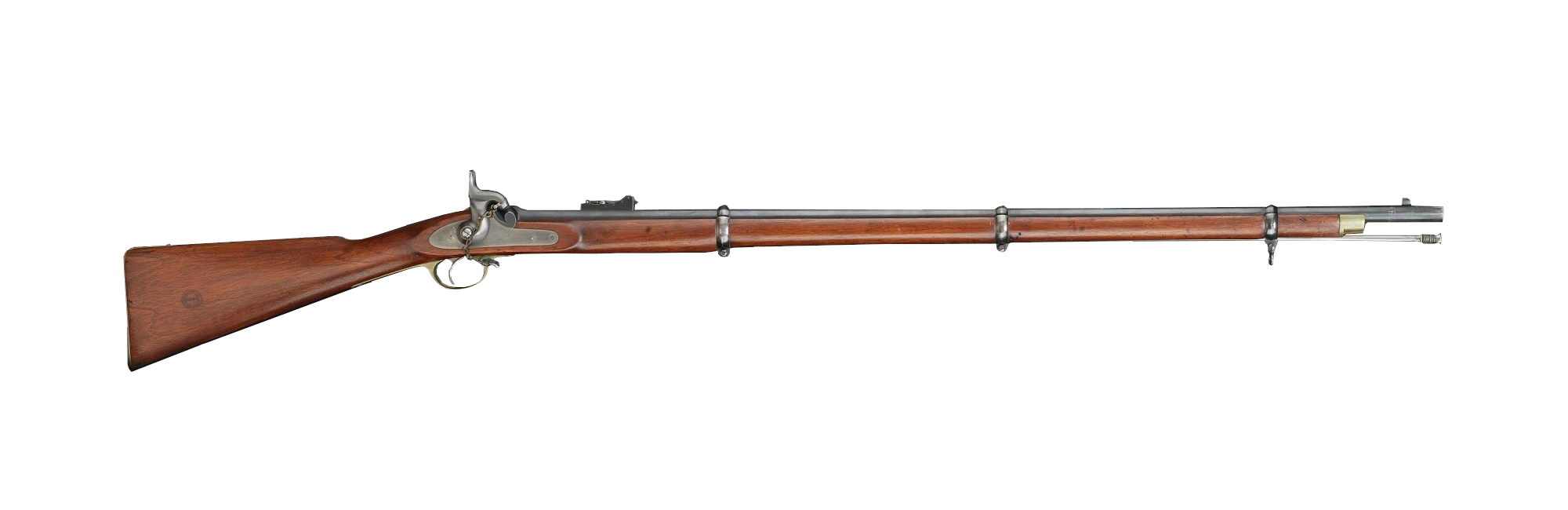
Pattern 1853 Enfield rifle-musket

== Uniform ==
The men of the regiment were issued an Americanized Zouave uniform which they wore for the duration of service. The uniform consisted of a dark blue Zouave jacket with red trimming, dark blue pantaloons, white gaiters, red fez with a blue tassel, and a dark blue Zouave vest with a red trimming. The transfers from the 9th New York continued wearing their original uniforms until they wore out when they were issued 3rd New York uniforms.

== See also ==
- List of New York Civil War regiments
