= John B. Woodward =

US militia major general from New York (1835–1896)

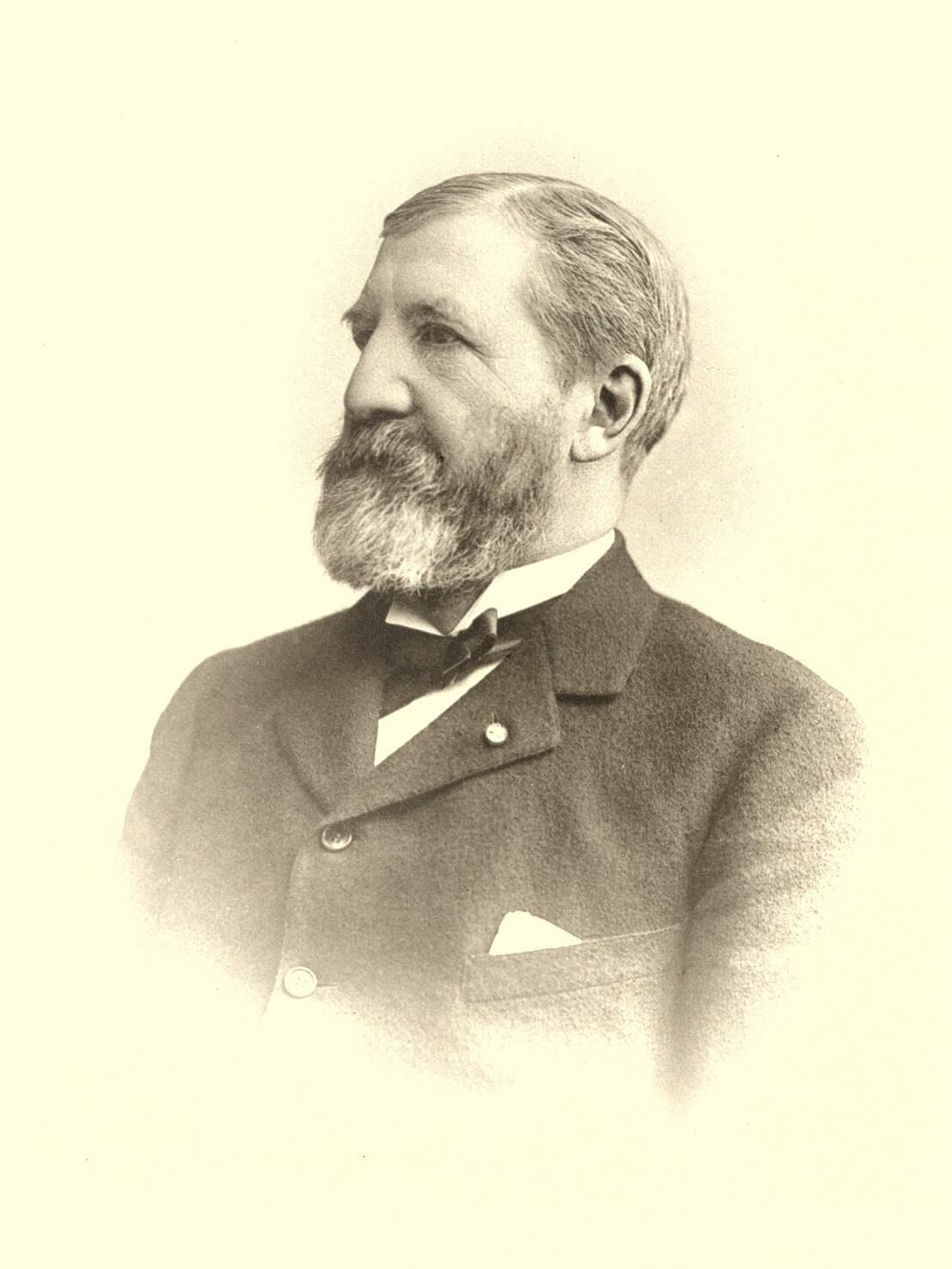
- From 1897's John B. Woodward: A Biographical Memoir
- Born: 31 May 1835; Brooklyn, New York, US
- Died: 7 March 1896 (aged 60) Brooklyn, New York, US
- Buried: Green-Wood Cemetery, Brooklyn, New York, US
- Allegiance: Union (American Civil War); United States
- Service: New York Militia
- Service years: 1854–1866, 1869–1879
- Rank: Major General
- Commands: Company E, 13th Regiment, New York Militia; 13th Regiment, New York Militia; 2nd Division, New York Militia; Adjutant General of New York
- Wars: American Civil War
- Spouse: Elizabeth Cook Blackburne (m. 1870–1896)
- Children: 4
- Other work: Businessman

John B. Woodward (31 May 1835 – 7 March 1896) was an American businessman and militia officer from Brooklyn, New York. A supporter of the Union and a veteran of the American Civil War, he attained the rank of major general and his commands included the militia's Company E, 13th Regiment, the 13th Regiment, and the 2nd Division. He served as Adjutant General of New York from 1879 to 1880. In his civilian career, Woodward ran a successful import and export businesses.

A lifelong resident of Brooklyn, Woodward was educated at private schools and as a teenager began a career in importing and exporting. In 1854, he joined the New York Militia's 13th Regiment. He became an officer in 1861; during the American Civil War, Woodward's regiment was called to active duty on several occasions, and he advanced through the ranks to become commander with the rank of colonel.

Woodward resigned his commission in 1866, but returned to service in 1869 as commander of the militia's 2nd Division with the rank of major general. In 1874, he resigned as division commander so he could serve as the state militia's inspector general with the rank of brigadier general. In 1879, he was appointed adjutant general with the rank of major general, and he served until 1880.

In addition to his business interests, Woodward was a noted Brooklyn civic activist. He died in Brooklyn on 7 March 1896 and was buried at Green-Wood Cemetery in Brooklyn.

== Early life and start of career ==
John Blackburne Woodward was born in Brooklyn on 31 May 1835, a son of silversmith Thomas Woodward and Mary Barrow (Blackburne) Woodward. He was educated at several private academies in Brooklyn and as a teenager began work as a clerk in the leather importing business of his uncle George Woodward. In 1859, he joined the business of Edward Haynes, which specialized in importing hides and leather products from countries in South America and exporting to South America finished US made goods. He soon became the firm's general manager, then a partner; when Haynes retired in 1881, Woodward took over as the sole proprietor.

In the early 1850s, Woodward served as a volunteer firefighter. In June 1854, Woodward joined the New York Militia, enlisting as a private in Company G, 13th Regiment. He was promoted to corporal in October 1855 and first sergeant in April 1857. In February 1861, Woodward received his officer's commission after winning an election to fill a vacant second lieutenant's position in the 13th Regiment.

== Continued career ==
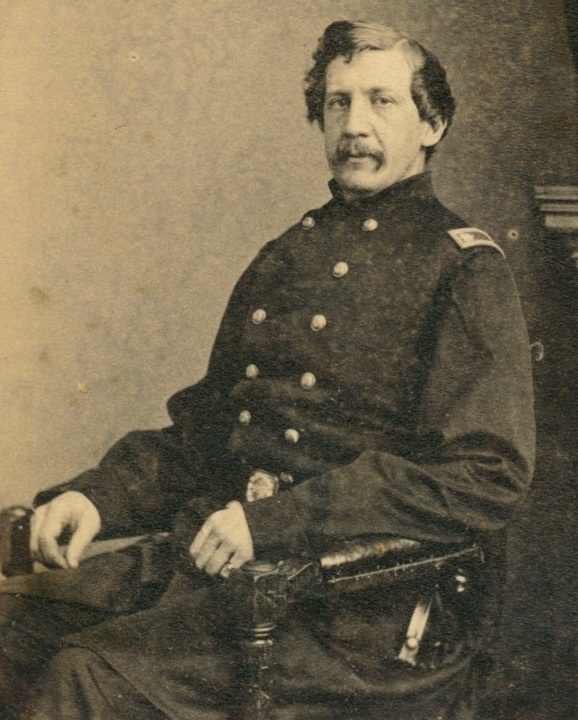
Woodward as a lieutenant colonel in 1862

With the outbreak of the American Civil War, the 13th Regiment answered President Abraham Lincoln's call for volunteer troops to serve for 90 days; most members of the regiment were mobilized, as were several new recruits raised for wartime service. During their three months in uniform, members of the 13th Regiment performed reconnaissance and patrol duties in Annapolis, Maryland, occupation duties in Baltimore, and participated in the Civil War Defenses of Washington.

In May 1861, Woodward commanded a detachment that combined with one led by US Navy officer Charles W. Flusser to recover a lightship that had been captured by Confederates and hidden on a tributary of the Great Wicomico River. During his active duty service, Woodward was promoted to first lieutenant, but he later agreed to accept reduction in rank to second lieutenant so that a former member of the regiment, First Lieutenant Evan M. Johnson, who had performed temporary duty elsewhere, could rejoin the 13th. Near the end of the 13th Regiment's active duty, Woodward was appointed as regimental adjutant. The 13th Regiment completed its federal service in July 1861 and was mustered out in New York City at the end of the month.

Woodward's seven year enlistment expired in June 1861, but he opted to continue his military service. In November 1861, he was elected commander of Company E, 13th Regiment with the rank of captain. Woodward commanded Company E only briefly, because in January 1862, he was elected regimental second-in-command with the rank of lieutenant colonel. In April 1862, Confederate forces again threatened Washington, DC and Lincoln once more appealed for troops. New York mobilized twelve militia regiments, including the 13th. In May and June, the 13th Regiment garrisoned Fort McHenry, Maryland. In July, members of the 13th Regiment enlisted for an additional three months, and performed garrison duties in Suffolk, Virginia, which forces of the Union Army had recently captured from the Confederacy. The regiment was mustered out in Brooklyn at the end of its service in September 1862.

In late 1862, a new New York Militia regiment was organized from veterans of the 13th. The members of the new regiment, the 23rd, elected Woodward as their lieutenant colonel, which he accepted. Soon afterward, the commander of the 13th Regiment resigned and Woodward was elected to succeed him with the rank of colonel. As Confederate forces moved into Pennsylvania in June 1863, the federal government again appealed for troops and New York's contingent included the 13th Regiment. Upon arrival in Harrisburg, Pennsylvania, the regiment was assigned to improve the defenses of Harrisburg and nearby Bridgeport, and perform guard and patrol duties. The 13th Regiment was demobilized after the Confederate defeat at the July 1863 Battle of Gettysburg, after which it returned to New York. The New York City draft riots broke out soon after the 13th Regiment arrived, and it was among the army and militia units called upon to help restore order. The war ended in April 1865 and Woodward resigned his commission in June 1866. In 1867, he was elected a companion of the Military Order of the Loyal Legion of the United States.

== Later career ==
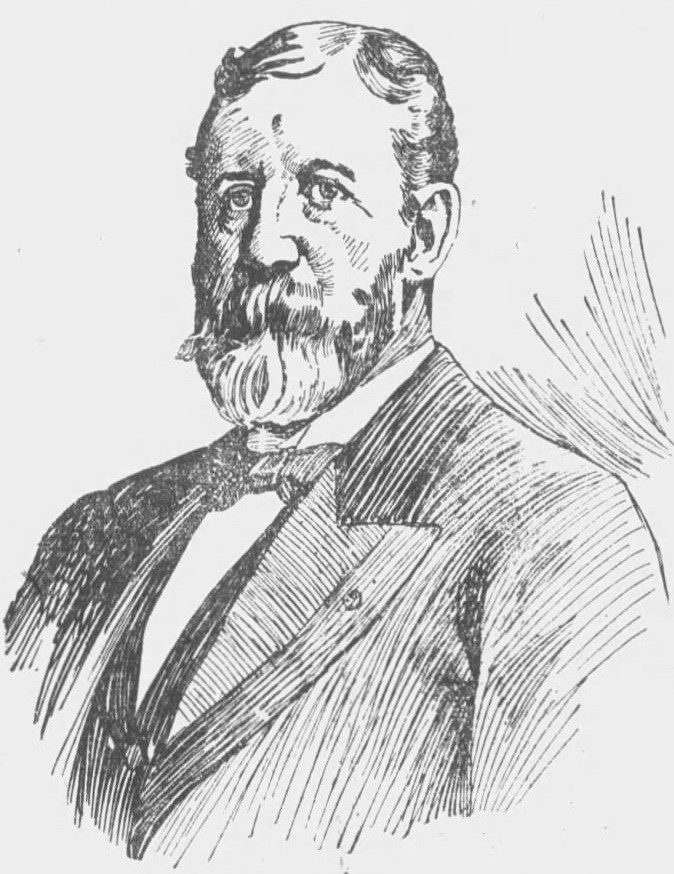
1899 newspaper illustration

In March 1869, Woodward returned to military service when Governor John T. Hoffman appointed him to command the militia's 2nd Division with the rank of major general. Woodward led an effort to improve the division's recruiting, training, and administration, all of which had flagged during the post-Civil War force drawdown. An advocate of improving the marksmanship of militia members, he was one of the organizers of the National Rifle Association and helped oversee the design and construction of the Creedmoor Rifle Range. In 1874, Woodward resigned as commander of the 2nd Division and accepted reduction in rank to brigadier general so he could serve as the state militia's inspector general. His division staff regarded him so highly that they formed a fraternal and reunion association, the General Woodward Staff. When the Great Railroad Strike of 1877 affected railways in New York, Woodward relied on his knowledge of the readiness status of the militia to recommend to the governor and state adjutant general which units to activate in response.

In April 1879, Governor Lucius Robinson appointed Woodward to succeed Franklin Townsend as Adjutant General of New York. In this role, he continued efforts to enhance the training and readiness, administration, and recruiting initiatives he had advocated as 2nd Division commander and state inspector general. In addition, with the militia undergoing transformation into the National Guard, he implemented an annual statewide meeting of all officers, at which participants received briefings from senior leaders about long range plans and goals and had the opportunity to offer input. Woodward was succeeded as adjutant general by Frederick Townsend. When Grover Cleveland became governor in 1883, he offered to reappoint Woodward, but Woodward's need to concentrate on management of his business led him to decline.

In addition to operating his export business, Woodward was a director of the Third National Bank of New York. His other business ventures included director and vice president of the Nassau National Bank, trustee of the Bowery Savings Bank, trustee of the Franklin Safe Deposit Company and Franklin Trust Company, and trustee of the Mutual Life Insurance Company of Brooklyn. He was a Democrat in politics and a longtime advocate of civil service reform, including a term as vice president of the Brooklyn association formed to promote it. Woodward was also involved in several civic causes, including serving as president of Brooklyn's department of city works in 1875. In addition, he was the longtime president of the Brooklyn Institute of Arts and Science. Despite Seth Low's Republican affiliation, Woodward supported his successful campaigns for mayor in 1880 and 1882. When construction of the Fulton Street Line, an elevated railway between Manhattan and Brooklyn, was planned in the early 1880s, Woodward was appointed to the commission that oversaw the design and construction.

In 1883, he joined the newly organized Brooklyn Citizens League, which advocated a non-partisan municipal government for Brooklyn. In 1885, he was appointed to the state commission that investigated allegations of mismanagement at Green-Wood Cemetery, and the inquiry ended with the vindication of the facility's leadership. Dissatisfied with the major party candidates for mayor in 1885, Woodward ran unsuccessfully as an independent. In June 1888, Woodward was appointed president of the commission that oversaw Brooklyn's department of parks. Commissioners concentrated their efforts on improvements to Prospect Park, which had fallen into disrepair. The commission was subsequently reduced from eight members to three; Mayor Alfred C. Chapin offered Woodward reappointment to the new panel, which he declined. In 1892, Brooklyn leaders planned a parkway along The Narrows and New York Bay, and Woodward was appointed president of the commission that carried out design and construction. When Armenian Christians were killed in the 1895 Hamidian massacres, Woodward was selected as treasurer of a Brooklyn fund raised to provide aid to the survivors. Also in 1895, Woodward was appointed chairman of an advisory commission that was tasked with recommending improvements and expansion of Brooklyn's park system.

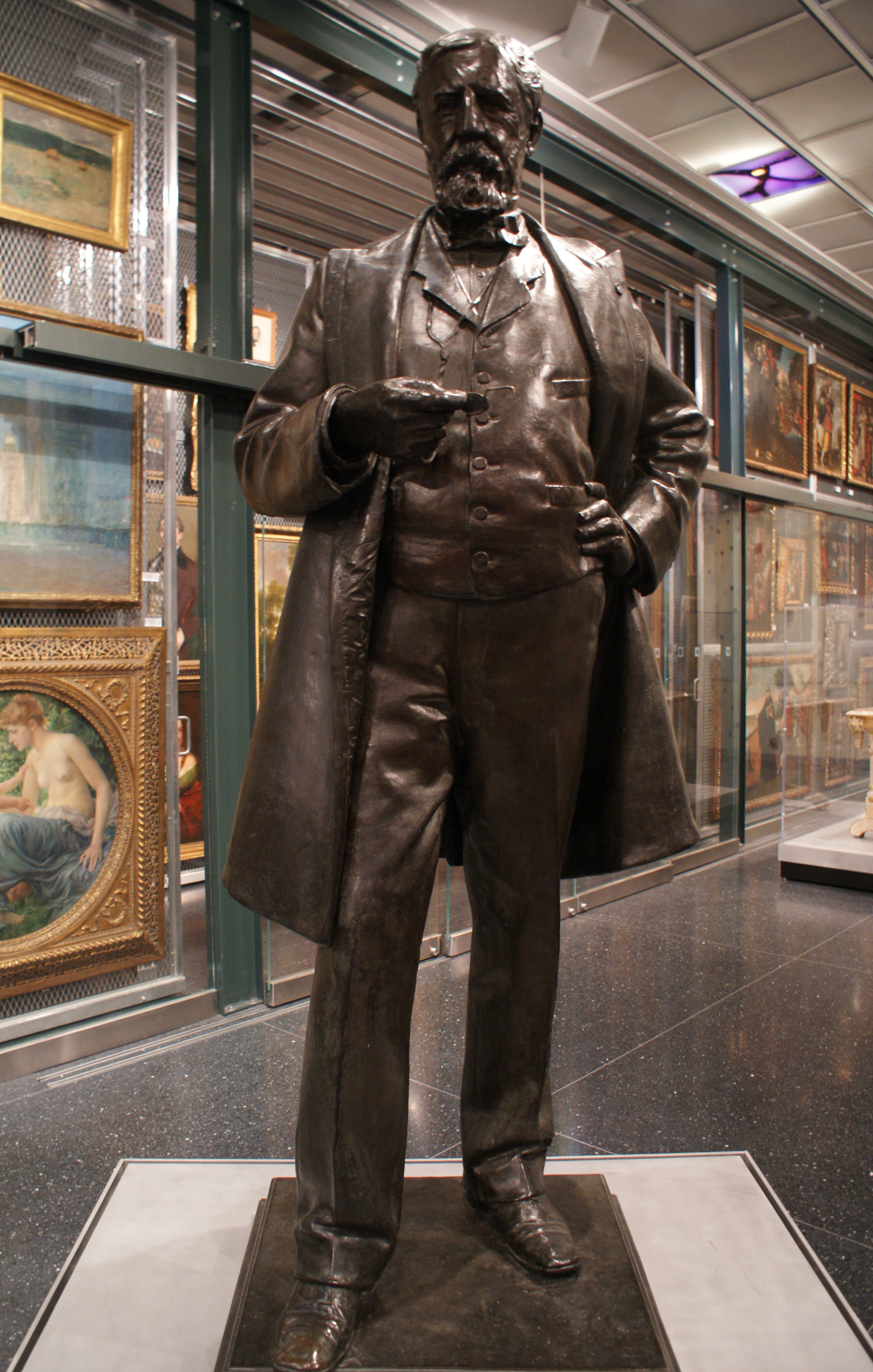
Brooklyn Museum statue of John B. Woodward

== Personal ==
In 1870, Woodward married Elizabeth Cook Blackburne. They were married until his death and were the parents of four children.

Woodward became ill in February 1896. He soon developed pneumonia and was confined to his bed. Woodward died at his Brooklyn home on 6 March 1896. He was buried at Green-Wood Cemetery.

In 1901, Frederick William MacMonnies created a bronze statue of Woodward, which was paid for by a Brooklyn citizens' committee organized for the purpose. The work is displayed on the 5th Floor of the Brooklyn Museum, within the Luce Visible Storage and Study Center.
