= Bethel Manor, Virginia =

Coordinates: 37°5′59″N 76°25′44″W

Bethel Manor is a census-designated place (CDP) in York County, Virginia, United States. As of the 2020 census, Bethel Manor had a population of 4,540. Bethel Manor is a Military Family Community for Joint Base Langley-Eustis.

== Demographics ==
Historical population
Census	Pop.	Note	%±
2010	3,792		—
2020	4,540		19.7%
U.S. Decennial Census; 2000 2010

Bethel Manor was first listed as a census designated place in the 2010 U.S. census.

=== 2020 census ===
As of the 2020 census, Bethel Manor had a population of 4,540. The median age was 21.1 years. 47.7% of residents were under the age of 18 and 0.6% of residents were 65 years of age or older. For every 100 females there were 98.5 males, and for every 100 females age 18 and over there were 94.3 males age 18 and over.

100.0% of residents lived in urban areas, while 0.0% lived in rural areas.

There were 1,170 households in Bethel Manor, of which 84.1% had children under the age of 18 living in them. Of all households, 85.0% were married-couple households, 5.4% were households with a male householder and no spouse or partner present, and 9.4% were households with a female householder and no spouse or partner present. About 3.7% of all households were made up of individuals and 0.5% had someone living alone who was 65 years of age or older.

There were 1,219 housing units, of which 4.0% were vacant. The homeowner vacancy rate was 0.0% and the rental vacancy rate was 3.7%.

Racial composition as of the 2020 census
Race	Number	Percent
White	2,667	58.7%
Black or African American	784	17.3%
American Indian and Alaska Native	20	0.4%
Asian	167	3.7%
Native Hawaiian and Other Pacific Islander	32	0.7%
Some other race	153	3.4%
Two or more races	717	15.8%
Hispanic or Latino (of any race)	718	15.8%
