= Battle of Big Bethel =

1861 American Civil War battle in Virginia

- Part of the American Civil War
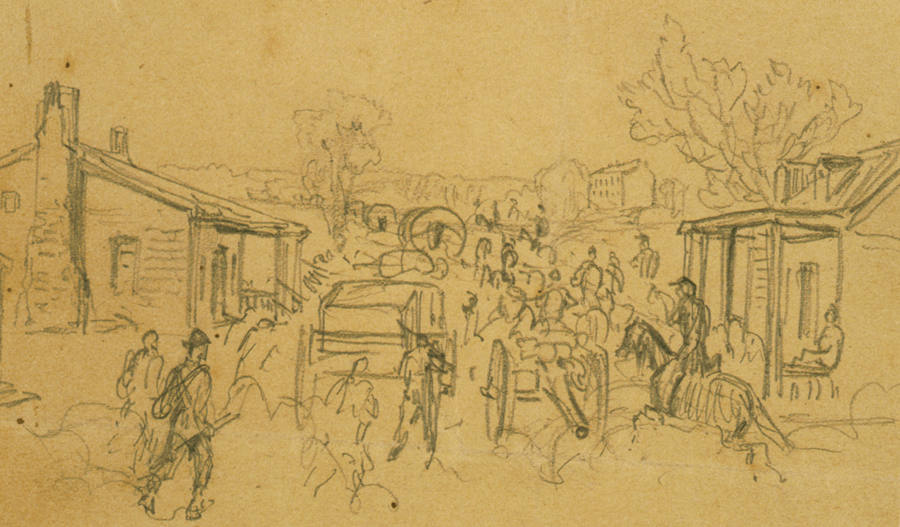
- Big Bethel; Alfred R. Waud, artist, June 10, 1861.
Date	June 10, 1861
Location	Tabb and Hampton, Virginia 37.0937°N 76.4250°W
Result	Confederate victory

Belligerents
United States (Union)	CSA (Confederacy)

Commanders and leaders
Benjamin F. Butler; Ebenezer W. Peirce	John B. Magruder; Daniel H. Hill

Strength
3,500	1,400

Casualties and losses
18 killed; 53 wounded; 5 missing	1 killed; 7 wounded

The Battle of Big Bethel, also known as the Battle of Bethel Church or Great Bethel, was one of the earliest land battles of the American Civil War. It took place on the Virginia Peninsula, near Newport News, on June 10, 1861.

Virginia's decision to secede from the Union had been ratified by popular vote on May 23, and Confederate colonel (later major general) John B. Magruder was sent down the peninsula to deter any advance on the state capital Richmond by Union troops based at the well-defended post of Fort Monroe. This garrison was commanded by Major General Benjamin Butler, a former Massachusetts lawyer and politician, who established a new camp at nearby Hampton and another at Newport News. Magruder had also established two camps within range of the Union lines, at Big Bethel and Little Bethel, to lure his opponent into a premature action.

Butler took the bait, when he and an aide, Major Theodore Winthrop, devised a plan for a night march, followed by a dawn attack to drive the Confederates back from their bases. Butler chose not to lead the force in person, for which he was later criticized. The plan proved too complex for his poorly trained subordinates to carry out, especially at night, and his staff had also omitted to communicate the passwords. They were trying to advance without knowledge of the layout or strength of the Confederate positions when a friendly fire incident gave away their own. The commander in the field, Massachusetts militia general, Ebenezer Peirce, received most of the blame for the failed operation.

The Union forces suffered 76 casualties, with 18 killed, including Maj. Winthrop and Lt. John T. Greble, the first regular army officer killed in the war. The Confederates suffered only eight casualties, with one killed. Although Magruder subsequently withdrew to Yorktown and his defensive line along the Warwick River, he had won a propaganda victory, and local Union forces attempted no further significant advance until the Peninsula Campaign of 1862. While small compared to many later battles, Big Bethel attracted exaggerated importance because of the general feeling that the war would soon be over.

== Background ==
=== Union holds, reinforces Fort Monroe ===
After the American Civil War began with the formal surrender of Fort Sumter to Confederate forces on April 14, 1861, and President Lincoln's call for volunteers to suppress the rebellion on April 15, 1861, Virginia's political leaders quickly set in motion the process of seceding from the Union and joining the Confederacy. Even before secession was formally accomplished, Virginia agreed to coordinate its state military forces with the Confederacy and began to seize federal property. The United States Regular Army garrison under the command of Colonel Justin Dimick held Fort Monroe, a nearly impregnable fortress at Old Point Comfort on the southern tip of the Virginia Peninsula between the York River and the James River where they empty into the Chesapeake Bay. The bay was to the east of the fort and Hampton Roads was to the south. The fort was supported by the Union Navy at Hampton Roads and could be reinforced and resupplied by water without attack by shore batteries or harassment by the nearly non-existent Virginia or Confederate naval forces. The fort was nearly immune from attack from the land side since it could be approached only over a narrow causeway and a narrow isthmus and had massive walls and hundreds of cannons. An inlet called Mill Creek was the body of water that almost cut the fort off from the mainland of the Peninsula.

Colonel Dimick refused to surrender the fort and the small and poorly equipped Virginia (soon to be Confederate) militia forces in the area had no hope of taking the fort by force, especially after April 20, 1861, when the small Union garrison was reinforced by two Massachusetts volunteer regiments within a few days of the Virginia convention voting to secede from the Union on April 17, 1861. This important fort provided a base for the blockade of Norfolk, Virginia, and the Chesapeake Bay and for the recovery of southeast Virginia and the Virginia Peninsula for the Union.

Because Massachusetts militia forces were ready to respond to President Lincoln's call for volunteers, two 90–day regiments, the 3rd Massachusetts Militia commanded by Colonel David W. Wardrop and the 4th Massachusetts Militia commanded by Colonel Abner B. Packard, were able to reinforce Fort Monroe's garrison of 415 regulars within five days of the President's call. The 4th Massachusetts was the first to arrive. These reinforcements helped ensure that this strong point and base of operations would be fully prepared for defense and saved for the Union. On May 13, 1861, the 1st Regiment, Vermont Volunteer Infantry, under Colonel J. Wolcott Phelps joined the garrison and several other volunteer regiments from New York soon followed.

On May 14, 1861, while Colonel Dimick was still in command of the garrison, he seized a well just outside the fort in what was then Elizabeth City County because the fort did not have enough water even for its original small garrison. His forces also occupied the Mill Creek Bridge, which was needed for access to the peninsula from the fort and the nearby Clark farm. The fort soon could not hold all of the arriving reinforcements so Union forces established Camp Troy, soon renamed Camp Hamilton in honor of an aide to General-in-Chief Winfield Scott, on the Segar farm on the Hampton side of Mill Creek, within range of the guns of Fort Monroe.

=== Butler takes command, expands Union bridgehead ===
While Colonel Dimick remained in command of the 415 regular army soldiers, Volunteer Major General Benjamin F. Butler of Massachusetts took command of Fort Monroe and the entire garrison on May 23, 1861. With continuing reinforcements, Butler could not only retain the Union hold on Fort Monroe but support the Union blockade of the Chesapeake Bay, move up the Peninsula, and threaten to retake Norfolk, Virginia, and other locations on the south side of Hampton Roads from the Confederates.

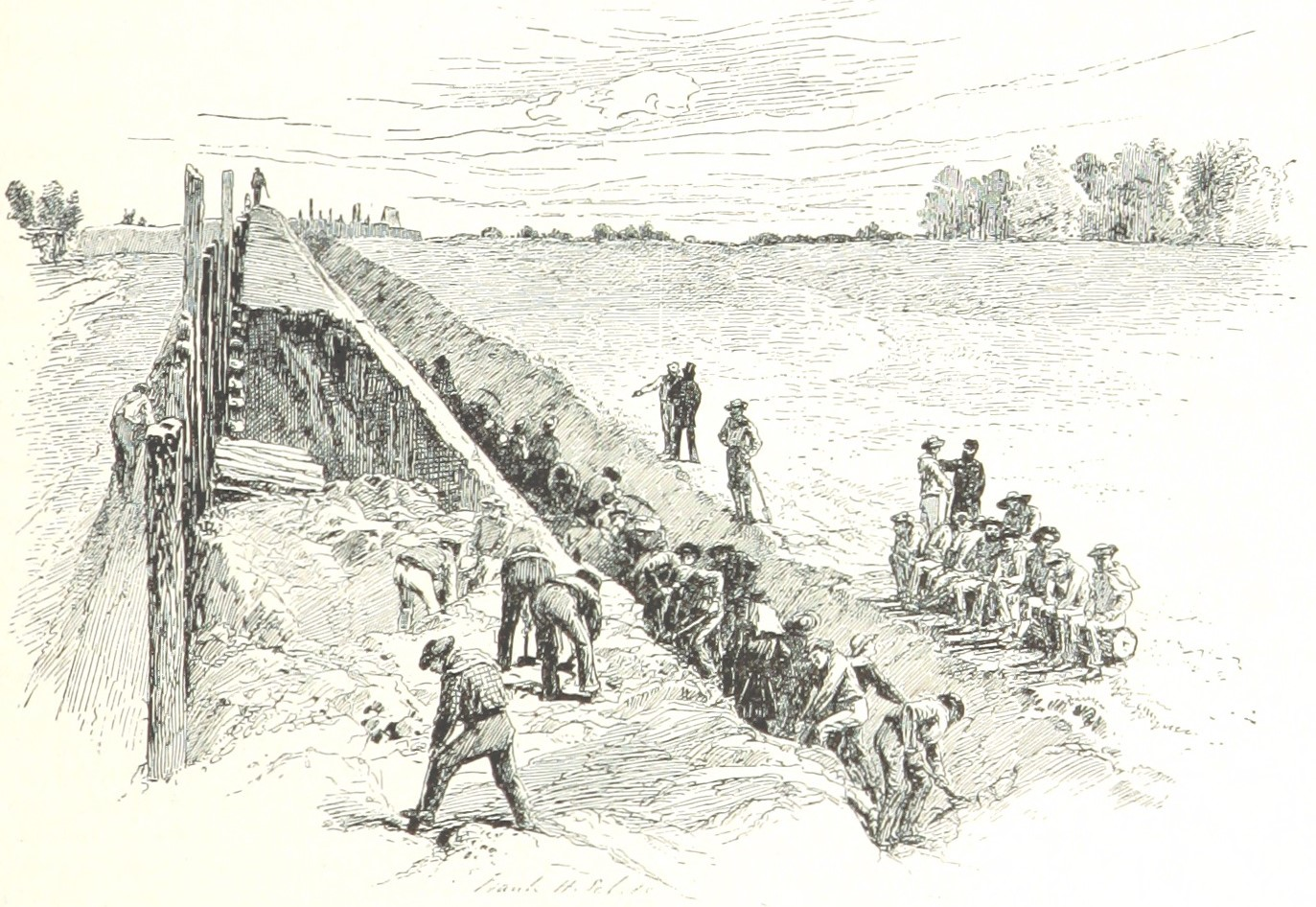
The 4th Massachusetts Regiment works to fortify Camp Butler

On May 27, 1861, General Butler sent a force 8 miles (13 km) west to occupy the lightly defended adjacent town of Newport News at Newport News Point, an excellent anchorage for the Union Navy. This force established and significantly fortified Camp Butler and a battery at Newport News Point that could cover the entrance to the James River ship canal and the mouth of the Nansemond River. By May 29 Butler's force, which included the 1st Vermont Infantry, Colonel John A. Bendix's 7th New York Volunteer Infantry Regiment (a regiment of German speakers), the 4th Massachusetts Volunteer Infantry Regiment, Scott's Life Guards and a detachment of U.S. regulars to man artillery, completed the mission. On June 8, 1861, the camp, which was commanded by Colonel Phelps of the 1st Vermont Infantry, also was reinforced by the 9th New York Volunteer Infantry Regiment (Hawkin's Zouaves). Butler also further occupied and expanded Camp Hamilton, started by Colonel Dimick in the equally lightly defended, adjacent town of Hampton, just beyond the confines of the fort and within the range of its guns. After Colonel Abram Duryee of the 5th New York Infantry commanded Camp Hamilton for a week, on June 4, 1861, Massachusetts militia Brigadier General Ebenezer Peirce assumed command.

=== Confederate response ===
Major General Robert E. Lee in charge of Virginia (soon to be Confederate) forces, which already were in league with the Confederacy, responded to the growing Union threat from Fort Monroe by sending Colonel John Bankhead Magruder to defend the southeastern area of the Peninsula and push Union forces back to the fort. Magruder was given the command on May 21, 1861. On May 24 he established his headquarters at Yorktown, Virginia and set up his defenses. Soon Magruder's original small Virginia force was increased to about 1,500 men by the inclusion of Colonel Daniel Harvey Hill's 1st North Carolina Volunteer Infantry, Lieutenant Colonel William D. Stuart's 3rd Virginia Infantry (Wythe Rifles), a cavalry battalion under Major E.B. Montague, and the Richmond Howitzer Artillery Battalion under Major George W. Randolph (grandson of Thomas Jefferson and future Confederate Secretary of War).

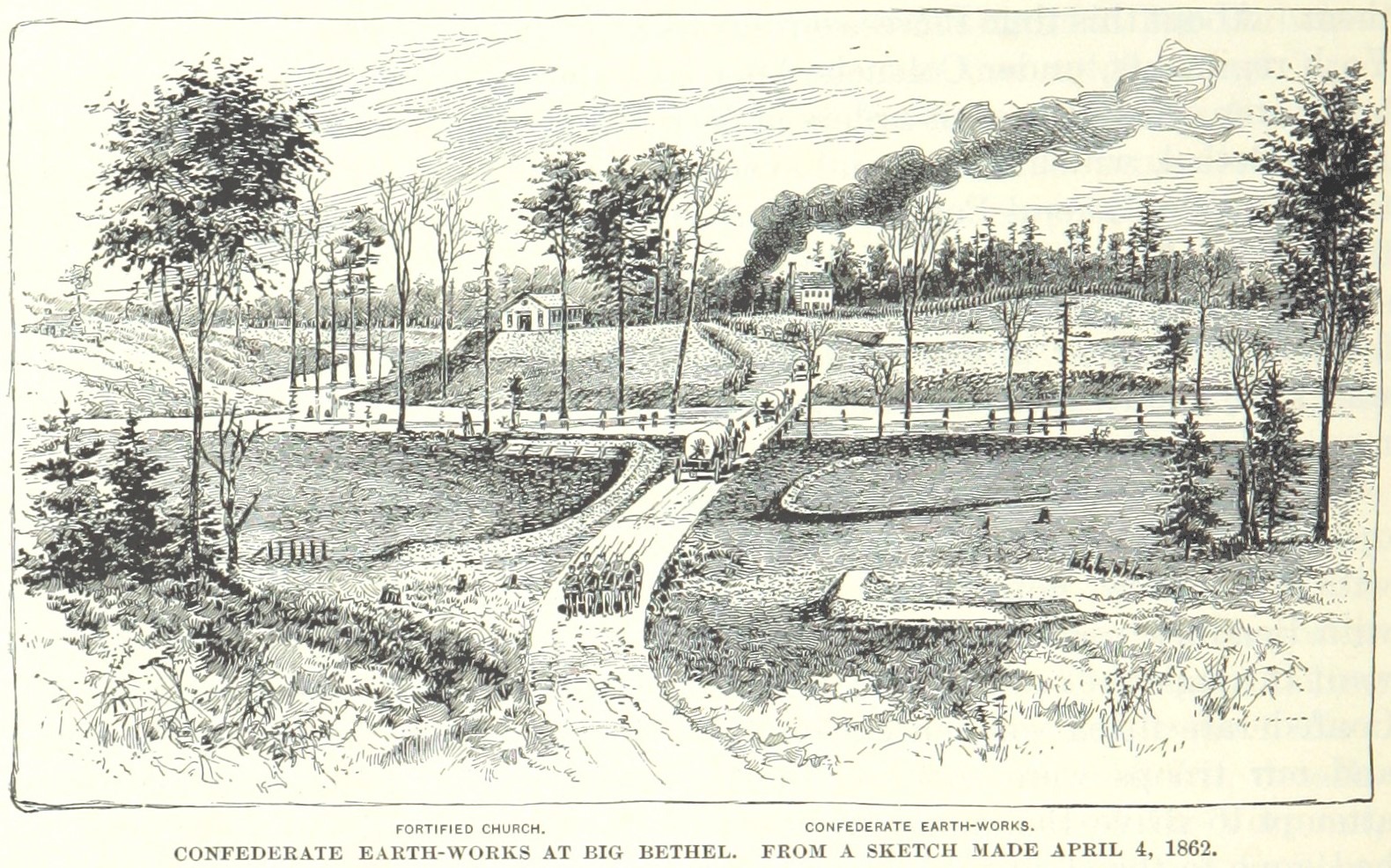
Confederate earthworks at Big Bethel in April 1862

On June 6 Magruder sent D.H. Hill and the 1st North Carolina Volunteers and Randolph and part of the Richmond Howitzer Battalion with four artillery pieces to Big Bethel Church (or Great Bethel Church) within 8 miles (13 km) of the Union's camps at Newport News and Hampton to establish an advanced position at that location. When the Confederates arrived at Big Bethel Church, they found it marked with writings on the walls such as "Death to traitors," which were left by Union soldiers during an earlier reconnaissance and which greatly annoyed the Confederates. Hill seized high ground just north of the west branch of the Back River and established a well-fortified camp which crossed the road between Yorktown and Hampton and commanded the bridge over the Back River. On the north side of the river, Hill had his men dig entrenchments, laying out the position in the form of a square. He had an outlying position guarding an old ford on his left and a redoubt for a howitzer on his right and across the river. He also had some flank protection from heavy woods and marshes. Magruder's force also established an outpost at Little Bethel Church about 8 miles (13 km) from Hampton. The fortified position at Big Bethel Church was a short distance further north from Little Bethel Church, along and mainly north of Marsh Creek (now named Brick Kiln Creek), a tributary of Back Creek. The position at Big Bethel Church crossed and blocked the main road between Yorktown and Hampton. Magruder's force of almost 1,500 men occupied the position at Big Bethel Church, while only around 50 cavalrymen manned the outpost at Little Bethel Church. On June 8 Hill sent detachments to drive Union foraging (or pillaging) parties back to the fort.

=== Butler plans to drive Confederates back ===
Butler wished to drive the Confederates back from their advanced positions at Little Bethel and Big Bethel because they had begun attacking and harassing his pickets and patrols with squads from these outposts, threatening his bases outside of Fort Monroe and his lines of communication with them and standing in the way of his planned move up the Peninsula toward Richmond, the new capital of the Confederacy. An escaped slave, George Scott, who was working for the Union Army at Fort Monroe, was able to scout the Confederate position at Big Bethel and give a good report to Butler, but Butler knew little about the Confederate position at Little Bethel, which he assumed was also a substantial installation manned by a large force. Along with his aide, Major Theodore Winthrop, already an accomplished author, Butler devised a plan for a night march and surprise attack on the Confederate position at Little Bethel at dawn by columns converging from Newport News and Hampton. Butler's main objective was Little Bethel, where he expected to find a large Confederate force. Only after Little Bethel was taken would the commander in the field proceed to Big Bethel, if he chose to do so.

== Battle ==
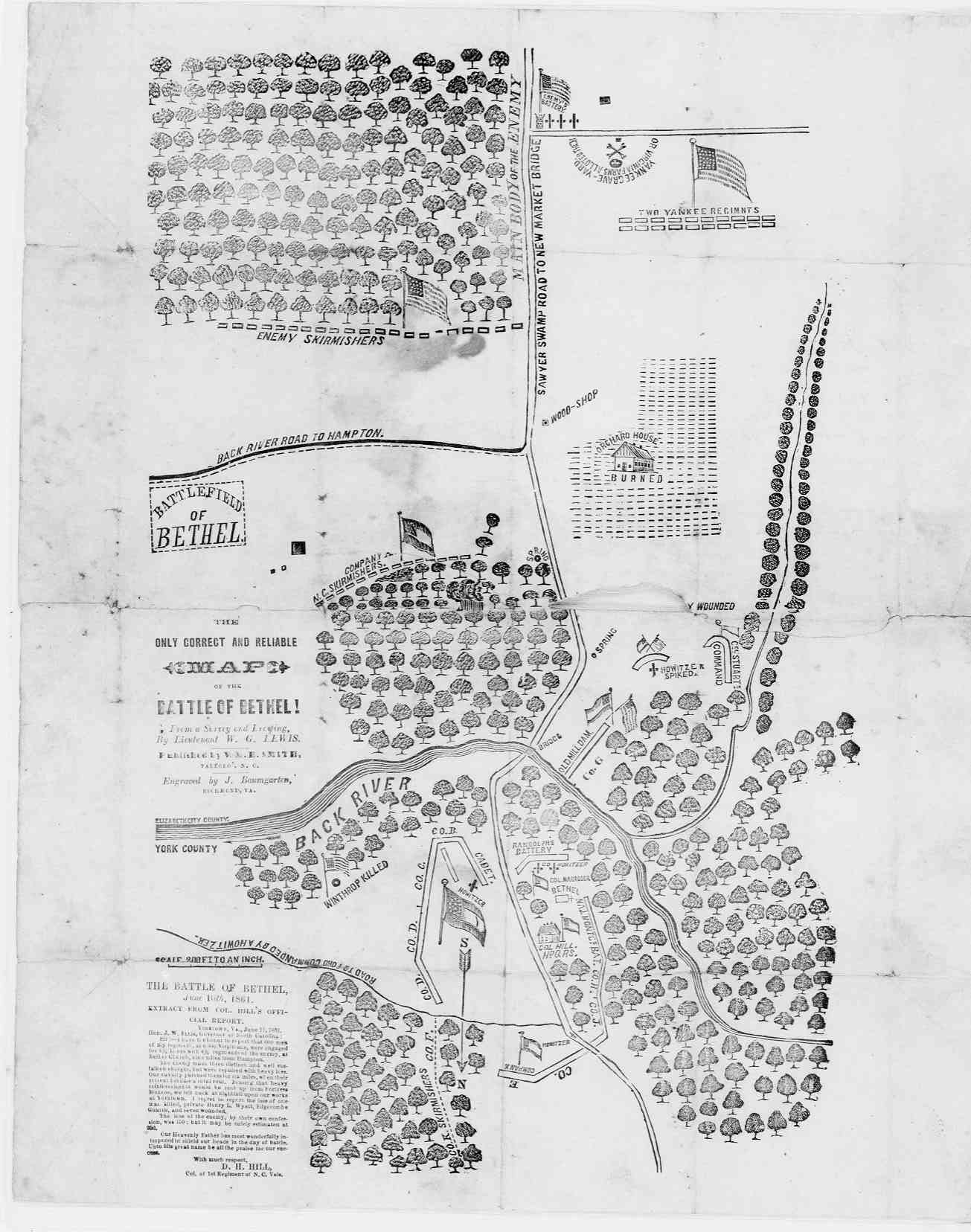
Engagement at Big Bethel Church, June 10, 1861, a historic map

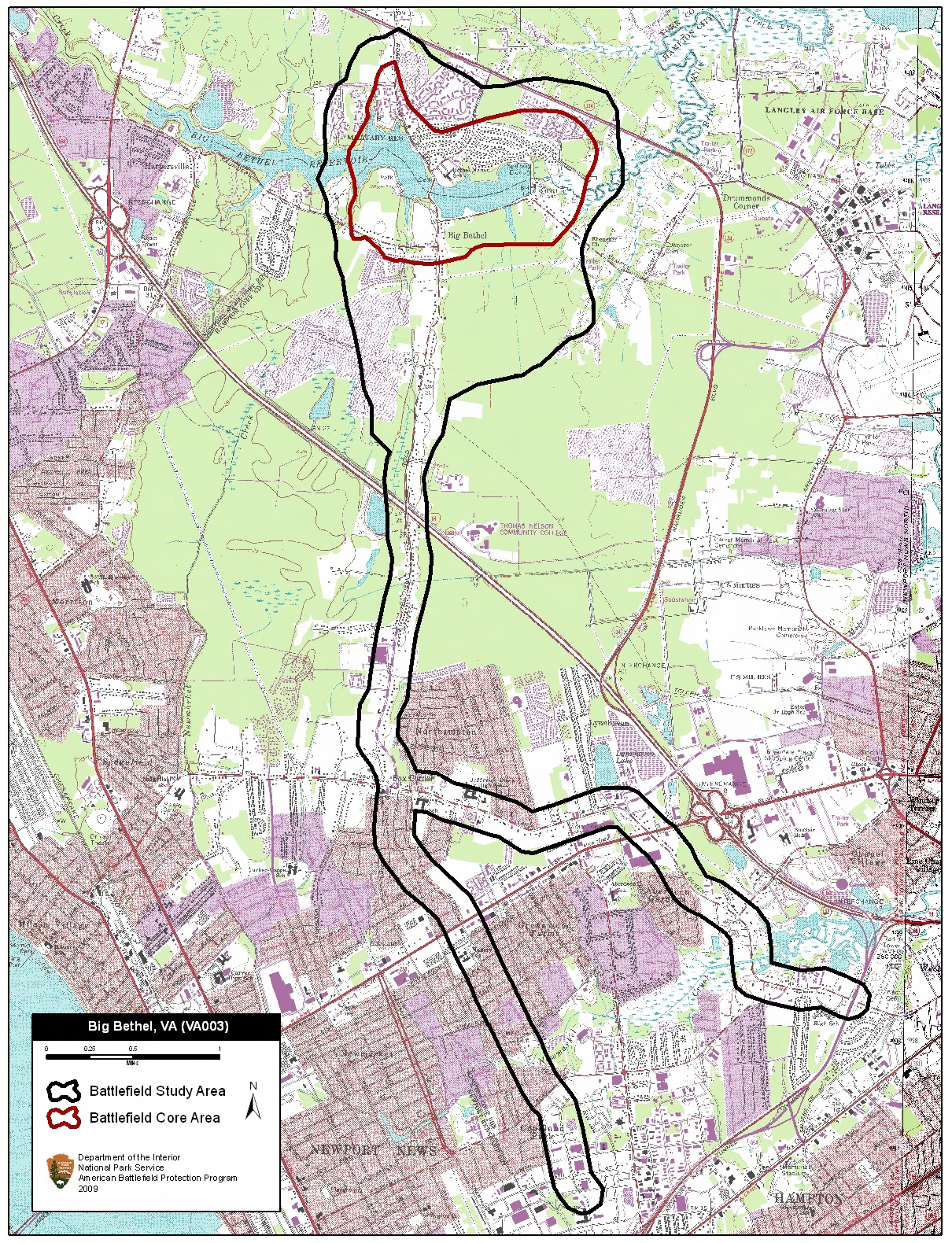
Map of Big Bethel Battlefield core and study areas by the American Battlefield Protection Program

=== Union plan, advance ===
On the night of June 9–10, according to the plan devised by Butler and Winthrop, 3,500 Union soldiers were sent in two columns from Camp Hamilton at Hampton and Camp Butler at Newport News with orders to converge near the Confederate positions at Little Bethel after a night march and launch a surprise attack on the Confederate positions at Little Bethel at dawn. After taking Little Bethel, if the commander of the force chose to do so, he could go on to attack Big Bethel. The entire force was under the immediate overall command of Brigadier General Ebenezer W. Peirce, a Massachusetts militia general of apparent bravery but no regular army, military school or other formal military training or combat experience. Earlier in the day on June 9 Butler had summoned Peirce from Camp Hamilton to Fort Monroe to advise him of the plan. Foreshadowing the further difficulties that would arise during the operation, Peirce was too ill to ride his horse and went to the fort by boat.

Peirce was ordered to first send Colonel Abram Duryee's 5th New York Volunteer Infantry (Duryée's Zouaves) from Camp Hamilton at Hampton to a point between Little Bethel and Big Bethel and then, after having cut the road to Big Bethel, to attack the Confederates at Little Bethel. Colonel Frederick Townsend's 3rd New York Volunteer Infantry Regiment, with two howitzers, was to march from Hampton after the 5th New York Infantry had departed and provide support at Little Bethel. Meanwhile, Colonel John W. Phelps, commanding at Newport News, would send detachments from his own 1st Vermont Infantry and Colonel David W. Wardrop's 4th Massachusetts Volunteer Infantry Regiment (90–day militia) under the command of Lieutenant Colonel Peter T. Washburn to approach Little Bethel from the opposite side. Washburn would be followed by Colonel Bendix's German–speaking 7th New York Infantry Regiment and two artillery pieces manned by regulars from the 2nd U.S. Artillery Regiment, commanded by Lieutenant John T. Greble. The plan was for this force to meet the 3rd New York Infantry under Townsend at a road junction about 1.5 miles (2.4 km) from Little Bethel and form a combined reserve. Peirce and his staff headed for Little Bethel with Townsend's 3rd New York Infantry Regiment.

The column from Camp Hamilton was to start at midnight, and that from Newport News a little later, as its line of march would be shorter. Anticipating possible confusion during a night march by inexperienced troops, Butler ordered the watchword, "Boston," to be given to each column and further ordered that all the troops should wear a white rag or handkerchief on their left arms so they would recognize each other. Any attacking regiment was supposed to first shout the watchword. Butler's aide and messenger to the Newport News command, Captain Haggerty, forgot to advise Phelps and the Newport News contingent of these precautions.

=== Friendly fire incident ===
Colonel Abram Duryée led the 5th New York Volunteer Infantry from their positions at Camp Hamilton and despite some delays arrived near Little Bethel at about 4:00 a.m. Part of this regiment under Captain (later brigadier general) Judson Kilpatrick captured three Confederate pickets before dawn and were in position to continue the advance as planned. Before Duryée's men could advance close enough to the Confederate positions to open the attack, they heard gunfire behind them.

Colonel Bendix's 7th New York Volunteer Infantry had opened fire on Colonel Townsend's 3rd New York Volunteer Infantry Regiment, who were coming up the narrow road from the direction of Hampton to the south. The 3rd New York Infantry was being led down the road by General Peirce and his staff on horseback without an advance guard. Bendix knew that no cavalry was with the Union force and mistook the 3rd New York for a Confederate cavalry regiment. More importantly, the 3rd New York Infantry wore gray uniforms, with white bands on their arms such as had been seen previously on the hats, at least, of Confederates. Bendix, who had not been given the watchword or the instructions on armbands, thought the Confederates were behind his regiment as well as in front and ordered his men to fire upon Townsend's men.

After the attack by Bendix's men, Peirce pulled his force back south of the New Market Bridge, a counter-march of about 1.5 miles (2.4 km) to assess the situation and to await an expected further Confederate attack in a more advantageous position. To the dismay of all, it was soon discovered that Bendix had opened fire with muskets and an artillery piece on the 3rd New York Infantry and the commanding general's party, wounding 21 men (two mortally) and causing dozens of other men to flee the field. At this time, the colonels of various regiments, in particular Duryea and Washburn, advised Peirce to call off the operation. However, Butler's aides, Major Winthrop and Captain Haggerty, urged Peirce to move forward, and he chose to continue with the attack.

At least forty men of the 3rd New York Infantry had fled back to the fort at Hampton where they reported that their regiment was being cut to pieces by a large Confederate force. Before waiting for a request for reinforcement, Colonel William H. Allen then headed north with the 1st New York Volunteer Infantry Regiment to help Townsend's regiment. Peirce also soon sent a message back to Hampton for the 2nd New York Volunteer Infantry Regiment under Colonel Joseph B. Carr to come up to the area. They were ordered to stop at the New Market Bridge and ultimately acted as a rear guard.

Thinking they had been cut off when they heard the gunfire from the road back to Hampton behind them, Duryée's men of the 5th New York Infantry withdrew from their advanced position and headed south to the sound of the guns, as did the other Union troops from the Vermont and Massachusetts regiments under Lieutenant Colonel Washburn. Those troops were approaching Little Bethel in front of the site of the incident. The Union forces had lost the element of surprise for their attack and delayed the timing of it as well.

=== Little Bethel ===
The friendly fire incident alerted the Confederates at Little Bethel, as well as Magruder's main force, of the Union movement. Upon approach of the Union force and the sound of the gunfire from the New York regiments, the approximately 50 Confederates manning the outpost at Little Bethel Church abandoned that position and fell back to their entrenchments behind Marsh Creek (later Brick Kiln Creek), the branch of the Back River near Big Bethel Church. As it had turned out, only this small group was stationed at Little Bethel, not the large force that Butler expected to find there. Gordon, in discussing the mistakes of the Union commanders in this operation says: "But behind all this was the most serious mistake of all – a mistake in Butler's plan. The Confederates had no outpost of strength at Little Bethel, and the scheme to surround and capture it was an attack on a man of straw." He says that Butler could have struck the road to Yorktown 3 miles (4.8 km) north of Big Bethel and compelled Magruder to withdraw to Yorktown without firing a shot. The 5th New York Infantry (Duryee's Zouaves) had again been sent by Peirce as the leading regiment. Finding the Confederates were in flight from Little Bethel, the 5th New York Infantry burned the church at Little Bethel so the Confederates could not use it as an outpost and also set fire to the homes of several secessionists. The Union force then continued toward Big Bethel.

=== Confederate advance, return to Big Bethel ===
By chance, Magruder had started a large part of his force toward Hampton to launch a surprise attack of his own on the Union forces. After hearing the gunfire and being alerted by an elderly local lady that a Union force was only a few hundred yards down the road, Magruder hurried his men back to his fortifications at Big Bethel. The Confederates were now fully alerted to the Union Army movement and were able to get back into position well before Peirce's men arrived at Big Bethel.

Almost the entire Confederate force was now behind earthworks and north of Marsh Creek (Brick Kiln Creek), the branch of the Back River at Big Bethel. The exception was that some of the 3rd Virginia Infantry were in an open field to the south of the branch to protect a howitzer position which was intended to block the main Yorktown–Hampton road. These men hurriedly tried to entrench and to find other cover, such as old mill dam, as the Union force approached. The Confederate force consisted of the same units that Magruder had sent to Big Bethel a few days earlier: Colonel Hill's 1st North Carolina Volunteer Infantry (about 800 men), three companies of Lieutenant Colonel William D. Stuart's 3rd Virginia Infantry (208 men), a cavalry battalion of about 100 men under Major Montague, and the Richmond Howitzer Artillery Battalion of about 150 men under Major George W. Randolph.

=== Union attacks at Big Bethel ===
Having determined to continue to Big Bethel without knowledge of the layout or strength of the Confederate positions, Peirce sent Duryee's 5th New York Infantry out first. Captain Kilpatrick along with Captain Charles G. Bartlett and skirmishers were sent forward to scout the Confederate position. They returned to the main body of the Union force and, after observation and talking to a black man and a local woman as well, told the officers in command that the Confederates had between 3,000 and 5,000 men and 30 pieces of artillery. They actually had about 1,400–1,500 men and 5 artillery pieces, but Kilpatrick accurately reported that their position was well fortified. If the Union forces had not done enough already to give up their plan and position, Kilpatrick gave notice of the arrival of the Union force at Big Bethel by shooting at Confederate scouts and pickets. As the Union force came up to the field, they could not see the Confederates behind their fortifications but the Confederates also did not have a good view of the Union force because of the shade from the woods behind the field on the right and small buildings on the left. However, they could see the bayonets and flag of a Union force about 0.5 miles (0.80 km) to the left. Major Randolph, commanding the howitzer battalion, fired a shot at this column which ricocheted through the Union line and killed a soldier standing next to Colonel Bendix.

The two forces then began an intermittent fight that began at 9:00 a.m. and lasted until 1:30 p.m. After the initial artillery shot, Bendix's men began to scatter into the trees for protection. The 5th New York Infantry under Colonel Duryee charged the left of the forward Confederate position with the apparent ultimate intent of crossing the stream and turning the Confederate flank but they were quickly discouraged and turned back by heavy Confederate fire. Lieutenant Greble came up the road to place his three guns where he and his small detachment of regulars from the 2nd U.S. Artillery Regiment could return fire, which he did resolutely but with little effect. Peirce then positioned the 5th New York (Duryee), 7th New York (Bendix) and the Massachusetts and Vermont companies (Washburn) to the right of the Hampton Road and the 3rd New York (Townsend) and 1st New York (Allen) to the left of the road. He would launch piecemeal attacks from these positions. Greble continued to fire at the Confederate positions while Peirce arranged his force and gave them some time to rest.

Union skirmishers went forward to try to determine the strength of the Confederate position. Most were driven back immediately. Two companies from the 5th New York led by Captain Kilpatrick and Captain John G. Butler, the General's nephew, advanced across an open field with only a few trees, a shed, and a house for cover. An artillery shot went through the house and killed one of the men. Around noon, the 3rd New York Infantry led by Colonel Townsend came forward to the skirmishers' position. They tried to attack the forward Confederate position but could advance only to within 500 feet (150 m) before being forced to lay down due to the heavy Confederate fire. Townsend feared he was being flanked and began to withdraw just as the Confederate howitzer facing his position broke and the Confederate commander in the redoubt, Colonel Stuart, pulled his 200 men of the 3rd Virginia Infantry back to a hill near the church. Stuart also feared he was being flanked. Part of the 5th New York Infantry which was attacking alongside the 3rd New York temporarily seized this position but were unable to hold it. Townsend had nothing to fear from the men on his left because they were a company of his own regiment who had become separated from the main body. By the time this was discovered, Townsend had pulled back. Magruder did not want to give up the advantageous forward position and sent Stuart back with another howitzer and reinforcements from the 1st North Carolina Volunteer Infantry Regiment. This Confederate move and Townsend's retreat left the 5th New York unsupported and they had to withdraw from their captured position as well. Renewed fire from the regained Confederate position ensured that neither Townsend nor Duryee would move forward against this position again.

Meanwhile, Kilpatrick was trying to lead part of the 5th New York around the Confederates from the right but they came under heavy fire. As men were falling, Lieutenant Colonel (later major general) Gouverneur K. Warren came forward on a white mule and began to lead the men toward a ford through the creek 0.75 miles (1.21 km) from the main road to Hampton. A platoon guarding the ford was outnumbered by the Union force and retreated as they approached. Magruder ordered Captain W. H. Werth forward with a howitzer company. Werth hurried to the ford and arrived before the Zouaves of the 5th New York Infantry under Duryee and Kilpatrick. Werth drove them off from the ford with a howitzer shot but they continued to fight from the wood line. Grape shot tore the rectangle off Colonel Duryee's left shoulder, wounded Captain Kilpatrick in the thigh, and killed a soldier behind them. The 5th New York Infantry was exhausted from being the first unit on the march and from heavy action in the day's fighting so the unit was pulled back. Kilpatrick, who was badly wounded by the shot through his thigh, had to be rescued and carried away by Captain Winslow at the very end of the battle after his regiment had withdrawn. Otherwise, he would have fallen into Confederate hands.

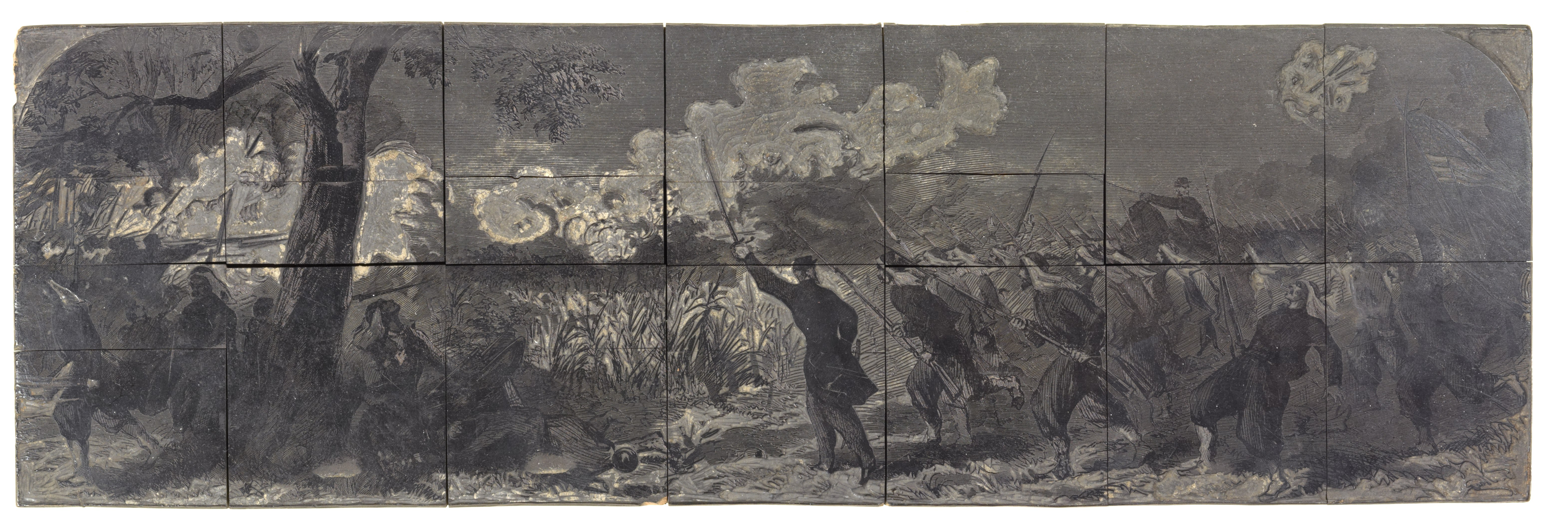
Last charge of the Duryea's Zouaves, by Thomas Nast, 1861

=== Deaths of Winthrop, Wyatt, Greble; end of battle ===
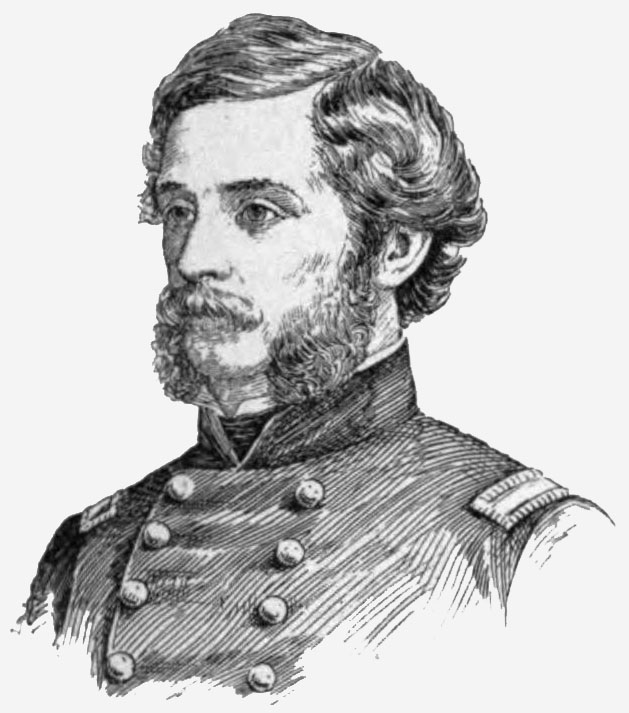
Maj. Theodore Winthrop, a noted American writer and Union officer, was killed in the Battle of Big Bethel

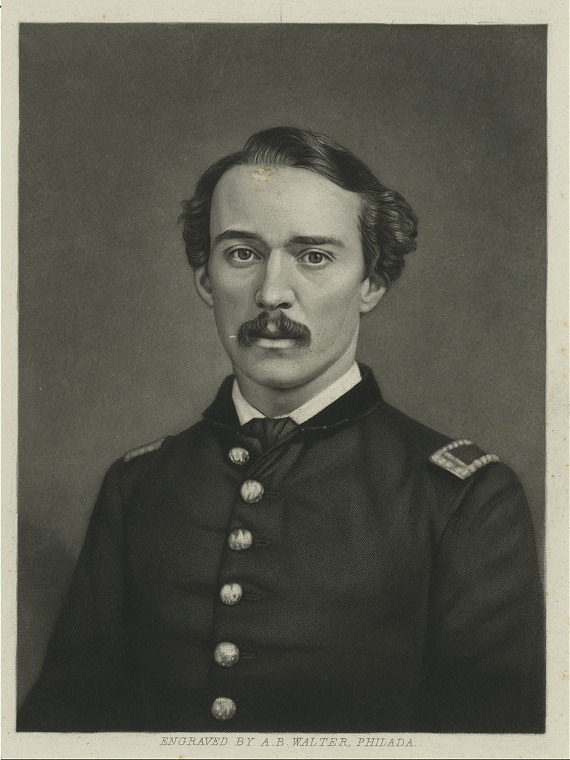
Lieut. John Trout Greble

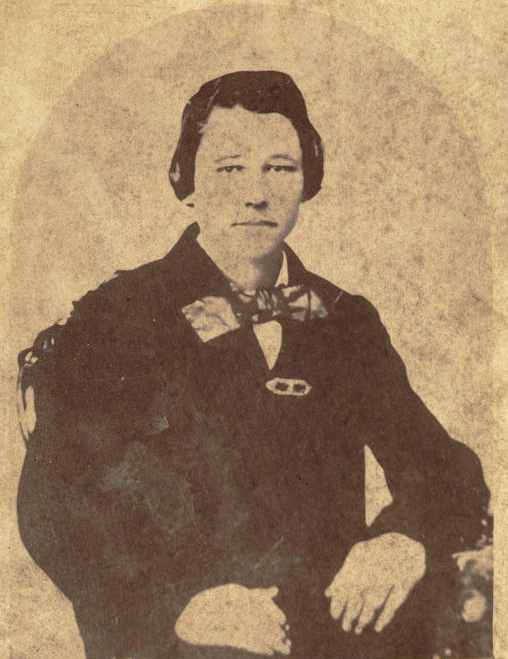
Pvt. Henry L. Wyatt, the first Confederate soldier from North Carolina to be killed in the Civil War

The 5th New York Infantry was replaced for one last assault on the Union right by Major Winthrop, who was also an officer of the 7th New York Infantry but was serving on the staff of General Peirce, having been detailed from General Butler's staff since he helped Butler plan the attack. Winthrop led a detachment of troops from the 5th New York, 1st Vermont, and 4th Massachusetts infantry regiments. Though very tired from the night march and increasingly hot day, Winthrop and his force attempted to turn the Confederate left flank (from the Union right). Unlike the earlier unsuccessful Union attempts to cross the creek, Winthrop and his men crossed the creek uncontested because they tied their white cloths around their hats and pretended to be part of the Confederate force. Then they cheered and ran forward, somewhat prematurely giving away their identity. Two companies of the 1st North Carolina Infantry then turned to face them and their fire turned the Union force back with several casualties. One was Major Winthrop who had jumped onto a log and yelled "come on boys, one charge and the day is ours." These were his last words as he sustained a bullet through his heart while his men fled back across the creek. After the battle, Colonel Hill praised Winthrop's courage while disparaging the efforts of the rest of the Union soldiers.

Advanced Union skirmishers continued to fire at the Confederate positions from the house on the field and other outbuildings on the south side of the creek. Colonel Hill asked four volunteers to go forward and burn the house. Fire from across the main road stopped them and they dove to the ground. One of them, Private Henry Lawson Wyatt, had been killed. The others were called back and soon Major Randolph was able to destroy the house with artillery fire. Lieutenant Greble, whose guns had been hidden by the house, continued to fire and exposed his position. By this time the battle was ending and Peirce ordered all of his force to retire. It was clear that the Confederate position was too strong and his troops were too exhausted to continue a costly and increasingly futile attack.

Lieutenant John Trout Greble refused to pull back until the last, continuing to work his remaining gun, for he did not have enough able men left to man them both. This effort cost him his life as the Confederate artillery concentrated on his position and he was struck in the back of the head by a cannonball while finally winding up his work. When they received word of Greble's death, Lieutenant Colonel Warren, Captain Wilson, and five of their men rushed back to recover Greble's body before they left the field. Greble was the first graduate of West Point and the first U.S. Regular Army officer killed in the war. After littering the road back to Fort Monroe with coats and equipment on a very hot afternoon, the Union troops arrived back at Fort Monroe about 5:00 p.m. that afternoon. About 100 Confederate cavalry pursued the Union force but could not mount an attack and pulled back as they approached Hampton because the Union force had pulled up the New Market Bridge over the southern branch of the Back River to thwart the Confederate pursuit.

== Aftermath ==
Total Federal casualties at the Battle of Big Bethel and the friendly fire incident that preceded it were 76, including 18 killed, 53 wounded, and 5 missing. Poland, 2006, p. 238 gives an account of the Union casualties by regiment as follows: Staff: 1 killed (Winthrop); 4th Massachusetts: 1 killed; 1st New York: 1 killed; 2d New York: 2 killed, 1 wounded; 3rd New York: 2 killed, 27 wounded or missing; 5th New York: 6 killed, 13 wounded; 7th New York: 3 killed, 7 wounded, 2 missing; 1st Vermont: 2 killed, 3 wounded, 1 missing; Second U.S. Artillery: 1 killed (Greble).

Union forces attempted no further advance on the Virginia Peninsula until the Peninsula Campaign of 1862. However, Butler did send an expedition up the Back River with naval support on June 24, 1861, which destroyed 14 transports and several small boats that had supplies for the Confederate forces, and small skirmishes such as that at Smith's Farm and Cedar Lane occurred between the two armies. Both sides generally continued to hold and improve their positions and works until the Peninsula campaign began.

Butler soon had to return many of his men to Washington to reinforce the defeated Union force after the First Battle of Bull Run as fear for the security of the capital ran high. While Butler continued to maintain the camp at Newport News, he had to abandon the camp at Hampton for lack of men. When Magruder discovered this, on August 7, 1861, a Confederate force burned Hampton so it could no longer be used to shelter runaway slaves. Butler did not attempt to shell the Confederates from the fort for fear he would be blamed, at least in part, for the burning of the town due to cannon fire.

Butler was criticized for the debacle at Big Bethel, including his decision not to lead the operation in person. His appointment as major general of volunteers was confirmed by the U.S. Senate by only two votes. Most of the criticism fell on the Massachusetts militia general, Ebenezer Peirce. Many of the men even wrote to newspapers and others to condemn Peirce's handling of the operation, lack of coordination of forces, sporadic efforts at fighting, wasting of time, and leaving too much discretion to subordinates. Even Butler spoke of Peirce's shortcomings in handling the matter, although in more restrained language than he is reported to have used in private.

In the early stages of the war, uniforms had not been standardized, and some Union units wore some items of clothing that were gray, though gray had also begun to be adopted by the Confederate Army. William Y. W. Ripley, a company commander in the 1st Vermont who later received the Medal of Honor for heroism at the Battle of Malvern Hill while fighting with the 1st United States Sharpshooters, said a primary lesson for Union Army leaders was that "...the gray overcoats and soft hats had to go, lest they (Union soldiers) be shot by their own troops."

The Confederates suffered only one killed and seven wounded.

Major Winthrop and several other Union dead were buried on the field by the Confederates. Soon thereafter, Magruder granted a request by Winthrop's brother and Union officers, under a flag of truce, to recover Winthrop's body. They returned the body to the field with a respectful escort.

Major Randolph's artillery and Colonel D. H. Hill's 1st North Carolina infantry troops were commended by Magruder for their actions. Within hours of the battle, Magruder withdrew his forces to Yorktown, where he established a line protected by the Warwick River. Magruder feared another larger and better-planned Union attack on his position and felt he should maintain his defense at Yorktown and along the Warwick River. The press in the Confederate States in particular made the Confederate victory appear to be more momentous than it was and greatly exaggerated the number of Union soldiers killed in the battle, a common reaction by both sides to battles in 1861.

At the time, the outcome of the battle was an important boost to Southern confidence and morale. Along with the Confederate victory at the Battle of First Bull Run (Battle of First Manassas) six weeks later, it provided what proved to be undue encouragement and confidence in a quick victory in the war to the Confederates. Union morale was correspondingly damaged but as events proved, the Northern public and military showed resilience and determination in the face of several early defeats.

== Historiography ==
=== First Confederate death ===
Many authors have stated that Private Henry L. Wyatt of the 1st North Carolina Volunteers, later the 11th North Carolina Infantry Regiment, the only Confederate soldier killed in the battle, was the first Confederate soldier killed in combat in the Civil War. This is only correct to the extent a distinction is made between the first officer killed, Captain John Quincy Marr, who was killed at the Battle of Fairfax Court House (June 1861) on June 1, 1861, and the first enlisted man killed, which Private Wyatt appears to have been.

=== Claim as first land battle of the American Civil War ===
Big Bethel was one of the first Civil War land battles both in present-day Virginia and in the war after the bombardment and surrender of Fort Sumter. Although arguments have been made that either the Battle of Philippi, on June 3, 1861, in present-day West Virginia (then part of Virginia) or the Battle of Big Bethel was the first land battle of the entire war, the Battle of Fairfax Court House (June 1861) took place in Fairfax County, Virginia on June 1, 1861, two days earlier than the Battle of Philippi and nine days before the Battle of Big Bethel. Historian David J. Eicher discounts both the Battle of Fairfax Court House and the Battle of Philippi as "mere skirmishes" and says the first "real land battle of the conflict" was the Battle of Big Bethel, although, after a brief summary of the Battle of Big Bethel, he characterizes the early Civil War engagements without apparent distinction as "these first minor skirmishes." The Baltimore riot of April 19, 1861 might also be considered a small Civil War battle, with several killed and wounded on each side, but the Confederate side in the affair was a civilian mob, not an organized military force like the force the mob attacked, which was several companies of the 6th Massachusetts Militia. Civilian mobs also were engaged with military forces in two similar riots in St. Louis in the early days of the war after the surrender of Fort Sumter. Compared to the large battles to come, all the engagements before the Battle of First Bull Run (Battle of First Manassas) are fairly characterized as mere skirmishes.

== Commemoration and battlefield preservation ==
Most of the Big Bethel battlefield, and the whole Little Bethel site, have not been preserved. Today the sites are generally covered with residential and commercial development. Marsh Creek or Brick Kiln Creek has also been dammed, creating the Big Bethel Reservoir on the battlefield site. The fragments of the site that remain are not readily identifiable. The site of Lt. Greble's death is now a convenience store. A group of local preservationists has developed a plan to preserve areas, currently located on Langley Air Force Base, containing a remnant of an earthwork and the memorial to Henry Lawson Wyatt, the only Confederate soldier killed in the battle.
