= Erastus W. Jewett =

Military officer during American Civil War

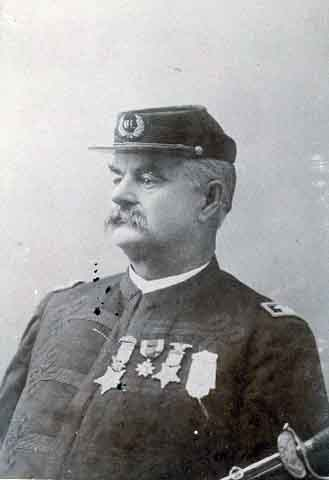
- Born: April 1, 1839; St. Albans, Vermont, US
- Died: February 20, 1906 (aged 66); Burlington, Vermont, US
- Burial place: Church Street Cemetery, Swanton, Vermont, US
- Military career
- Allegiance: United States (Union)
- Branch: Union Army (Army of the James); Vermont Militia
- Service years: 1862-1864 (Army); 1882-1892 (Militia)
- Rank: First Lieutenant (Army); Colonel (Militia)
- Units: Company A, 9th Vermont Infantry; Staff of the Adjutant General of Vermont
- Conflicts: American Civil War: Harper's Ferry; Newport Barracks; Chaffin's Farm; Fair Oaks
- Awards: Medal of Honor

Erastus W. Jewett (April 1, 1836 – February 20, 1906) was a Medal of Honor recipient who fought in the 9th Vermont Infantry during the American Civil War.

== Early life ==
Jewett was born in St. Albans, Vermont on April 1, 1836, the son of Eleazer Jewett and Dorothy (Abell) Jewett. Jewett had nine brothers and sisters, including Albert Burton Jewett, who commanded the 10th Vermont Infantry as a colonel, and Jesse A. Jewett, a captain in the 5th Vermont Infantry, who died in Swanton shortly after the war as the result of an illness he contracted during his military service.

Erastus Jewett was educated in St. Albans, and worked as a surveyor in the years prior to the American Civil War.

== Civil War ==
In June 1862, Jewett joined the Union Army to fight in the Civil War, and was commissioned as a second lieutenant in the 9th Vermont Infantry. On August 3, he was captured, and remained a prisoner of the Confederacy for 25 days. Jewett was promoted to first lieutenant in May 1863. During his service, he took part in the battles of Harper's Ferry (September 13 and 15, 1862), Newport Barracks (February 2, 1864), Chaffin's Farm (September 29, 1864), and Fair Oaks (October 27, 1864). He resigned in November 1864, and returned to Vermont.

== Medal of Honor ==
He was awarded the Medal of Honor, his nations' highest military award, for his actions in holding off the enemy during the retreat of the garrison during the Battle of Newport Barracks on February 2, 1864. This award was presented on September 8, 1891.

"By long and persistent resistance and burning the bridges kept a superior force of the enemy at a distance and thus covered the retreat of the garrison."

== Later life ==
Jewett resided in Swanton, where he was engaged in the production and sale of hay and lime. He was also active in the manufacture of metal goods, including buckles and wire. Jewett continued his military service as a member of the Vermont Militia's headquarters staff from 1882 to 1892, including general inspector and inspector of rifle practice, and he attained the rank of colonel. He was involved in local politics as a Republican, and held several town and village offices, including village president. Jewett was a member of the Grand Army of the Republic, the Swanton post of which was named for his brother Jesse. When Wheelock G. Veazey was the GAR's national Commander-in-Chief from 1890 to 1891, Jewett served on his staff as aide-de-camp with the rank of colonel. Jewett was also active in the Military Order of the Loyal Legion of the United States, the Sons of the Revolution, and the Freemasons.

== Death and burial ==
Jewett retired in 1902 and was a resident of Burlington. On February 20, 1906, he was on his way to a local Grand Army of the Republic meeting when he became ill. He returned to his home, and died soon afterwards. Jewett was buried at Church Street Cemetery in Swanton.

== Family ==
Jewett was the husband of Fanny L. Brigham (d. 1882) of St. Albans. Their children included Jessie, Mary, Nellie, and Walter.

== See also ==
- List of Medal of Honor recipients
