= Peter T. Washburn =

American lawyer, politician and soldier (1814–1870)

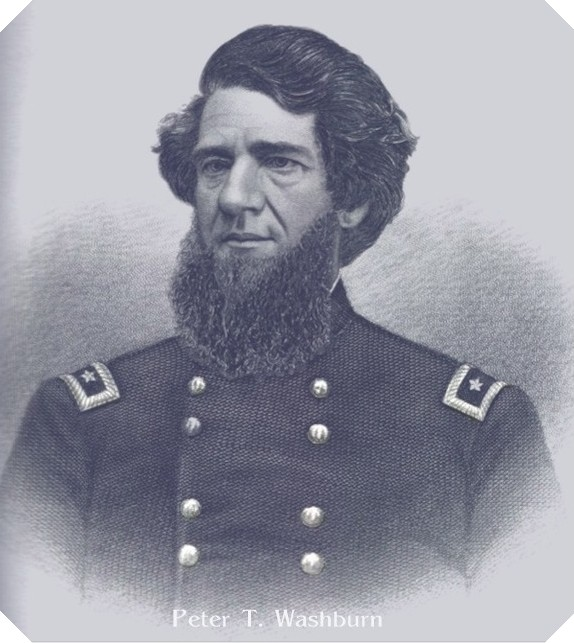
- Engraving circa 1865 by Henry Bryan Hall and Sons (New York, NY)

31st Governor of Vermont
- In office October 15, 1869 – February 7, 1870
- Lieutenant: George W. Hendee
- Preceded by: John B. Page
- Succeeded by: George W. Hendee

Member of the Vermont House of Representatives from Woodstock
- In office 1853–1855
- Preceded by: Thomas E. Powers
- Succeeded by: Thomas E. Powers

Reporter of Decisions for the Vermont Supreme Court
- In office 1844–1852
- Preceded by: William Slade
- Succeeded by: John F. Deane

Assistant Clerk of the Vermont House of Representatives
- In office 1840–1842
- Preceded by: Ambrose L. Brown
- Succeeded by: William C. Bradlee

Personal details
- Born: September 7, 1814 Lynn, Massachusetts, US
- Died: February 7, 1870 (aged 55) Woodstock, Vermont, US
- Resting place: River Street Cemetery, Woodstock, Vermont, US
- Party: Whig (before 1855); Republican (from 1855)
- Spouse(s): Almira E. Ferris; Almira P. Hopkins
- Children: 5
- Education: Dartmouth College
- Profession: Attorney
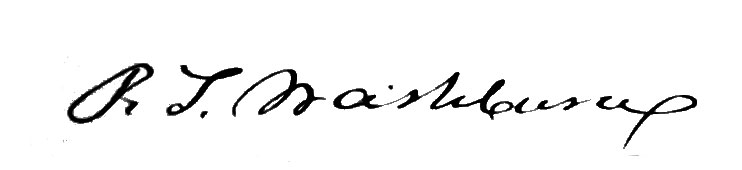
- Signature

Military service
- Allegiance: United States; Union (American Civil War)
- Branch/service: Vermont Militia; Union Army
- Years of service: 1837–1841, 1857–1861, 1861–1866 (Militia); 1861 (Army)
- Rank: Brigadier General
- Commands: 25th Regiment (Militia); Woodstock Light Infantry Company (Militia); Adjutant General of Vermont
- Battles/wars: American Civil War: Battle of Big Bethel; St. Albans Raid

Peter Thacher Washburn (September 7, 1814 – February 7, 1870) was a Vermont lawyer, politician and soldier. A veteran of the American Civil War, he served as the 31st governor of Vermont as a Republican from 1869 to 1870, and was the second Vermont Governor to die in office.

Washburn was a native of Lynn, Massachusetts, and was raised in Ludlow, Vermont. He graduated from Dartmouth College in 1835, and taught school while studying law. He was admitted to the bar in 1838, and practiced first in Ludlow and then in Woodstock, while also becoming active in politics as a Whig. In addition to campaigning for Whigs including William Henry Harrison, Washburn held elected and appointed offices, including Reporter of Decisions for the Vermont Supreme Court and member of the Vermont House of Representatives.

In Woodstock, Washburn also was active in the Vermont Militia; he was commander of a regiment with the rank of colonel from the late 1830s through the 1840s, and in 1857 he organized a company in anticipation of the American Civil War, which he commanded as a captain. Washburn's company was federalized in 1861 as part of the 1st Vermont Infantry; he was commissioned as the regiment's lieutenant colonel and second-in-command. He became the de facto commander after John W. Phelps was promoted to command of a brigade, and he led the regiment in the Battle of Big Bethel. In late 1861 Washburn was elected adjutant general of Vermont, and he organized Vermont's participation in the Civil War until its completion, including the state's response to the St. Albans Raid. As adjutant general Washburn kept track of the over 34,000 Vermont men who enlisted in the Union Army.

In 1869, Washburn was the successful Republican nominee for governor. He served from October 15 until his death on February 7, 1870. His death in Woodstock was attributed to exhaustion caused by overwork.

== Early life ==
Washburn was born in Lynn, Massachusetts, on September 7, 1814, the son of Judge Reuben and Hannah Blaney (Thacher) Washburn. Judge Washburn's grandfather Seth Washburn was a Colonel in the American Revolution. Seth's son Asa Washburn, the Governor's grandfather, moved from Massachusetts to Putney, Vermont in 1785. Judge Reuben Washburn settled in Ludlow, Vermont in 1825. Washburn attended the public schools of Ludlow and Black River Academy, then attended Dartmouth College. He graduated in 1835, and was a member of Phi Beta Kappa. He was principal of the Haverhill Academy while studying law under his father in Ludlow, and with William Upham in Montpelier. After completing his legal education with a year at Harvard Law School, in 1838 Washburn was admitted to the bar, and he began practicing law in Ludlow in January 1839.

Active in politics as a Whig, Washburn was one of the secretaries of a Windsor County convention organized to support William Henry Harrison in the 1840 presidential election. From 1840 to 1842, Washburn served as Assistant Clerk of the Vermont House of Representatives.

In 1844, Washburn moved to Woodstock and formed a partnership with Charles P. Marsh, which they maintained until Washburn's death in 1870. Also in 1844, Washburn was elected reporter of decisions of the Vermont Supreme Court, a position he held for eight years. He represented Woodstock in the Vermont House of Representatives from 1853 to 1855. Washburn was also involved in civic causes, including becoming active in the temperance movement. He became active in the Republican Party in 1855; He was a delegate to the 1860 Republican National Convention, and served as chairman of the Vermont delegation.

== Civil War ==
Washburn had served as colonel of a Vermont militia regiment from 1837 until 1841, and in 1857 he organized the Woodstock Light Infantry company, which he commanded as a captain. In 1861, Washburn's unit was mustered into federal service for the American Civil War as Company B, 1st Vermont Infantry. He was commissioned lieutenant colonel and second in command of the regiment on May 9, 1861.

The commander of the 1st Vermont, John W. Phelps, was soon promoted to brigadier general and command of a brigade, so Washburn was the regiment's de facto commander during nearly all of its three months of service at Fortress Monroe and Newport News, Virginia. Washburn also commanded five companies of the 1st Vermont and five from the 4th Massachusetts infantry at the Battle of Big Bethel on June 10, 1861. He was mustered out with his regiment on August 15, 1861.

== Later career ==
In October 1861, the Vermont General Assembly elected Washburn to succeed Horace Henry Baxter as Adjutant General and Inspector General of the state militia with the rank of brigadier general. During his tenure, he oversaw the raising, equipping and fielding of seven infantry regiments, one cavalry regiment, three batteries of light artillery, and two companies of sharpshooters for the Union Army.

Washburn also took charge of Vermont's response following the October 1864 St. Albans Raid by Confederate soldiers based in Canada. The state responded by organizing the Frontier Cavalry and deploying it to patrol the Canadian border with Vermont and New York, and Vermont's contingent included two companies, one based in Burlington, and one in St. Albans.

Under Washburn's leadership, the adjutant general's office compiled 300 bound volumes of commander's reports, financial accounts and other records pertaining to service members from Vermont who took part in the war. Of the more than 34,000 men Vermont provided to the Union, only 75 were unaccounted for after the war.

In 1866, Washburn declined reelection as adjutant general. He was succeeded by William Wells. Later that year, Washburn was a candidate for the Republican nomination in Vermont's 2nd congressional district; he lost to Luke P. Poland, who went on to win the general election. In October 1866, the town of Derby dedicated Vermont's first monument to commemorate Union veterans; Washburn was the featured guest and delivered the keynote address. In May 1867, though he was not an active candidate, Washburn was nominated for lieutenant governor at the state Republican convention. The nomination was won by Stephen Thomas, who went on to win the general election. In March 1868, Washburn was chosen president and secretary of the state Republican convention that elected delegates to that year's Republican National Convention.

In August 1868, Washburn was a delegate to the International Commercial Convention (ICC) in Portland, Maine, and was chosen one of its vice presidents. The ICC considered ways to expand commerce between the United States and Canada, in addition to developing overseas shipping routes for farm products from the Western United States. Washburn was one of the organizers of the Reunion Society of Vermont Officers and delivered the keynote address at the society's 1868 annual meeting. In addition to resuming his law practice after leaving the adjutant general's post, Washburn was an organizer of the Woodstock Railroad Company, of which he was elected president. He also served on the board of directors for the Rutland and Woodstock Railroad.

== Governor ==
In 1869, Washburn was a candidate for governor and won the Republican nomination at the party's state convention in June by defeating Dudley Chase Denison and Julius Converse. He defeated Democrat Homer W. Heaton in the general election, and took office on October 15, 1869. During his term, the state enacted a law changing the term for state offices including governor from one year to two.

As governor, Washburn issued a militia commission to Ann Eliza Smith, the wife of former Governor J. Gregory Smith, who served from 1863 to 1865. The Smiths were residents of St. Albans, and Smith had been in the state capital of Montpelier on the day of the St. Albans Raid. His home was a target, and when Mrs. Smith appeared in the front doorway carrying an unloaded pistol (the only weapon she could find), the raiders decided to bypass the house. Mrs. Smith then worked to organize the people of St. Albans to mount a pursuit of the raiders, which unsuccessfully attempted to prevent them from escaping to Canada. Washburn recognized her heroism by appointing her as a brevet lieutenant colonel on the adjutant general's military staff.

== Death and burial ==
Washburn died in Woodstock on February 7, 1870. Doctors could not find a cause, and attributed his death to nervous exhaustion brought on by overwork. He was interred at River Street Cemetery in Woodstock.

== Family ==
In 1839, Washburn was married to Almira E. Ferris (1816–1848) of Swanton, Vermont. In 1849, he married Almira P. Hopkins (1816–1910) of Glens Falls, New York. With his first wife Washburn was the father of son Ferris (1842–1860), who died at age 18 while a student at Dartmouth College, and daughter Emily May ("Emma"), who died at age 6 (1846–1853). With his second wife, Washburn was the father of four children, including Thacher (1859–1862), who died as an infant. Daughter Elizabeth (1852–1938), the wife of Thomas Wilson Dorr Worthen survived him, as did daughter Mary (1854–1941), the wife of George B. Parkinson, and son Charles (1856–1904).

Washburn was a descendant of James Chilton through Chilton's daughter Mary. As a result of this family connection, Washburn's surviving children became members of the Society of Mayflower Descendants when it was founded in the late 1800s.

== Sources ==
=== Books ===
- Dartmouth College (1844). Catalogue of the Fraternity of Phi Beta Kappa, Alpha of New Hampshire. Hanover, NH: Dartmouth Press.
- Harvard University (1838). Catalogue of the Officers and Students of Harvard University. Cambridge, MA: Folsom, Wells, and Thurston.
- Miller, Richard F. (2013). States at War. Vol. 1. Hanover, NH: University Press of New England. ISBN 978-1-61168-324-0.
- Reno, Conrad (1901). Memoirs of the Judiciary and the Bar of New England for the Nineteenth Century. Vol. II: Vermont. Boston, MA: Century Memorial Publishing Company.
- Society of Mayflower Descendants in the State of Ohio (1913). Register of the Society of Mayflower Descendants in the State of Ohio. Washington, DC: General Society of Mayflower Descendants.
- Ullery, Jacob G. (1894). Men of Vermont Illustrated. Brattleboro, VT: Transcript Publishing Company.

=== Internet ===
- "Historic Record of Vermont Civil War Hero and Governor Discovered". UCL Online. Ludlow, VT: United Church of Ludlow. April 29, 2012.
- "River Street Cemetery, Woodstock". voca58.org. Burlington, VT: Vermont Old Cemetery Association. 2015.

=== Magazines ===
- Clark, Dorus (October 1, 1871). "Necrology: Peter Thacher Washburn". New-England Historical and Genealogical Register. Vol. XXV, no. 4. Boston, MA: New-England Historical, Genealogical Society.

=== Newspapers ===
- "Military Convention". The Vermont Mercury. Rutland, Vermont. 27 October 1837 – via Newspapers.com.
- "The Windsor County Young Men's Whig Convention". The Vermont Mercury. Rutland, Vermont. 28 February 1840 – via Newspapers.com.
- "Government of Vermont, 1840-41: Legislative; House of Representatives". The Vermont Mercury. Rutland, Vermont. 30 October 1840 – via Newspapers.com.
- "Military Convention". Citizen Soldier. Norwich, Vermont. 29 January 1841 – via Newspapers.com.
- "Legislature of Vermont: House". Spirit of the Age. Woodstock, Vermont. 26 October 1843 – via Newspapers.com.
- "State Temperance Convention". Vermont Christian Messenger. Montpelier, Vermont. 31 January 1855 – via Newspapers.com.
- "Our County Convention". Vermont Journal. Windsor, Vermont. 17 August 1855 – via Newspapers.com.
- "A Light Infantry Company Has Been Organized in Woodstock". Vermont Journal. Windsor, Vermont. 21 August 1857 – via Newspapers.com.
- "First Vt. Regiment". The Burlington Free Press. Burlington, Vermont. 16 August 1861 – via Newspapers.com.
- "Guerrilla Raid in Vermont!". The Burlington Free Press. Burlington, Vermont. 28 October 1864 – via Newspapers.com.
- Washburn, Peter T. (2 January 1865). "General Order No. 6: Frontier Cavalry". The Daily Times. Burlington, Vermont – via Newspapers.com.
- "The Vermont Legislature". Vermont Record. Brandon, Vermont. 20 October 1866 – via Newspapers.com.
- "The Nomination of Judge Poland". Green Mountain Freeman. Montpelier, Vermont. 15 August 1866 – via Newspapers.com.
- "Soldiers Monument at Derby". The Burlington Times. Burlington, Vermont. 9 November 1866 – via Newspapers.com.
- "Republican State Convention". The Burlington Free Press. Burlington, Vermont. 31 May 1867 – via Newspapers.com.
- "Republican State Convention for Nominating Delegates". Vermont Journal and Farmer. Windsor, Vermont. 21 March 1868 – via Newspapers.com.
- "International Convention". The Portland Daily Press. Portland, Maine. 5 August 1868 – via Newspapers.com.
- "Re-Union Society of Vermont Officers: Fifth Annual Meeting". The Burlington Free Press. Burlington, Vermont. 24 October 1868 – via Newspapers.com.
- "Republican State Convention". Black River Gazette. Ludlow, Vermont. 18 June 1869 – via Newspapers.com.
- "Vermont Election". Vermont Standard. Woodstock, Vermont. 16 September 1869 – via Newspapers.com.
- "Organization of the Legislature". Fair Haven Journal. Fair Haven, Vermont. 23 October 1869 – via Newspapers.com.
- Vermont Council of Censors (25 October 1869). "Address of the Council of Censors". The Burlington Free Press. Burlington, Vermont – via Newspapers.com.
- "Mrs. J. G. Smith Death". The Burlington Free Press. Burlington, Vermont. 7 January 1905 – via Newspapers.com.

Party political offices
Preceded by John B. Page	Republican nominee for Governor of Vermont; 1869	Succeeded by John Wolcott Stewart
Military offices
Preceded by Horace Henry Baxter	Vermont Adjutant General; 1861–1866	Succeeded by William W. Wells
Political offices
Preceded by John B. Page	Governor of Vermont; 1869–1870	Succeeded by George W. Hendee
