= John Ripley Myers =

American businessman

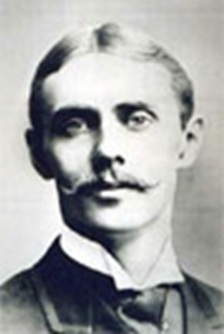
John Ripley Myers, a founder of Bristol-Myers Squibb.

John Ripley Myers (October 8, 1864 – December 22, 1899) was a co-founder (along with William McLaren Bristol) of the pharmaceutical company Bristol-Myers.

== Life ==
John Ripley Myers was born in Cleveland, Ohio, on October 8, 1864. His father was John J. Myers (1831–1883), the first president of the Vermont Marble Company, and his mother was Helen Ripley. The extended Ripley family were active in several Rutland-area businesses and banks, and were wealthy as a result.

Helen Ripley (1836–1865) was the half-sister of poet Julia Caroline Dorr and sister of American Civil War officers William Y. W. Ripley and Edward H. Ripley.

John Ripley Myers graduated from The Morgan School in Clinton, Connecticut, and then attended Hamilton College. He graduated in 1887, and was a member of Sigma Phi. Myers pursued several business ventures, and then partnered with William McLaren Bristol to purchase the Clinton Pharmaceutical Company in Clinton, New York. Myers and Bristol decided to rename the company Bristol, Myers and Company in 1898.

Myers lived in Brooklyn, New York, while working to make Bristol, Myers profitable. While living in Brooklyn, he was also noted for his philanthropic activities, including contributions to charities sponsored by the New York Herald and New York Tribune, as well as donations to Hamilton College.

Bristol, Myers and Company was not instantly profitable, and was still struggling when Myers died of pneumonia in New York City on December 22, 1899.

Myers never married, and had no children.

== Corporate success ==
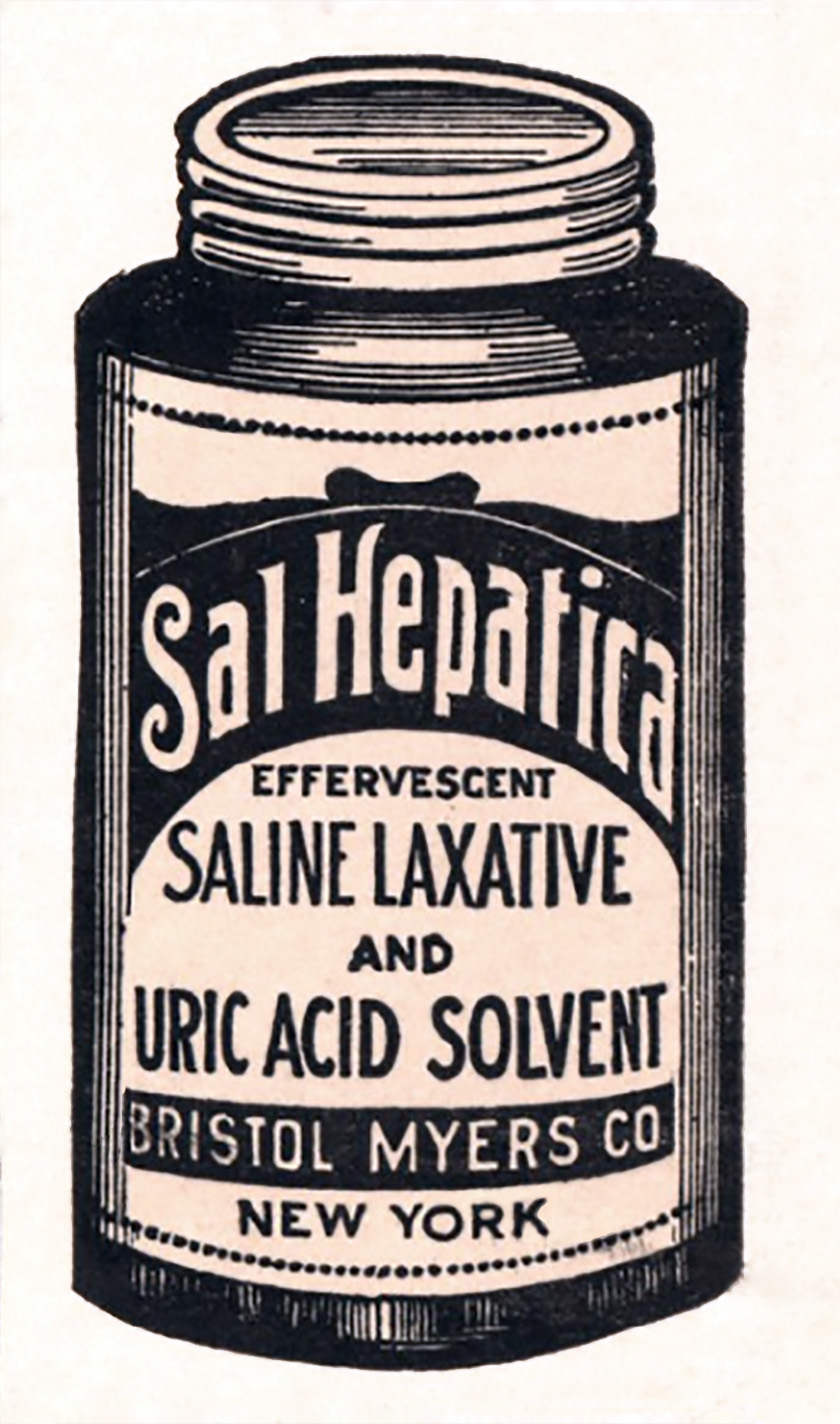
Sal Hepatica (1909)

Although Myers did not live to see Bristol, Myers and Company become successful, his heirs inherited his shares, and his name remained associated with it. In 1900 the company was renamed Bristol-Myers. Its breakthrough was a product called Sal Hepatica, a laxative mineral salt which proved popular because it reproduced the taste and effects of the natural mineral springs of the famous spas in Bohemia.

The next success for Bristol-Myers was Ipana, a toothpaste with a disinfectant ingredient that was marketed as an effective treatment for bleeding gums.

In 1929, the heirs of John Ripley Myers put their shares up for sale, and Bristol-Myers timed an initial public offering to coincide with the Myers family sale, turning Bristol-Myers into an international corporation owned by stockholders and adding to the wealth of the Myers heirs.

Bristol-Myers enjoyed sustained international success and eventually merged with a main competitor, Squibb Pharmaceuticals, to produce the company now known as Bristol-Myers Squibb. Bristol-Myers Squibb is one of the largest pharmaceutical companies in the world.

== Legacy ==
Myers' stepmother, Mary Ware Hewitt Myers (1848–1942), created the John Ripley Myers Lecture Fund at Hamilton College. The Myers lectures are designed to create discussions on topics that are outside the scope of the standard university curriculum.
