= William Ripley =

William Ripley may refer to:

- William Z. Ripley (1867–1941), American economist
- William Y. W. Ripley (1832–1905), Union Army officer and Medal of Honor recipient
