= Albert B. Jewett =

American businessman and military officer from Vermont

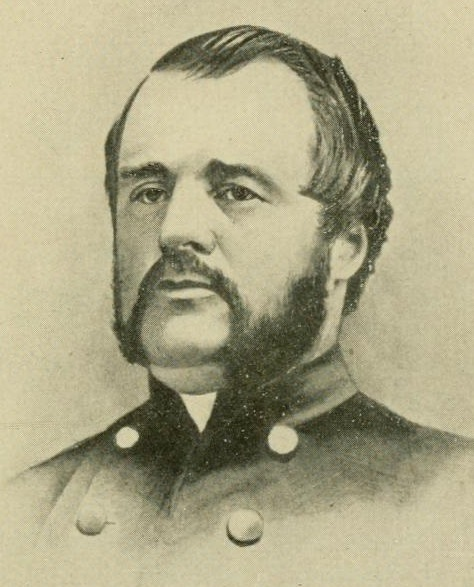
- From 1894's A History of the Tenth Regiment, Vt. Vols.
- Born: March 20, 1829; St. Albans Town, Vermont, US
- Died: March 6, 1887 (aged 57); Jacksonville, Florida, US
- Burial place: Church Street Cemetery, Swanton Village, Vermont, US
- Spouse: Achsa M. Griffin (m. 1851–1887)
- Children: 2
- Relatives: Erastus W. Jewett (brother)
- Military career
- Allegiance: United States (Union); Vermont
- Service: Union Army; Vermont Militia
- Service years: 1861–1864; 1876–1878
- Rank: Colonel
- Units: 1st Vermont Infantry Regiment; Staff of Governor Horace Fairbanks
- Commands: 10th Vermont Infantry Regiment; Independent Brigade, Defenses of Washington
- Wars: American Civil War
- Other work: Businessman

Albert B. Jewett (March 20, 1829 – March 6, 1887) was an American businessman and military officer from Vermont. A Union Army veteran of the American Civil War, Jewett commanded the 10th Vermont Infantry Regiment from 1862 to 1864.

A native of St. Albans Town, Vermont, Jewett was educated in the local schools and operated a store in the village of Swanton. At the outbreak of the Civil War, he joined a militia company that was inducted into federal service as Company A, 1st Vermont Infantry Regiment. He was elected the company's first lieutenant, and served with the 1st Vermont during its entire three months of duty, including participation in the June 1861 Battle of Big Bethel.

After returning to Vermont at the end of his enlistment, Jewett assisted in recruiting the 10th Vermont Infantry Regiment; Colonel William Y. W. Ripley was nominated to serve as commander, but relinquished the position because he was still recovering from wounds received earlier in the war. Jewett was then appointed as the regimental commander, and he served until resigning in April 1864; he led the unit during several campaigns and engagements, including the June 1863 Battle of Brandy Station.

After resigning his commission, Jewett returned to Vermont and resumed operation of his store in Swanton. In 1871, he purchased an interest in the St. Johnsbury and Lake Champlain Railroad and became superintendent of its day-to-day operations. Jewett was also involved in other businesses, including sawmills, as well as steamboats, wharves, and a train station on Lake Champlain. From 1876 to 1878, he served on the military staff of Governor Horace Fairbanks with the rank of colonel. Jewett's health began to decline in 1885, and he died on March 6, 1887, while spending the winter in Jacksonville, Florida. Jewett was buried at Church Street Cemetery in Swanton.

== Early life ==
Albert Burton Jewett was born in the town of St. Albans, Vermont, on March 20, 1829, a son of Eleazer and Dorothy (Abell) Jewett. Among his siblings were Erastus W. Jewett, a Civil War recipient of the Medal of Honor, and Jesse A. Jewett, a captain in the 5th Vermont Infantry Regiment who died of illness shortly after the end of the war.

Albert Jewett was raised and educated in St. Albans, and in 1850 became the owner and operator of a general store in Swanton. He managed the store with different partners at different times throughout the 1850s, including his brother Jason and Colonel Elisha Leonard Barney, who was killed in 1864 while commanding the 6th Vermont Infantry Regiment. In 1851, Jewett married Achsa M. Griffin (1833–1912). They were the parents of two children, Frances Emily (1852–1871), the wife of J. Azro Gould, and George Abell (1860–1880). At the start of the American Civil War, Jewett belonged to a company of the Vermont Militia, Company C, 4th Regiment also known as the Green Mountain Guards.

== Military service ==
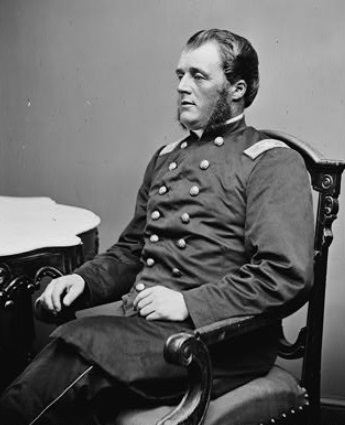
Jewett as colonel and commander of the 10th Vermont, circa 1863

Jewett was serving as first lieutenant of the Green Mountain Guards when the company was inducted into federal service as Company A, 1st Vermont Infantry Regiment. The 1st Vermont carried out three months of active duty, primarily in Virginia, and Jewett continued to serve as Company A's first lieutenant. He was with his company when it took part in the Battle of Big Bethel near Newport News on June 10, 1861.

After the 1st Vermont's term of service ended, Jewett returned to Vermont, where he assisted in recruiting a new regiment, the 10th Vermont Infantry, of which he became second in command as a lieutenant colonel. The regiment was originally commanded by William Y. W. Ripley, who relinquished the position because he was recovering from wounds he received earlier in the war, which left him unable to lead troops in combat. Jewett succeeded Ripley as commander in August 1862 and was promoted to colonel.

During Jewett's command, the 10th Vermont took part in the Civil War Defenses of Washington, with companies and detachments manning outposts around the outskirts of the city. For nearly a year, Jewett commanded a brigade at Offutt's Crossroads, Maryland, which included the 10th Vermont, 39th Massachusetts, 14th New Hampshire, and 23rd Maine. In late 1863, Jewett commanded the 10th Vermont during the Battle of Mine Run, where his personal gallantry and coolness under fire earned him commendations from his brigade and division commanders. An extended illness led to Jewett resigning his commission in April 1864, and he was succeeded by William W. Henry; before he departed for home, a meeting of the 10th Vermont's officers passed a resolution praising his service as their commander, which they communicated to several Vermont newspapers.

== Business career ==
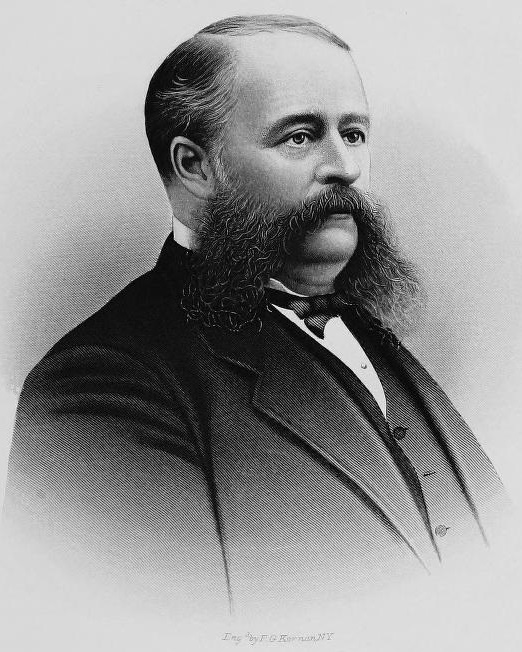
Jewett during his post-war business career

After the war, Jewett was one of the founders of the Reunion Society of Vermont Officers. He was also a member of the Grand Army of the Republic, and was active for many years in the Swanton and St. Johnsbury posts. Jewett was an active Freemason, and from 1875 to 1876 he was Grand Commander of Vermont's Knights Templar. He was active in politics as a Republican, attended local conventions as a delegate, and served in Swanton town offices including highway surveyor and select board member.

Following his military service, Jewett resumed management of his Swanton store and invested in ventures including a Swanton Falls peat bed. In the early 1870s, he became active in railroad management when he helped organize the St. Johnsbury and Lake Champlain Railroad. He became the superintendent of the railway's operations, and eventually became its vice president. He resided in St. Johnsbury, but continued to maintain his home of record in Swanton. In addition to managing the railroad, Jewett held an ownership stake in an Essex County lumber business and invested in St. Johnsbury real estate. His enterprises in the Swanton area included a quicklime factory, which he owned in partnership with his brother Erastus and others.

In connection with the St. Johnsbury and Lake Champlain Railroad, Jewett was also a partner in a venture that constructed and operated a steamboat on Lake Champlain, which made trips between the Maquam Bay near Swanton, Plattsburgh, New York, and several Lake Champlain islands. This enterprise also expanded to other amenities that facilitated the movement of freight and passengers, including a train station, wharves, and a hotel on the bay. From 1876 to 1878, Jewett served on the military staff of Governor Horace Fairbanks with the rank of colonel.

In 1885, Jewett's health began to decline, and he lost movement in his left leg. During the winter of 1886–1887, he traveled to Florida in hope that a milder climate would facilitate his recovery. He died in Jacksonville, Florida, on March 6, 1887. Jewett's funeral took place in Swanton, and he was buried at Swanton's Church Street Cemetery.
