= Marcus T. Hun =

American lawyer (1845–1920)

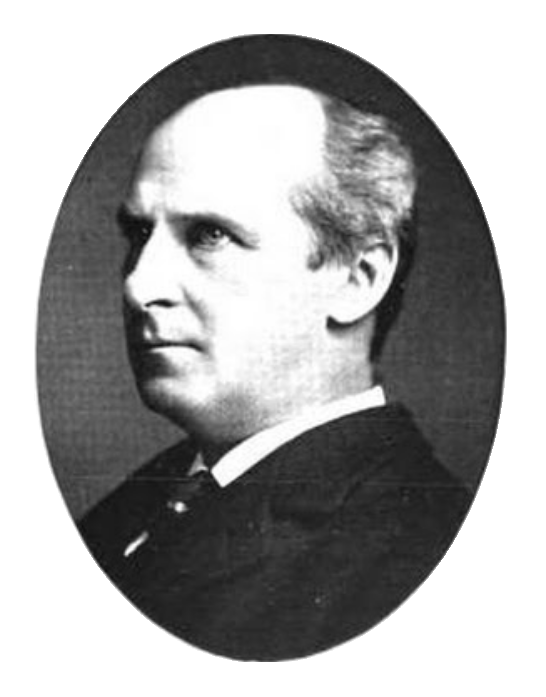
Marcus T. Hun

Marcus Tullius Hun (May 22, 1845 – February 28, 1920) was a New York lawyer who served as the state's Supreme Court Reporter for 32 years, from his appointment in 1874 up to his retirement, in the fall of 1905.

== Early life and education ==
Born in Albany, New York to Dr. Thomas Hun, he studied at private schools in Massachusetts and at the Albany Boys Academy before entering Union College, from which he graduated in 1865. He attended Albany Law School, and upon graduation was admitted to the bar and commenced the practice of law at Albany as a partner of Orlando Meads.

== Legal career ==
In 1874 Hun was appointed Supreme Court Reporter, which position he held for 32 years, until the fall of 1905. In 1894, the Appellate Division of Supreme Court was established pursuant to a revised state constitution, and Hun thereafter served as publisher of the Appellate Division Reports. Hun has been described as "the most prolific reporter of the nominative reports". Upon his retirement, a resolution was published in 108 App Div xlv stating:

The unvarying accuracy of his reports, and their complete fulfilment of the requirements of an ideal standard of excellence, afford abundant evidence of the sedulous and painstaking care which he has bestowed upon their preparation, as well as of the unusual skill and judgment which he has brought to the discharge of a difficult and onerous duty. His long-continued efforts for the improvement of the reporting system of this State constitute a distinguished public service which merits and has received the universal approval both of the bench and the bar.

While serving in this capacity, he entered into partnership with his brother, Leonard G. Hun, under the firm name of M. T. & L. G. Hun. After the death of his brother he was associated with Russell Johnston and Learned Hand until 1902, when Hand moved to New York City. Hun then formed a new firm with his son-in-law, Lewis R. Parker, under the name Hun & Parker. On June 13, 1905, the board of trustees of Union College conferred upon him the honorary degree of LL. D.

Hun also served at various times as a director of the Albany Trust Company, and of the New York State National Bank, from which he resigned to be elected president of the Albany Savings Bank on November 16, 1909. Hun was also trustee of the Albany Law School, a member of the chapter of All Saints' Cathedral and a charter member of the Fort Orange Club.

== Personal life ==
On December 21, 1875, he married Mary Keith Van Der Poel, with whom he had four children. Van Der Poel was a daughter of the late Isaac Van Der Poel, at one time Adjutant-General of the State.

Hun died February 28, 1920. His cause of death was listed as Acute Pulmonary Oedema. He was buried in the Albany Rural Cemetery, for which he was serving as President of the Albany Cemetery Association.
