= George E. Davis (Medal of Honor) =

George Evans Davis
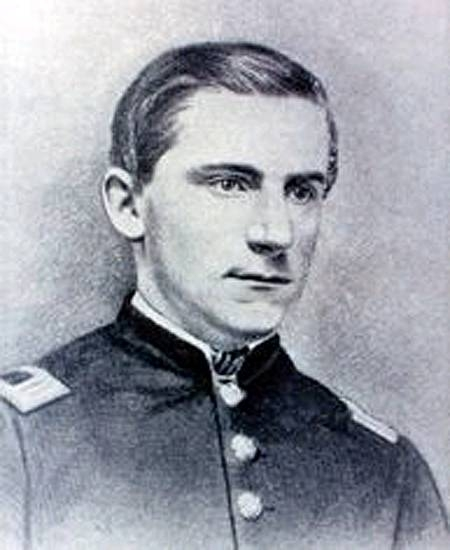
- Capt. George E. Davis
- Born: December 26, 1839; Dunstable, Massachusetts
- Died: June 28, 1926 (aged 86); Bennington, Vermont
- Burial place: Lakeview Cemetery, Burlington, Vermont
- Military career
- Allegiance: United States; Union
- Branch: Union Army
- Service years: 1861, 1862 - 1865
- Rank: Captain
- Unit: 10th Vermont Volunteer Infantry
- Conflicts: American Civil War: Battle of Monocacy
- Awards: Medal of Honor

George Evans Davis (December 26, 1839 – June 28, 1926) was a recipient of the Medal of Honor during the American Civil War.

== Early life ==
Davis was born in Dunstable, Massachusetts, and worked as a clerk in a local store.

== Civil War ==
At the start of the war in April 1861, Davis enlisted in the 1st Vermont Infantry for three months service. After his three-month enlistment expired, he returned to his civilian job.

Following President Lincoln's call for more volunteers in July 1862, Davis re-enlisted as a private in Company D, 10th Vermont Infantry. He was quickly elected to the rank of second lieutenant and promoted to first lieutenant in January 1863.

On July 9, 1864, at the Battle of Monocacy, Davis was in command of a small detachment ordered to guard bridges. Despite repeated attacks by the Confederates, Davis's detachment held.

Davis continued to serve with the 10th Vermont Infantry and was promoted to captain during the Shenandoah Valley Campaign. While in winter quarters in Petersburg, Virginia, his cabin accidentally collapsed. Davis suffered an injury to his leg and was discharged due to disability.

== Postbellum life ==
After the war, Davis became a companion of the Vermont Commandery of the Military Order of the Loyal Legion of the United States.

On May 27, 1892, Davis received the Medal of Honor for his command of the bridge defense at Monocacy. He died at the Vermont Soldiers' Home in Bennington, Vermont, and is buried in Lakeview Cemetery in Burlington, Vermont.

== Medal of Honor citation ==

Rank and organization: First Lieutenant, Company D, 10th Vermont Infantry. Place and date: At Monocacy, Md., 9 July 1864. Entered service at: Burlington, Vt. Birth: Dunstable, Mass. Date of issue: 27 May 1892.

Citation:

While in command of a small force, held the approaches to the 2 bridges against repeated assaults of superior numbers, thereby materially delaying Early's advance on Washington.

== See also ==
- List of Medal of Honor recipients
- List of American Civil War Medal of Honor recipients: A–F
