= Josiah O. Livingston =

American Civil War Union Army officer

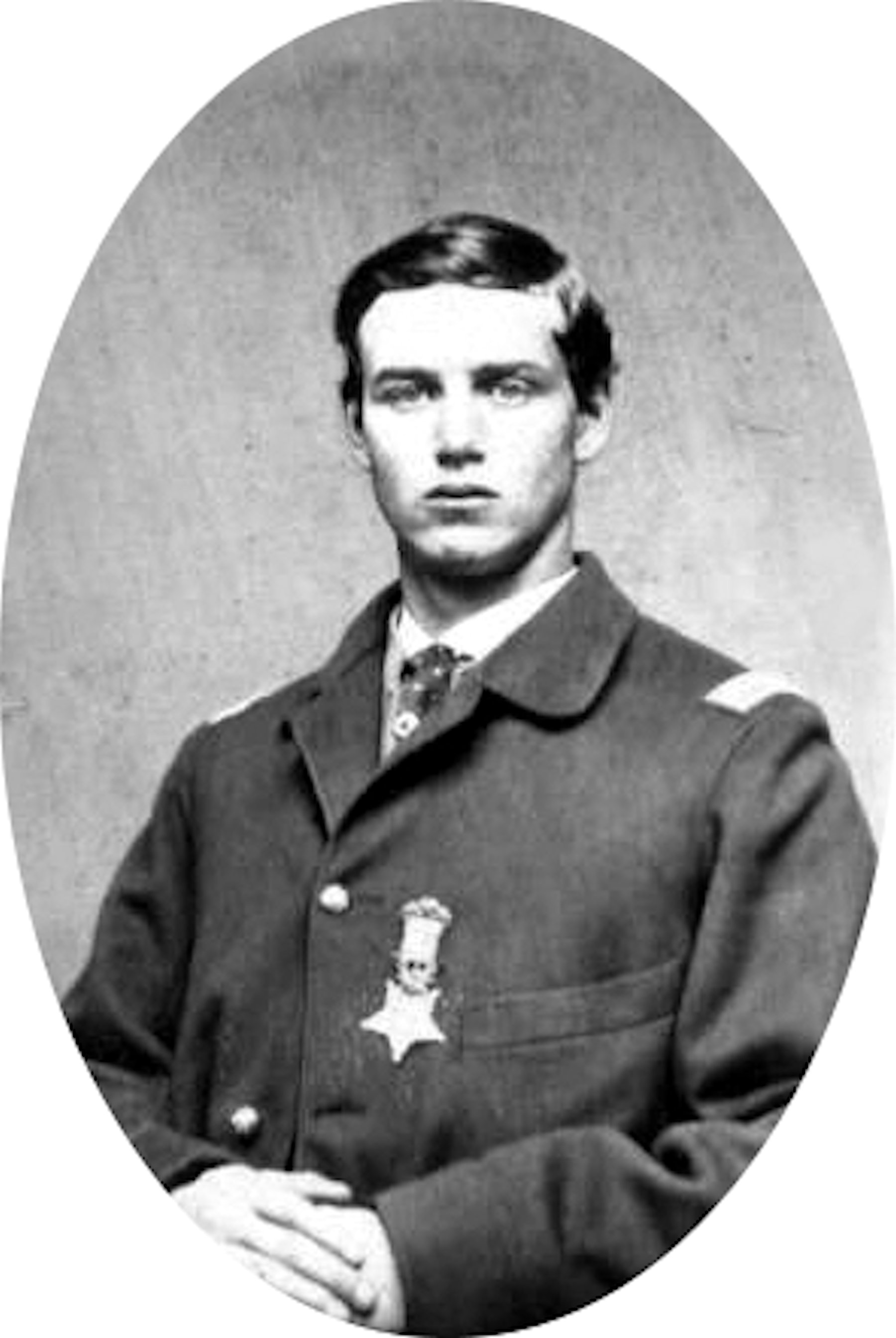
- Born: February 3, 1837; Walden, Vermont
- Died: July 23, 1917 (aged 80)
- Burial place: Robinson Cemetery, Calais, Vermont
- Military career
- Allegiance: United States of America; Union
- Branch: United States Army; Union Army
- Service years: 1862 – 1865
- Rank: Captain
- Unit: 9th Vermont Volunteer Infantry Regiment
- Conflicts: American Civil War
- Awards: Medal of Honor

Josiah O. Livingston (February 3, 1837 – July 23, 1917) was an officer in the Union Army and a Medal of Honor recipient for his actions in the American Civil War.

Livingston joined the 9th Vermont Infantry as a first lieutenant in June 1862 and became regimental adjutant a year later. He was promoted to captain in November 1864.

After the war, he was elected as a veteran companion of the Military Order of the Loyal Legion of the United States.

== Medal of Honor citation ==
Rank and organization: First Lieutenant, and Adjutant, 9th Vermont Infantry. Place and date: At Newport Barracks, N.C., February 2, 1864. Entered service at: Marshfield, Vt. Birth: Walden, Vt. Date of issue: September 8, 1891.

Citation:

When, after desperate resistance, the small garrison had been driven back to the river by a vastly superior force, this officer, while a small force held back the enemy, personally fired the railroad bridge, and, although wounded himself, assisted a wounded officer over the burning structure.

== See also ==
- List of Medal of Honor recipients
- List of American Civil War Medal of Honor recipients: G–L
