= St. Albans (town), Vermont =

Saint Albans, Vermont
- Town
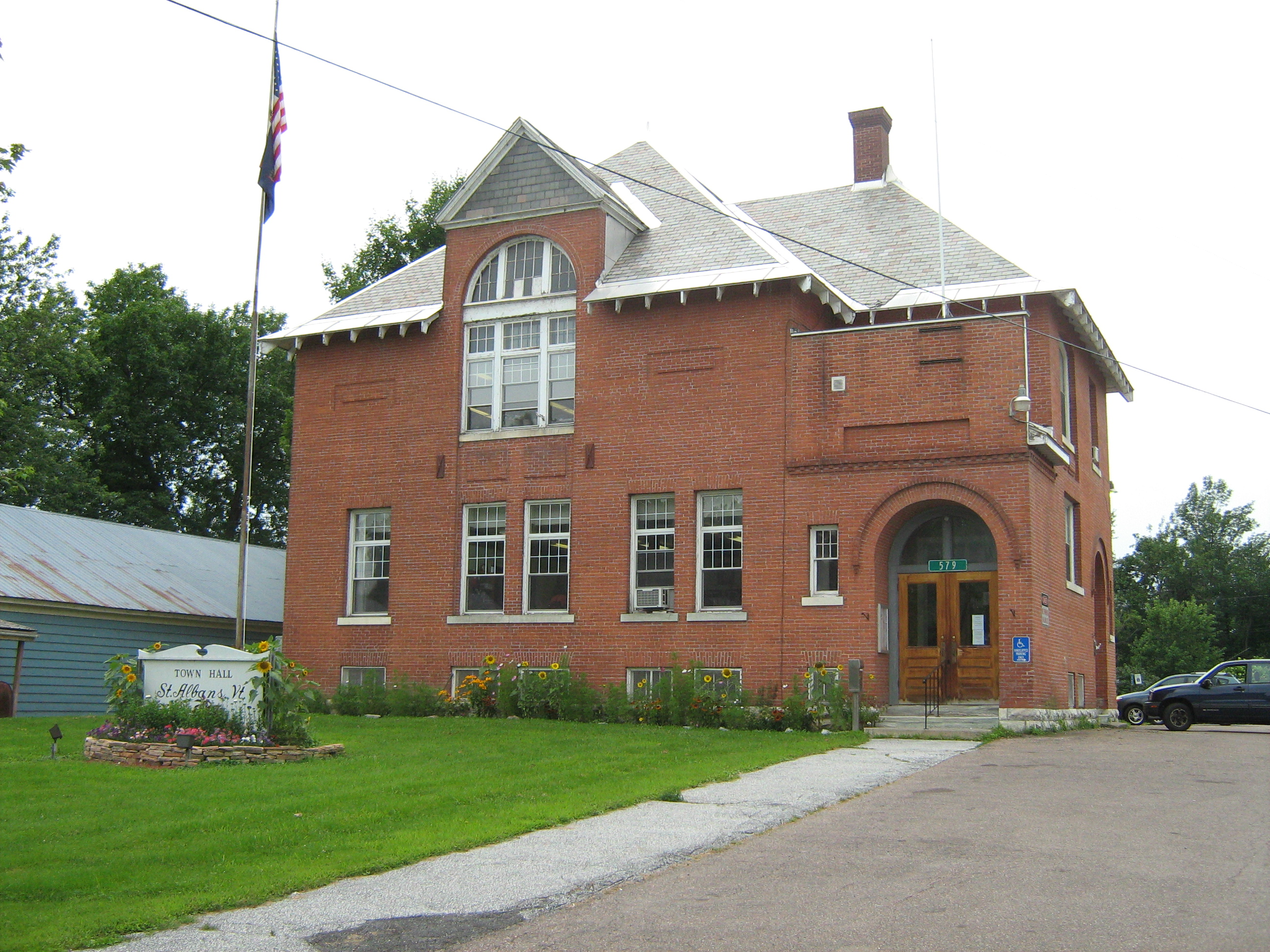
- Saint Albans Town Hall

- Seal

- Location in Franklin County and the state of Vermont
- Coordinates: 44°48′43″N 73°05′06″W
- Country: United States
- State: Vermont
- County: Franklin
- Community: St. Albans Bay

Government
  - Type: Selectboard

Area
  - Total: 60.5 sq mi (156.8 km^{2})
  - Land: 37.0 sq mi (95.9 km^{2})
  - Water: 23.5 sq mi (60.9 km^{2})
- Elevation: 98 ft (30 m)

Population (2020)
  - Total: 6,988
  - Density: 189/sq mi (72.9/km^{2})
- Time zone: UTC-5 (Eastern (EST))
  - Summer (DST): UTC-4 (EDT)
- ZIP Codes: 05478 (St. Albans); 05481 (St. Albans Bay); 05488 (Swanton)
- Area code: 802
- FIPS Code: 50-011-61750
- GNIS feature ID: 1462197
- Website: www.stalbanstown.com

Saint Albans, commonly abbreviated as St. Albans, is a town in Franklin County, Vermont, United States. As of the 2020 census, the population was 6,988. The town completely surrounds Saint Albans City, which is a separate municipality.

== History ==
The town was named for St. Albans in England. That city was named for the Early Christian English saint and protomartyr.

On October 19, 1864, St. Albans was the site of the St. Albans Raid, the northernmost Confederate land action of the American Civil War. The Confederates conducted a cavalry raid and bank robbery from across the border with Quebec, Canada. The town of St. Albans and the city of St. Albans were not separated until 1902. References to "St. Albans" prior to this date generally refer to the town center, which now belongs to the city. The town was incorporated in 1859, and the city in 1902.

At times after the civil war, Irish men seeking independence for Ireland, made what are known as the Fenian raids on Canada. At least two took place in 1866, and others in 1870–1871. Men were recruited from New York City to St. Albans, Vermont. Henri Le Caron was serving as a secret agent of the British government during this time, but also held the position of "Inspector-General of the Irish Republican Army". He asserted that he distributed fifteen thousand stands of arms and almost three million rounds of ammunition to the men preparing for the raids, which took place in April 1870. Forewarned, United States General George Meade, captured much of these munitions as they arrived. Many of the raiders never made it across the Canadian border. They seemed most successful in causing support to increase for the Canadian Confederation, as Canadians believed they needed to be unified in defense.

By the 1890s, the town of St. Albans had become the big stick of butter capital of the world; it had 1,000 farms and 15,000 cows.

Pilot Amelia Earhart was said to have flown here May 22, 1934. This may have been related to promotion for her line of clothing for active wear, which she began that year.

== Geography ==
The town is located in western Franklin County and extends west into Lake Champlain to the border with Grand Isle County, Vermont. According to the United States Census Bureau, the town has a total area of 60.5 square miles (156.8 km^{2}), of which 37.0 square miles (95.9 km^{2}) is land and 23.5 square miles (60.9 km^{2}), or 38.84%, is water. The southwest part of the town fronts on St. Albans Bay, an arm of Lake Champlain. Woods Island, Burton Island, and Ball Island within the lake are all part of the town.

== Demographics ==
Historical population
Census	Pop.	Note	%±
1790	256		—
1800	901		252.0%
1810	1,609		78.6%
1820	1,636		1.7%
1830	2,395		46.4%
1840	2,702		12.8%
1850	3,567		32.0%
1860	3,637		2.0%
1870	7,014		92.9%
1880	7,193		2.6%
1890	7,771		8.0%
1900	1,715		−77.9%
1910	1,617		−5.7%
1920	1,583		−2.1%
1930	1,691		6.8%
1940	1,733		2.5%
1950	1,908		10.1%
1960	2,303		20.7%
1970	3,270		42.0%
1980	3,555		8.7%
1990	4,606		29.6%
2000	5,086		10.4%
2010	5,999		18.0%
2020	6,988		16.5%
U.S. Decennial Census

At the 2020 census, the racial makeup was 96.6% White, 0.2% Black, 0.1% Native American, 2.0% Asian and 0.1 Latino of any race.

At the 2000 census, there were 5,086 people, 1,836 households and 1,404 families residing in the town. The population density was 135.4 people per square mile (52.3 people/km^{2}). There were 2,257 housing units at an average density of 60.1 units per square mile (23.2 units/km^{2}). The racial makeup of the town was 96.95% White, 0.39% Black or African American, 0.75% Native American, 0.33% Asian, 0.16% from other races, and 1.42% from two or more races. Hispanic or Latino of any race were 0.67% of the population.

There were 1,836 households, of which 38.2% had children under the age of 18 living with them, 61.6% were married couples living together, 11.1% had a female householder with no husband present, and 23.5% were non-families. 18.0% of all households were made up of individuals, and 7.5% had someone living alone who was 65 years of age or older. The average household size was 2.68 and the average family size was 3.01.

Age distribution was 27.0% under the age of 18, 5.7% from 18 to 24, 29.9% from 25 to 44, 23.3% from 45 to 64, and 14.1% who were 65 years of age or older. The median age was 38 years. For every 100 females, there were 95.8 males. For every 100 females age 18 and over, there were 90.7 males.

The median household income was $46,875, and the median family income was $53,147. Males had a median income of $34,698 versus $26,000 for females. The per capita income for the town was $18,604. About 7.4% of families and 5.8% of the population were below the poverty line, including 8.1% of those under age 18 and 4.7% of those age 65 or over.

== Arts and culture ==
=== Annual cultural events ===
St. Albans town is located on the shore of Lake Champlain. Every Fourth of July is marked by the "Bay Day" event, which includes a triathlon and a fireworks show on the bay.

=== Major routes ===
The town is served by the following numbered highways.

- Interstate 89, with access from Exits 19 and 20
- U.S. Route 7
- Vermont Route 36
- Vermont Route 38
- Vermont Route 104
- Vermont Route 105
- Vermont Route 207

== Education ==
It is in the Maple Run Unified School District.

== Notable people ==
- Bradley Barlow, US congressman, industrialist
- William Beaumont, surgeon in the U.S. Army
- Corydon Beckwith, Illinois Supreme Court justice
- Paul Blackburn, poet
- Lawrence Brainerd, US senator
- Richard M. Brewer, assumed leader of Billy the Kid's band
- Michael J. Colburn, director of the United States Marine Band
- Abbott Lowell Cummings, architectural historian and genealogist
- Sile Doty, infamous thief, counterfeiter, and criminal gang leader
- Albert S. Drew, mayor of Burlington, Vermont
- Albert B. Jewett, commander of the 10th Vermont Infantry Regiment during the American Civil War
- John LeClair, professional ice hockey player, left wing for three teams
- Rod Loomis, actor
- William L. Manly, pioneer author, wrote "Death Valley in '49"
- Sara Weeks Roberts, president, National Library for the Blind (United States)
- John Gregory Smith, 28th governor of Vermont
- William Farrar Smith, Union general during the American Civil War
- Orlando Stevens, member of the state legislatures of Vermont and Minnesota
- Benjamin Swift, US senator

== Champ ==
The lake monster "Champ" was allegedly sighted and photographed near St. Albans. The creature in Lake Champlain was ostensibly given in 1609 by French explorer Samuel de Champlain, the founder of Quebec City and the lake's namesake, who is supposed to have been the first white man to record spotting "Champ" as he was fighting the Iroquois on the bank of the lake. However, in actuality no such sighting was recorded, and it has since been traced back to a 1970 article.
