= Sara Weeks Roberts =

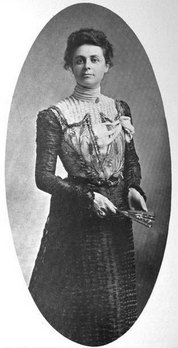
- Born: January 29, 1865; St. Albans, Vermont
- Died: May 6, 1932 (aged 67); New York City
- Education: Emerson College of Oratory
- Occupations: Social Activist, Suffragist
- Spouse: Ernest W. Roberts (m. 1898)

Sara Weeks Roberts (January 29, 1865 St. Albans, Vermont – May 6, 1932 in Queens, New York City, New York) was an American social reformer and activist. She succeeded Thomas Nelson Page as president of the National Library for the Blind.

== Early years and education ==
Sara Weeks was born in St. Albans, Vermont, January 29, 1865. She was the daughter of Hiram Bellows and Sarah M. (Burgess) Weeks. She was educated in the public schools of that city before attending Emerson College of Oratory, Boston, where she was a student in the regular and post-graduate courses.

== Career ==
She married Ernest W. Roberts, a lawyer and a member of Congress, from Chelsea, Massachusetts, on February 2, 1898. Their children were Ernest Weeks (born 1898); Sara Dean (born 1899); John Page (born 1901); and Hiram Weeks (born 1907).

Roberts was the president of the National Library for the Blind; vice-president, Board of Lady Managers, National Homeopathic Hospital, Washington, D.C.; hon. vice president, Consumers' League. Washington, D.C.; member Massachusetts Suffrage Association; and president, Chelsea Woman's, Congressional, of Washington, D.C. She was a member of the Universalist church; and had homes in Chelsea, Washington, D.C., and Rockport, Massachusetts.
