= 9th Vermont Infantry Regiment =

- Active: July 9, 1862, to April 1865
- Country: United States
- Allegiance: Union
- Branch: Infantry

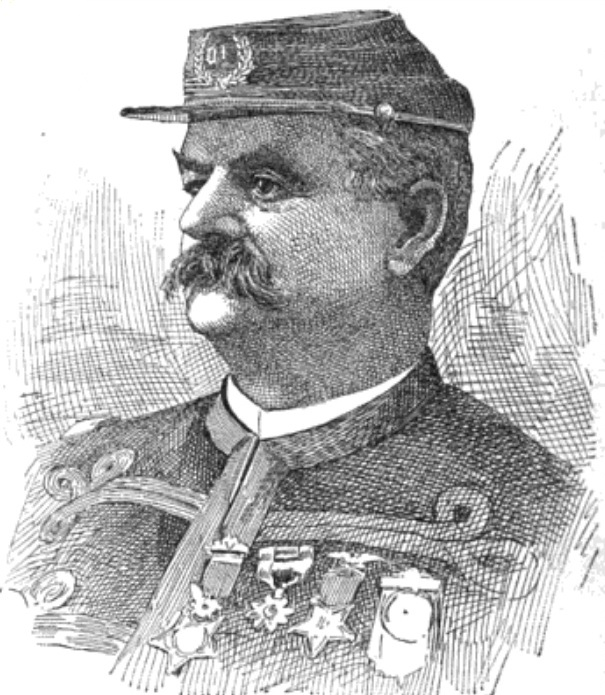
Erastus W. Jewett, Civil War Medal of Honor recipient with the 9th Vermont.

The 9th Vermont Infantry Regiment was a three years' infantry regiment in the Union Army during the American Civil War. It served in the Eastern Theater, from July 1862 to December 1865. It served in the VII, XVII and XXIV Corps.

== History ==
The 9th Vermont Infantry was captured at the Battle of Harpers Ferry during the 1862 Maryland Campaign. The regiment later fought well with the VII, XVIII and XXIV Corps in eastern Virginia and North Carolina. The 9th Vermont Infantry was one of the first units to enter Richmond, Virginia, in April 1865.

The regiment was mustered into Federal service on July 9, 1862, at Brattleboro, Vermont.

It was engaged in, or present at, Harper's Ferry, Newport Barracks, Chaffin's Farm, Fair Oaks and the Fall of Richmond.

The regiment lost during its term of service: 23 men killed and mortally wounded, 5 died from accident, 2 committed suicide, 36 died in Confederate prisons and 232 died from disease; for a total loss of 298 men.

The regiment mustered out of service on December 1, 1865.

== Commanders ==
- George J. Stannard
- Dudley Kimball Andross
- Edward H. Ripley
- Valentine G. Barney (Acting)

== Notable members ==
- Erastus W. Jewett, Medal of Honor.
- Abel E. Leavenworth, Capt. Co. K; Assistant Adjutant General, District of Appomattox.
- Josiah O. Livingston, Medal of Honor.
- Theodore S. Peck, Medal of Honor recipient, Adjutant General of the Vermont National Guard.
