= Alexander Scott (Medal of Honor) =

Alexander Scott (Jr)
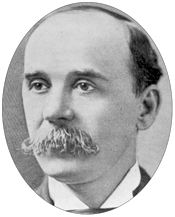
- Born: August 19, 1844; Montreal, Canada East
- Died: May 27, 1923 (aged 78); Washington, D.C., U.S.
- Burial place: Arlington National Cemetery
- Military career
- Allegiance: United States of America; Union
- Branch: United States Army; Union Army
- Service years: 1862 – 1865
- Rank: Corporal
- Units: Co. D, 10th Vermont Infantry Regiment
- Conflicts: American Civil War; Battle of Monocacy; Battle of Cedar Creek
- Awards: Medal of Honor
- Other work: Chief, Draughsman's Division, U.S. Patent Office

Alexander Scott (August 19, 1844 – May 27, 1923) was a soldier in the Union Army during the American Civil War and a recipient of the Medal of Honor for his actions in the Battle of Monocacy, Maryland.

== Biography ==
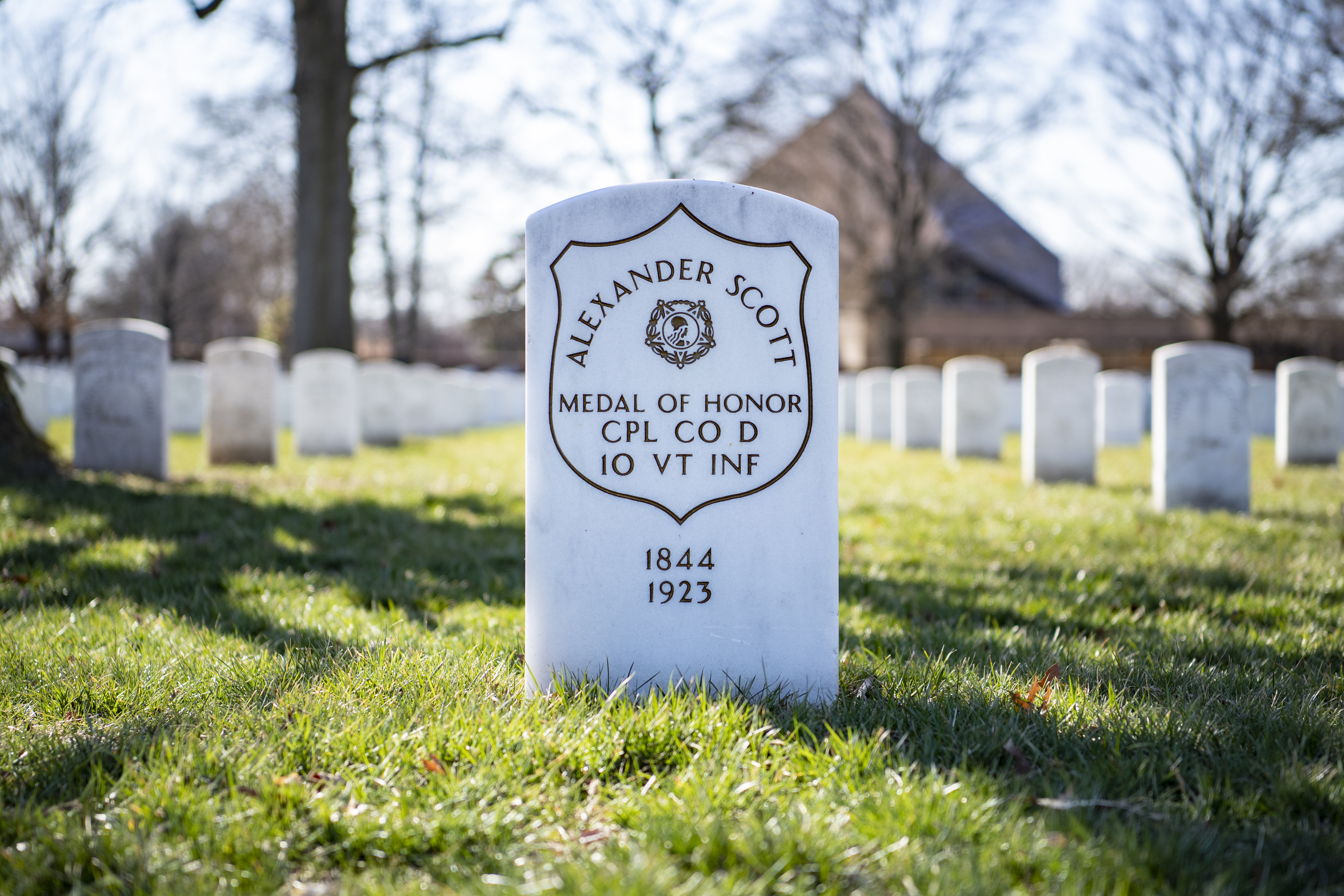
Grave at Arlington National Cemetery

Alexander Scott was the only son (he had two sisters Margaret and Flora) of Alexander and Mary Ann (Day) Scott. He was born in Montreal in 1844, but his parents moved to Burlington, Vermont, when he was six years old. His father enlisted in Co. I, Fifth Regiment Vermont Volunteers and died from wounds at Annapolis, MD on Oct 19, 1862.

Scott entered service with 10th Vermont Infantry Regiment as a private at Winooski, Vermont, on August 2, 1862. He was promoted to corporal and was assigned to the color guard.

On October 19, 1864, Scott was severely wounded in the right thigh by a musket ball at Cedar Creek, Virginia. After recovering he rejoined his regiment on the march to Danville, Virginia, in April 1865. He returned with his regiment to Burlington, VT and was discharged July 3, 1865. His commanding officer Major Lydon, in recommending him for the Medal of Honor, stated, "during all the above period with the Color Guard, Corporal Scott refused promotion for the honor of remaining in that important and hazardous service".

He first married Hattie Conklin in Flint, Michigan. She died in Washington, D.C., in 1876. He married his second wife Alice V. Skippon on September 4, 1878, in Washington, D.C.

He had two sons, William H. Scott (b. 1869) and Charles A. Scott by his first wife and two children May and Alexander by his second wife. However, in 1916 Alexander Scott wrote "all children dead" on a pension application and in 1923 his widow stated "no children surviving" on her application for a widow's pension.

He died on May 27, 1923, in Washington, D.C., at the age of 78 and was buried at Arlington National Cemetery.

== Medal of Honor citation ==

Rank and Organization:

corporal of Co. D, 10th Vermont Volunteers.

Citation:

at Monacracy July 9, 1864, this soldier, a corporal in Co. D, 10th Vermont Volunteers and carrying the State Flag while his regiment was withdrawing under very heavy fire of the enemy saw the color sergeant bearing the national colors fall out of line exhausted and drop to the rear which meant inevitable capture. Corporal Scott then nearly overpowered by the heat and fatigue picked up the national flag and carried both colors during the remainder of the action.

== See also ==
- List of American Civil War Medal of Honor recipients: M–P
