= Lucien de la Hodde =

Lucien de la Hodde (born 1808 in France) became a writer and a member of various secret revolutionary societies in France during the Restoration of Louis XVIII and during the July Monarchy of Louis Phillipe I. Later he became a police agent. Lucien de la Hodde died in 1865.

== Biography ==
Born in Wimille on November 25, 1812, François-Lucien Delahodde (full name) was an Informant for Police Prefect Gabriel Delessert, who infiltrated the Republican ranks during the July Monarchy. His book Histoire des sociétés secrètes et du parti républicain de 1830 à 1848: Louis-Philippe Et La Révolution de Février, Portraits, Scènes de Conspirations, Faits inconnus will be translated into English by General John W. Phelps.
