= Abel E. Leavenworth =

Abel Edgar Leavenworth
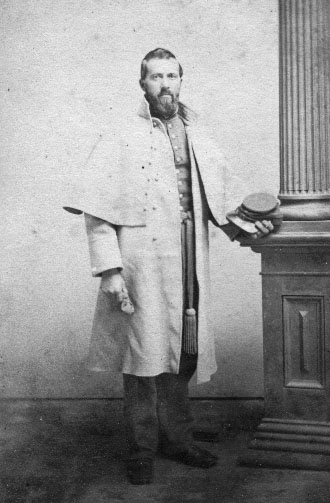
- 1st Lieutenant Abel E. Leavenworth, Company K, 9th Regiment, Vermont Volunteer Infantry.
- Born: September 3, 1828; Charlotte, Vermont
- Died: June 3, 1901 (aged 73); Castleton, Vermont
- Burial place: Hillside Cemetery in Castleton, Vermont
- Military career
- Allegiance: United States of America
- Branch: United States Army: Union Army
- Service years: 1862–65
- Rank: Captain
- Unit: 9th Vermont Volunteer Infantry Regiment
- Conflicts: American Civil War
- Other work: Educator

Abel E. Leavenworth (September 3, 1828 – June 3, 1901) was an American educator and soldier.

== Childhood and early career ==
Abel Edgar Leavenworth was born 3 September 1828 in Charlotte, Vermont, son of Abel and Anna (Hickok) Leavenworth. He obtained his early education at the district schools of Charlotte and Madrid, New York, and continued his studies at Hinesburgh Academy. He entered the University of Vermont, from which he graduated in 1856. He was one of the founders of the Delta Psi fraternity at the university.

He began his career as a teacher in 1846, taught district schools and eventually became the principal of the Bolivar Academy, Bolivar, Missouri, and the academies of Hinesburgh and Brattleboro.

== Civil War service ==
After the outbreak of the American Civil War, Leavenworth resigned his school position to enlist as a private in Company K, Ninth Regiment Vermont Volunteers. He was promoted through the ranks of sergeant and first lieutenant to that of captain. He was made assistant inspector general of Isaac J. Wistar’s brigade of the U. S. forces on York Peninsula, of the Second division of the Eighteenth army corps, and of the provisional brigade at Bermuda Hundred, Virginia. He also served as assistant adjutant general of the last-named command, later of the Second brigade, Third division, Twenty-fourth army corps, and led the skirmish line into the city of Richmond on 3 April 1865. He was appointed assistant provost marshal of that city, and subsequently assistant adjutant general of the district of Appomattox. He was mustered out of the service at Richmond on 13 June 1865, having received highly commendatory letters from the generals on whose staff he had served.

He was a delegate-at-large from Vermont for the Grand Army of the Republic at the twenty-fifth national encampment at Detroit in August 1891.

== Later career ==
When the war ended, he returned to Vermont and again took charge of Hinesburgh Academy, which he left in 1868. In 1870 Leavenworth secured the incorporation and endowment of Beeman Academy at New Haven, the leadership of which he resigned in 1874 to become principal of the State Normal School at Randolph.

He left the Normal School at Randolph in 1879 and spent two years in institute work and the collection of a large cabinet of fossils and minerals. In 1881 he purchased the school building and equipment of the Rutland County grammar school, and was appointed principal of the State Normal School at Castleton (now a campus of Vermont State University). He retired in 1897.

== Personal life ==
On 14 September 1853, Leavenworth married Mary Evelina, daughter of Samuel and Sally (Hubbard) Griggs, of Cazenovia, New York. Their children were: Anna Maria, Francis Abel, Samuel Edgar, Clarence Greenman, William Stowell, Emily Reynolds, and Philip Reynolds. Mary Evelina (Griggs) Leavenworth died 30 July 1877.
