= 1869 Vermont gubernatorial election =

- September 7, 1869
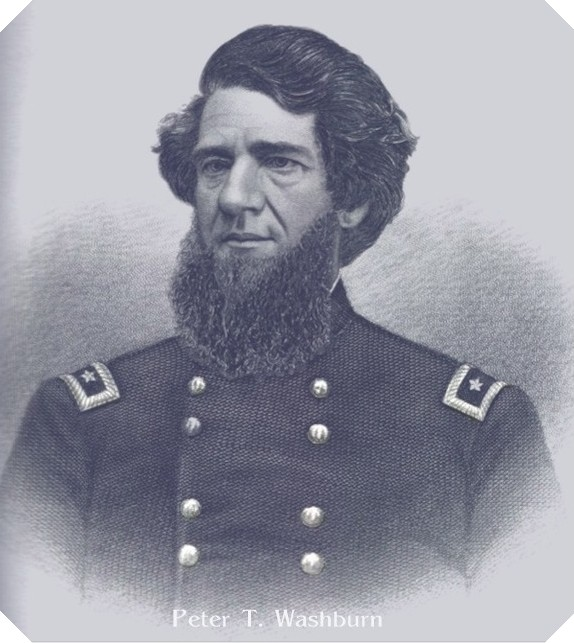

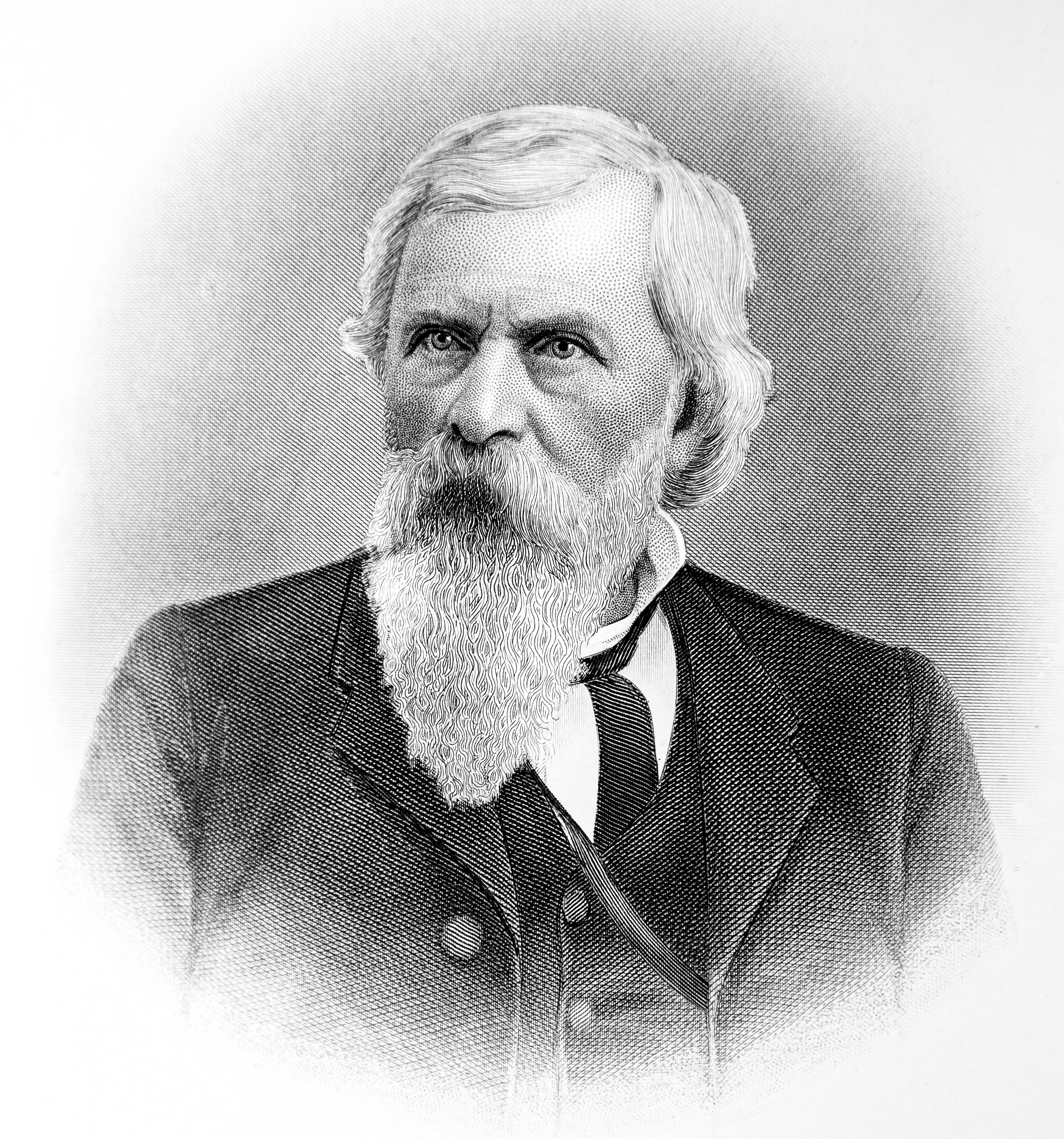
Candidate	Peter T. Washburn	Homer W. Heaton
Party	Republican	Democratic
Popular vote	31,834	11,455
Percentage	73.49%	26.45%
- County results Washburn: 60–70% 70–80% 80–90%
Governor before election
John B. Page
Republican
Elected Governor
Peter T. Washburn
Republican

The 1869 Vermont gubernatorial election took place on September 7, 1869. Incumbent Republican John B. Page, per the "Mountain Rule", did not run for re-election to another term as Governor of Vermont. Republican candidate Peter T. Washburn, who had served in the Vermont House of Representatives and as Adjutant General of the Vermont Militia, defeated Democratic candidate Homer W. Heaton, a former member of the Vermont House, to succeed him. The 1869 election was the final time the Governor of Vermont was elected for a one-year term; terms were changed to two years beginning in 1870.

== Results ==
1869 Vermont gubernatorial election
Party	Candidate	Votes	%	±%
Republican	Peter T. Washburn	31,834	73.49	0.0
Democratic	Homer W. Heaton	11,455	26.45	0.0
N/A	Other	26	0.06	0.0
Total votes		43,315	100.0	–
