= Corydon Beckwith =

American judge

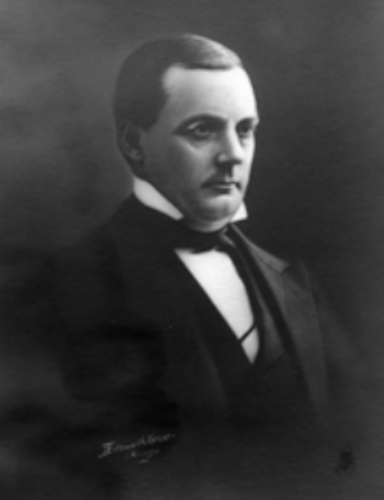
Beckwith's portrait at the Illinois Supreme Court.

Corydon Beckwith (July 24, 1823 – August 18, 1890) was an American jurist and lawyer.

Born in Caledonia County, Vermont, Beckwith studied law in St. Albans, Vermont and was admitted to the Vermont bar in 1844. In 1846, Beckwith was admitted to the Maryland bar. In 1853, Beckwith moved to Chicago, Illinois and practiced law. Beckwith was a Democrat. From January 1864 to June 1864, Beckwith served briefly in the Illinois Supreme Court. Beckwith resumed his law practice. Beckwith died in Chicago, Illinois.
