= Etta Josselyn Giffin =

American librarian

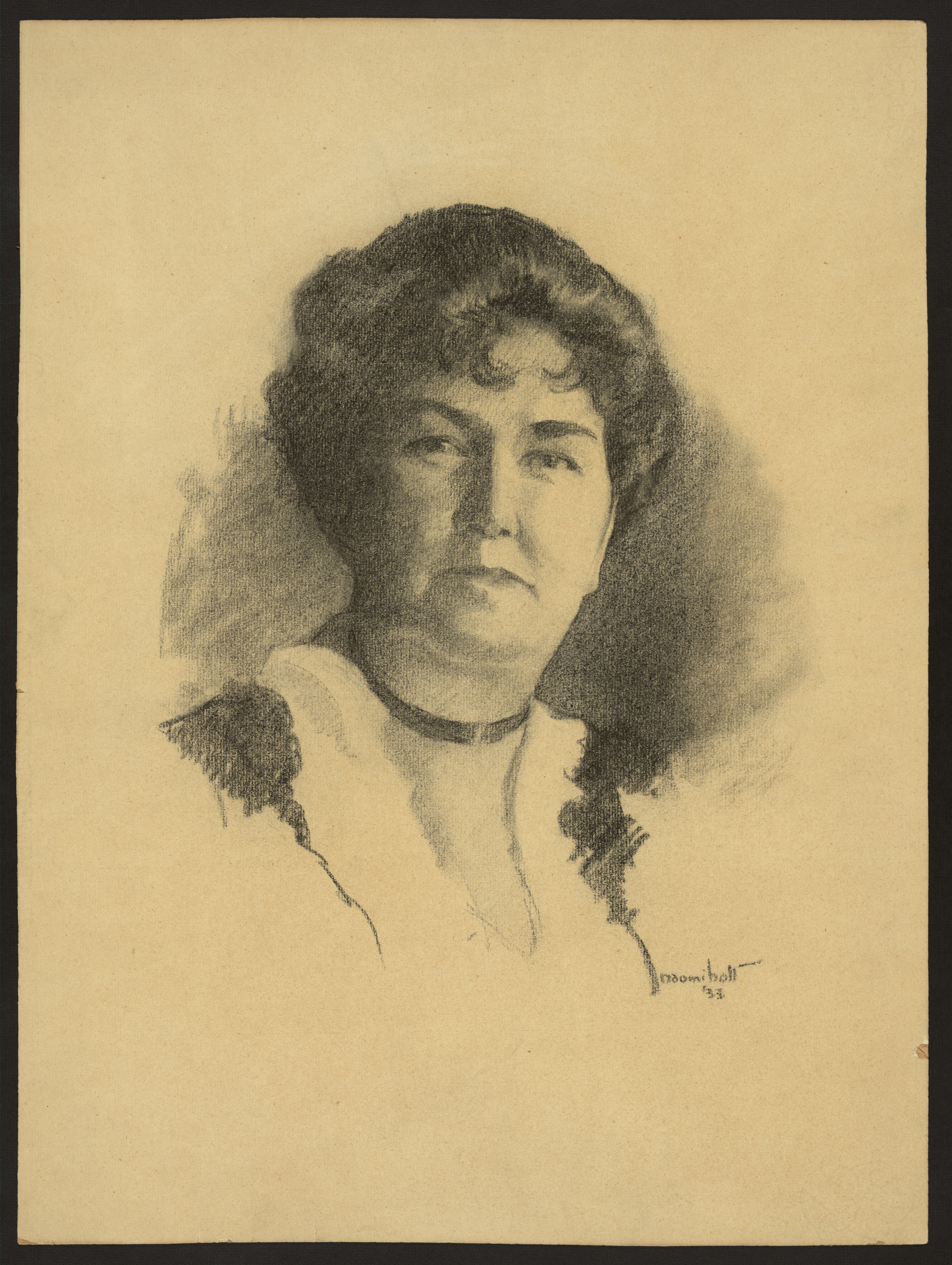
- "Miss Etta Josselyn Giffen" by Naomi Holt (1933)
- Born: Esther Josselyn Giffin; July 31, 1863; Newark, Ohio
- Died: July 29, 1932 (aged 69)
- Other names: Etta Josselyn Giffen
- Occupation: Librarian
- Known for: first director, National Library for the Blind

Esther "Etta" Josselyn Giffin (July 31, 1863 – July 29, 1932), sometimes seen as Etta Josselyn Giffen, was an American librarian. She was the first director of the National Library for the Blind in Washington, D.C., and a delegate to several international conferences on libraries and services for blind people.

== Early life and education ==
Giffin was born in Newark, Ohio, and raised in Ottawa, Kansas.

== Career ==
Giffin was the first director of the National Library for the Blind in Washington, D.C. Beginning in 1897 with basic braille texts and a reading room at the Library of Congress, she built a large and diverse collection of materials and established an entertainment schedule, including public readings, game tables with adapted cards and boards, and musical concerts, including works and performances by blind musicians and composers. She raised funds, and hired blind braille copyists to transcribe audio materials. The reading room was closed in 1911, and the library was incorporated as an independent organization in 1912, with Giffin as its director.

Giffin gave a lecture about her work at the American Association of Workers for the Blind, held in Boston in 1907. She was a delegate to at least five International Conferences on the Blind, in Brussels (1902), Edinburgh (1905), Manchester (1908), Vienna (1910), Cairo (1911), and London (1914). "I am happy to state that practical aid for the blind is finding its way rapidly into all parts of the world," she told a newspaper in 1911 on her return from Cairo. During and after World War I, she arranged for recreational and rehabilitation materials to be provided to military hospitals for American soldiers blinded in battle.

== Publications ==
- "Reading Room for the Blind, Library of Congress, Washington, D.C." (1907)
- "National Library for the Blind" (1925)

== Personal life ==
Giffin died in 1932, two days before her 69th birthday. She was the subject of a posthumous biography, Etta Josselyn Giffin: Pioneer Librarian for the Blind (1959) by Victoria Faber Stevenson, with an introduction by Helen Keller.
