= St. Albans Bay, Vermont =

- Village
- Location within Vermont
- Coordinates: 44°48′28″N 73°08′21″W
- Country: United States
- State: Vermont
- County: Franklin
- Elevation: 112 ft (34 m)
- Time zone: UTC-5 (Eastern (EST))
  - Summer (DST): UTC-4 (EDT)
- ZIP code: 05481
- Area code: 802
- GNIS feature ID: 1459308

St. Albans Bay is an unincorporated village in the town of St. Albans, Franklin County, Vermont, United States. The community is located along Vermont Route 36 on the eponymous bay of Lake Champlain, 2.8 miles (4.5 km) west of St. Albans City. St. Albans Bay has a post office with ZIP code 05481.
