= Seneca M. Dorr =

American politician (1820–1884)

Senece M. Dorr

23rd President pro tempore of the Vermont Senate
- In office 1865–1866
- Preceded by: Worthington C. Smith
- Succeeded by: George Whitman Hendee

Member of the Vermont Senate
- In office 1865–1866

Member of the Vermont House of Representatives
- In office 1863–1865

Personal details
- Born: Seneca Milo Dorr; August 14, 1820 Chatham, New York, U.S.
- Died: December 3, 1884 (aged 64) Rutland, Vermont, U.S.
- Party: Republican
- Other political affiliations: Free Soil; Democratic
- Spouse: Julia Caroline Ripley (m. 1847)
- Children: 5
- Occupation: Politician, lawyer, judge

Seneca Milo Dorr (August 14, 1820 – December 3, 1884) was an American lawyer, judge and politician who served as President of the Vermont Senate. He was the husband of writer Julia C. R. Dorr.

== Biography ==
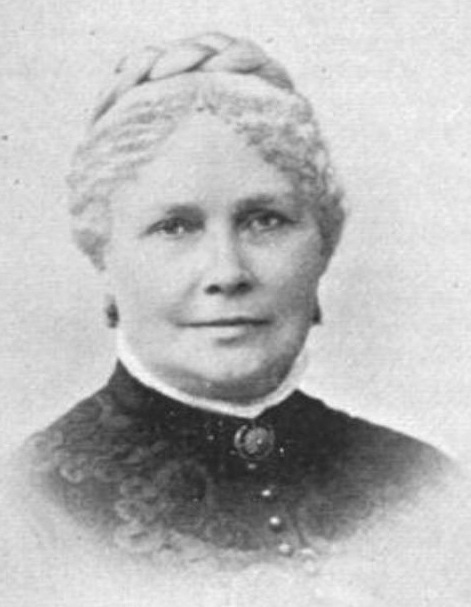
Julia C. R. Dorr, wife of Seneca M. Dorr.

Seneca Milo Dorr was born in Chatham Center, New York on August 14, 1820. An acquaintance of Martin Van Buren, he studied law, passed the bar, and practiced in Ghent. In 1857, he moved to the town of Rutland, Vermont, where he practiced law and became active in the marble business. Dorr also became involved in banking and stockbrokerage.

Originally a Democrat, Dorr opposed slavery and as a result joined the Free Soil movement and later became a Republican.

In 1863 Dorr served on the Vermont Council of Censors, and he was a member of the Vermont House of Representatives from 1863 to 1865. From 1865 to 1866, Dorr served in the Vermont Senate, and was the Senate's President pro tempore. From 1876 to 1877, Dorr served as Rutland County Assistant Judge.

Dorr died in Rutland on December 3, 1884.

== Family ==
Seneca Dorr married Julia Caroline Ripley on February 22, 1847. Seneca and Julia Dorr were the parents of Russell, William, Zulma, Joseph (who died in infancy) and Henry.

Julia Dorr's half-brothers and Seneca Dorr's brothers-in-law were Edward H. Ripley and William Y. W. Ripley, both prominent officers in the American Civil War.

Political offices
Preceded by Worthington C. Smith	President pro tempore of the Vermont State Senate; 1865 – 1866	Succeeded by George W. Hendee
