= William McLaren Bristol =

American businessman (1860–1935)

William McLaren Bristol (28 July 1860 – 1935) was one of the two co-founders of Bristol-Myers, now part of Bristol Myers Squibb. Myers and Bristol founded the company that would evolve into an international pharmaceutical giant in Bristol's birthplace of Clinton, New York in 1887. Bristol graduated from Hamilton College in 1887.

Shortly after graduating from college, Bristol had partnered with his college contemporary, John Ripley Myers, and purchased the failing Clinton Pharmaceutical Company for US$5000 that was located in upstate New York. The company found its first success with the release of a mineral salt laxative, Sal Hepatica, that helped with dyspepsia. This medicinal product proved profitable for the young entrepreneurs. By the time of his death in 1935, Bristol-Myers had become an international pharmaceutical conglomerate.
