= Edward H. Ripley =

American Civil War officer and Vermont businessman (1839–1915)

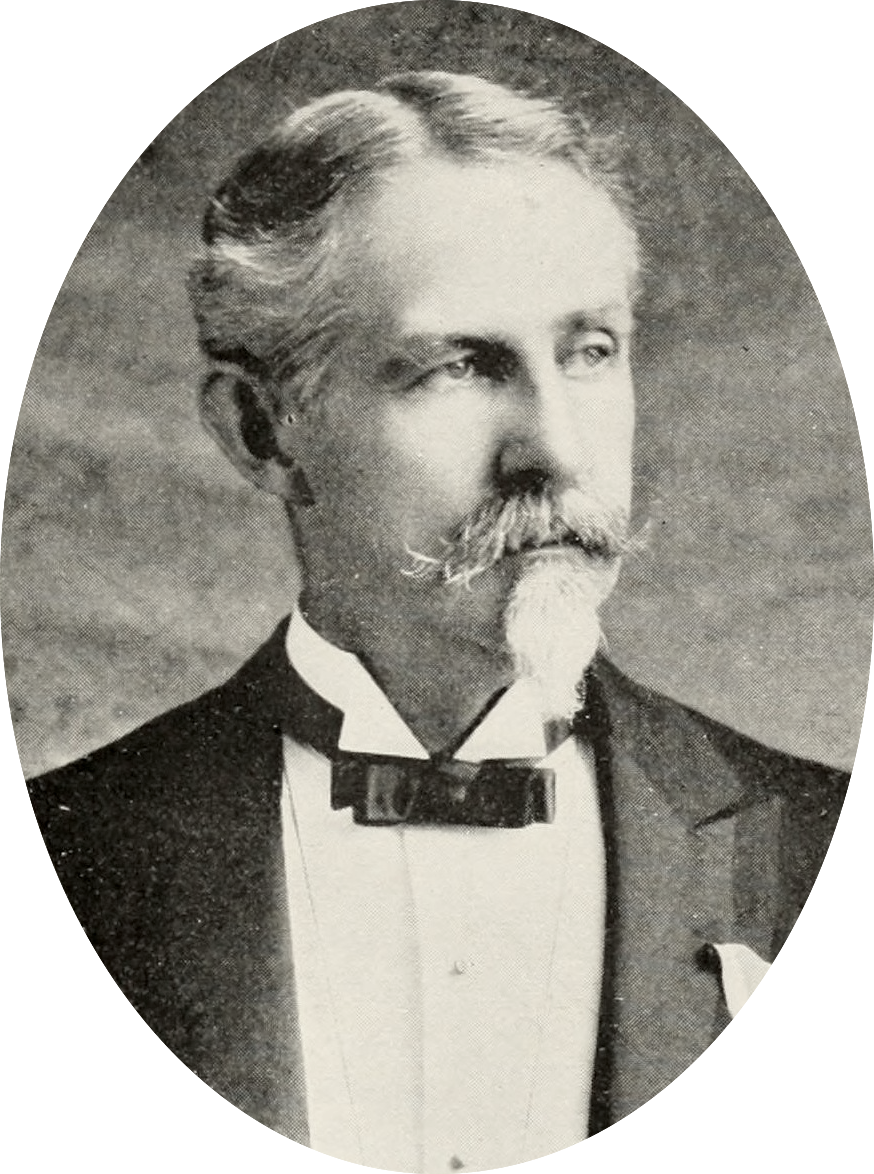
- Ripley in 1899
- Born: Edward Hastings Ripley; November 11, 1839; Rutland, Vermont, U.S.
- Died: September 14, 1915 (aged 75); Rutland, Vermont, U.S.
- Burial place: Evergreen Cemetery
- Education: Union College (BA)
- Military career
- Allegiance: United States
- Branch: United States Army
- Service years: 1862–1865
- Rank: Colonel; Brevet Brigadier General
- Commands: 9th Vermont Infantry; 1st Brigade, 2nd Division, XVIII Corps, Army of the James; 2nd Brigade, 2nd Division, XVIII Corps, Army of the James; 1st Brigade, 3rd Division, XXIV Corps, Army of the James
- Conflicts: American Civil War; Shenandoah Valley Campaign; Battle of Seven Pines; Battle of Harpers Ferry; Siege of Suffolk; Battle of Chaffin's Farm; Occupation of Richmond
- Other work: Businessperson; banker; horse breeder

Edward Hastings Ripley (November 11, 1839 – September 14, 1915) was a Vermont businessman and Union Army officer in the American Civil War. He attained the rank of brevet brigadier general while commanding brigades in the XVIII and XXIV Corps, and led the first troops to enter Richmond after its surrender.

== Early life ==
Edward H. Ripley was born in Rutland, Vermont on November 11, 1839. He was educated locally and at Troy Conference Academy in Poultney (later called Green Mountain College). He attended Union College from 1858 to 1862, and was a member of the Psi Upsilon fraternity.

== Civil War ==
Ripley left college near the end of his senior year to join the Army, enlisting as a private in the 9th Vermont Infantry in May 1862. Union College continued him on its student rolls and awarded him a Bachelor of Arts degree as a member of the Class of 1862.

He attained the rank of sergeant, and then was commissioned as a captain and appointed to command the regiment's Company B, which he led during action in the Shenandoah Valley Campaign in the summer of 1862, including the Siege of Suffolk, Virginia. He received a promotion to major that summer.

In September 1862 Ripley was among those taken prisoner at the Battle of Harpers Ferry. After he was exchanged in January 1863 he continued to serve with the 9th Vermont during action in Virginia and North Carolina throughout 1863. He was promoted to lieutenant colonel in May 1863, and received promotion to colonel and command of the regiment a week later.

He was subsequently appointed to command a military district in the area of Beaufort and New Bern, North Carolina. In August 1864 Ripley was promoted to brevet brigadier general and assigned to command 1st Brigade, 2nd Division, XVIII Corps, Army of the James. He later commanded the 2nd Brigade, including action at the Battle of Chaffin's Farm and the Second Battle of Fair Oaks. Ripley was wounded twice, and was later assigned to command 1st Brigade, 3rd Division, XXIV Corps, which was assigned to lead the Union troops into Richmond after the Confederate surrender, with orders to extinguish fires, prevent looting and maintain order.

Ripley commanded the military district which included Richmond until the city's civilian government was restored at the end of the war. When Abraham Lincoln visited Richmond from April 4 to 7, 1865, Ripley became aware of an assassination plot and met with Lincoln to urge him to take increased precautions for his safety. Lincoln declined, stating that it was more important that he be seen among the people as a sign that hostilities were over, and that if someone was determined to assassinate him, increased security would not prevent it.

Ripley mustered out of the service in June 1865.

== Post-Civil War ==
After the war Ripley returned to Vermont, also maintaining a residence in New York City. In partnership with his brother William he operated the Ripley Sons marble business until selling it to the Vermont Marble Company, which was operated by fellow Civil War veteran Redfield Proctor.

Ripley built the Holland House Hotel in New York City, which was owned by members of his wife's Van Doren family, and was responsible for the construction and operation of New Jersey’s Raritan River Railroad. He was a founder of the United States and Brazil Steamship Line and served on its board of directors. In addition, he served as President of the Rutland Marble Savings Bank, and Vice President of the Rutland County National Bank.

He also operated a successful horse breeding farm, with many of his animals being purchased for use in South America. The location of Ripley's farm is now the site of the Sugar & Spice restaurant and gift shop, a business which specializes in maple products. The burial site of the horse Ripley rode for most of the Civil War, "Old John", is preserved at the location.

A Republican, Ripley held local offices for the town of Rutland. He served in the Vermont House of Representatives from 1886 to 1887, representing the town of Mendon.

Ripley was active in the Reunion Society of Vermont Officers, and was elected President in 1887 and 1904. He was also an active member of the Grand Army of the Republic and the Military Order of the Loyal Legion of the United States.

Ripley's awards included an honorary master's degree from Norwich University (1910) and one from Union College (1915).

Edward Ripley spoke and wrote about his Civil War experiences, and his works included a speech which was subsequently printed in book form, The Capture and Occupation of Richmond, April 3, 1865 (1907). In addition, his diary was published in 1960 as Vermont General, The Unusual War Experiences of Edward Hastings Ripley, edited by Otto Eisenschiml.

== Death and burial ==
Ripley died in Rutland on September 14, 1915. He is buried in Rutland's Evergreen Cemetery.

== Family ==
In 1878 Edward H. Ripley married Amelia Dyckman Van Doren (1845–1931). They had two daughters: Alice Van Doren Ripley (1881–1948), the wife of Alexander deTrofimoff Ogden Jones (1878–1943), and Amelia Sybil Huntington (1882–1963), the wife of Raphael Welles Pumpelly. The Ripley daughters were married in a double ceremony in 1909.

Edward H. Ripley was the son of William Young Ripley, a prominent Vermont businessman and banker, and Jane Warren Ripley. Edward H. Ripley's siblings included: brother William Y. W. Ripley, a Civil War officer who received the Medal of Honor; and half-sister Julia Caroline Dorr, a famous poet and the wife of Seneca M. Dorr. His sister Helen was the mother of John Ripley Myers.

The writer Clements Ripley was the grandson of William Y. W. Ripley and the grand-nephew of Edward H. Ripley.
