= William Y. W. Ripley =

American Civil War Union Army officer

William Young Warren Ripley
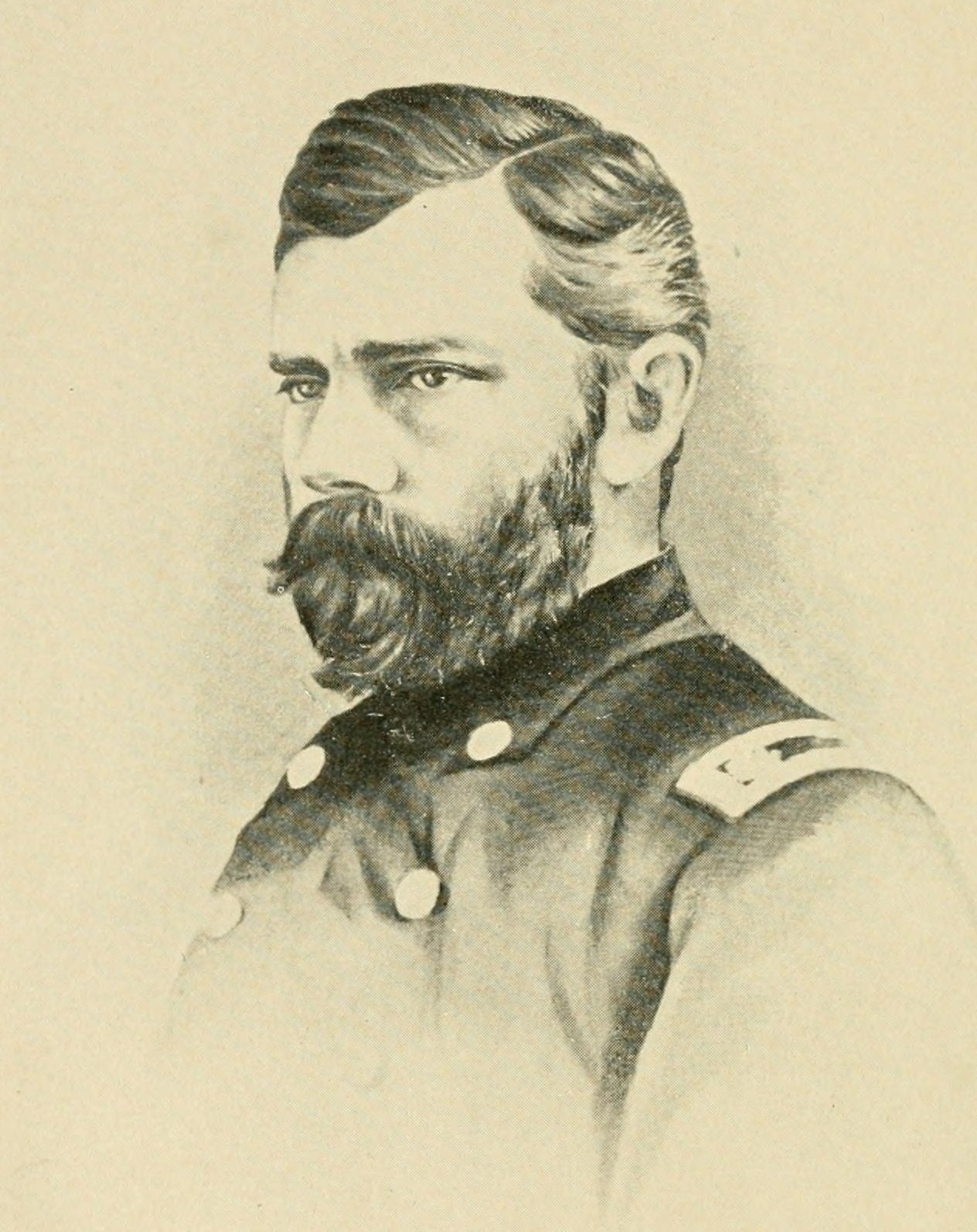
- Born: December 31, 1832; Middlebury, Vermont, US
- Died: December 16, 1905 (aged 72); Rutland, Vermont, US
- Burial place: Evergreen Cemetery; Rutland, Vermont
- Military career
- Allegiance: United States of America; Vermont
- Branch: Union Army; Vermont Militia
- Service years: 1858 – 1861 (Militia); 1861 – 1862 (Army); 1864 – 1866 (Militia)
- Rank: Lieutenant Colonel (Army); Major General (Militia)
- Units: 1st Vermont Infantry; 1st United States Sharpshooters
- Commands: 1st Division, Vermont Militia
- Conflicts: American Civil War; Battle of Big Bethel; Battle of Malvern Hill
- Awards: Medal of Honor
- Other work: Businessperson; Banker

Signature
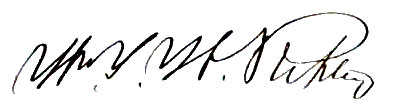

William Young Warren Ripley (December 31, 1832 – December 16, 1905) was a Union Army officer from Vermont in the American Civil War. He received the Medal of Honor for heroism at the Battle of Malvern Hill.

== Early life ==
William Y. W. Ripley was born in Middlebury, Vermont, on December 31, 1832. He was educated at the Troy Conference Academy in Poultney (now Green Mountain College) and the Lima Institute, in Lima, New York. He then began a career in Rutland at the Ripley family's marble business and the Ripley family-owned Rutland County National Bank.

== Military service ==
Beginning in 1858, Ripley was a lieutenant in the Rutland Light Guards, a volunteer militia unit commanded by Horace Henry Baxter.

Baxter subsequently became adjutant general of the Vermont Militia. In May 1861 Ripley entered the Union Army for the Civil War as captain and commander of the Rutland Light Guards, which was mustered in as Company K, 1st Vermont Volunteer Infantry Regiment. He served with the regiment in Washington, D.C. and Virginia during the entire three months of its service, including taking part in the Battle of Big Bethel.

In the Fall of 1861 Ripley joined the 1st United States Sharpshooters as lieutenant colonel and second in command. He took part in several battles, including the Battle of Malvern Hill in July 1862, at which he was seriously wounded. Ripley's wounds proved serious enough to prevent him from returning to the field.

In August 1862 he was appointed commander of the 10th Vermont Infantry with the rank of colonel, but declined because of the physical disability caused by his wounds.

In 1864 he was appointed to command the 1st Division of the Vermont Militia with the rank of major general. The militia had an active role providing patrols and security within the state and along the border with Canada, particularly following the October 1864 St. Albans Raid. He served until a post-Civil War reorganization of the militia eliminated the division headquarters.

== Medal of Honor ==
At the Battle of Malvern Hill Ripley was commended for returning to the rear at a critical juncture in the fight to bring up two regiments that had been in reserve, which he then led into battle himself. He continued to fight until a bullet struck his leg and he had to be carried from the field.

In 1893 Ripley was awarded the Medal of Honor for heroism at the Battle of Malvern Hill. The citation reads:

The President of the United States of America, in the name of Congress, takes pleasure in presenting the Medal of Honor to Lieutenant Colonel William Young Warren Ripley, United States Army, for extraordinary heroism on 1 July 1862, while serving with 1st U.S. Sharpshooters, in action at Malvern Hill, Virginia. At a critical moment Lieutenant Colonel Ripley brought up two regiments, which he led against the enemy himself, being severely wounded.

General Orders:

Date of Issue: March 11, 1893 Action Date: July 1, 1862

Service: Army Rank: Lieutenant Colonel

Division: 1st U.S. Sharpshooters

== Later life ==
After the Civil War Ripley returned to his family's business interests, operating the marble company with his brother Edward as Ripley Sons, and serving on the board of directors and as president of the Rutland County National Bank.

In 1867 Ripley was elected president of the Reunion Society of Vermont Officers, succeeding George J. Stannard, who had been the organization's first president. He was also active in the Military Order of the Loyal Legion of the United States, the Grand Army of the Republic, and the Medal of Honor Legion.

In 1889 the Ripleys sold the marble business to the Vermont Marble Company, headed by fellow Civil War veteran Redfield Proctor.

A Republican, Ripley was a delegate to the 1868 Republican National Convention. In 1880 he was a presidential elector, and cast his ballot for the Garfield and Arthur ticket.

The city of Rutland was organized separately from the town in the late 1800s, and Ripley served as the city's mayor from 1899 to 1900, succeeding Percival W. Clement.

Ripley authored a history of his Civil War experiences, 1883's Vermont Riflemen in the War for the Union.

== Death and burial ==
Ripley died in Rutland on December 16, 1905. He was buried in Rutland's Evergreen Cemetery.

== Family ==
William Y. W. Ripley was the brother of Edward H. Ripley. E. H. Ripley served in the Civil War as commander of the 9th Vermont Infantry Regiment. As a brevet brigadier general, he commanded brigades in the XVIII and XXIV Corps. He led some of the first troops to enter Richmond following the Lee's retreat, and warned Lincoln of a plot to assassinate him when he visited Virginia during the waning days of the war.

Julia Caroline Dorr, the wife of Seneca M. Dorr, was the half-sister of William and Edward Ripley.

William Y. W. Ripley was married to Cornelia Ann Thomas Ripley. Their children included: Hastings Warren Ripley (January 30, 1871 – April 24, 1871); Mary Elizabeth Ripley Pease (1857–1936); William Thomas Ripley (1860–1893); Janet Warren Ripley Dorr (1863–1954); Thomas Emerson Ripley (1865–1956); and Charles Edward Ripley (1867–1893).

Thomas E. Ripley was the father of author and screenwriter Clements Ripley.

William Y. W. Ripley's sister Helen was the mother of John Ripley Myers.

The son of Clements Ripley, William Y. W. Ripley (1921–2013), called Warren, was a notable South Carolina newspaper editor and historian.
