= Julia C. R. Dorr =

American poet (1825–1913)

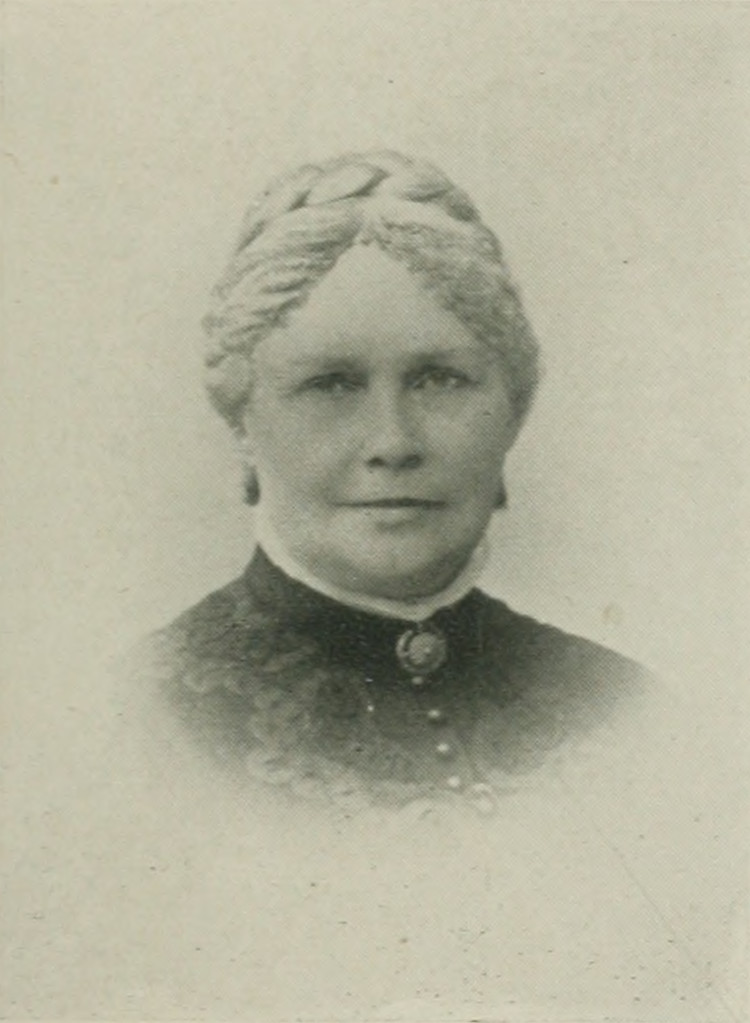
- "A Woman of the Century"
- Born: Julia Caroline Ripley; February 13, 1825; Charleston, South Carolina, U.S.
- Died: January 18, 1913 (aged 87)
- Resting place: Evergreen Cemetery
- Occupation: Author
- Spouse: Seneca M. Dorr (m. 1847; died 1884)
- Relatives: Edward H. Ripley (half-brother); William Y. W. Ripley (half-brother)

Julia Caroline Ripley Dorr (February 13, 1825 – January 18, 1913) was an American author who published both prose and poetry. Although she wrote a number of novels and works on travel, she was best known for her poetry. Her work was conservative; she did not write anything that she felt was improper for children to hear, and was described as consisting of "respectable but not highly distinguished or passionate phrases to the conventional wisdom of her time and place". She had a keen sense of form and, working as she did in several mediums, to her belonged the distinction of never attempting to say in verse what might better find expression in prose. To her sense of form she added a clear-seeing eye, and the ability so to fit words together as to make others see what she saw.

Her books include Farmingdale (1854), Leanmere (1856), Sibyl Huntington (1869), Poems (1872), Expiation (1873), Friar Anselmo and Other Poems (1879), The Legend of the Baboushka,—a Christmas Poem (1881), Daybreak,— an Easter Poem (1882), Bermuda,—an Idyl of the Summer Islands (1884), and Afternoon Songs (1885).

== Early life and education ==
Julia Caroline Ripley was born in Charleston, South Carolina, on February 13, 1825. Her mother, Zulma De Lacy Thomas, shared a mingled Huguenot and Catholic descent. Her maternal grandparents were natives of France, who fled to South Carolina from San Domingo (i.e. Haiti) at the time of the successful slave insurrection in that island, near the close of the 18th century. Her father, William Young Ripley, was born in Middlebury, Vermont, the son of one of Vermont's pioneers, and it is through him that she was descended from some of New England's founders, including William Bradford, governor of Plymouth Colony, and William Ripley, who arrived in Hingham, Massachusetts, in 1638.

She referred to her early girlhood as the most eventful part of her life. There was the long journey to Vermont the summer she was 18 months old, and her young mother's death only four days after reaching the state which it had been hoped would give her health. There was the sojourn in New York, where William had established himself in business, and where he wanted his little daughter's company. Clear and vivid was her memory of that trip down the Hudson River taken with her father when she was three years old, and of their arrival at the small boarding school on then fashionable Bleecker Street. At six, she was back in Middlebury, browsing in her father's large and well chosen library —she could not remember the time when she did not know how to read—a library established in a newly built house four miles up the Otter from Middlebury village in a quarter of the town called Farmingdale, a house presided over by a new step-mother. Here, also she recited daily lessons to her father and did her daily "stent" of sewing or knitting. Dorr grew to womanhood in a home of culture and refinement, and it is here where she began writing as a little child. It is here also that the father engaged in business again, and devoted himself chiefly to the development of the Rutland marble quarries. The home also included her half-brothers, Edward H. Ripley and Major General William Y. W. Ripley, both of whom became prominent officers in the American Civil War.

Schooling came to her, as it was apt to come to a girl of her period, intermittently and in variety. She spent a year in a small boarding school in Plattsburg; an interval at a school kept at the Shurtliff homestead in Middlebury; attendance at the Middlebury Female Semimary; a winter at a village Academy in Rutland, where she recited Latin with boys preparing to enter college as sophomores; and a term or two at "Old T. C. A." It was at Middlebury, in a one-story school house on Pleasant Street, that she began the study of Latin, the subject of all others most useful in her adult life, as she declared. There, too, under Father Merrill, she wrote on the blackboard the list of English kings from Julius Caesar to William the Fourth, without a blunder. The feat was recalled by President John M. Thomas when in 1910 he conferred on her the degree of Doctor of Letters from Middlebury College, an honor which with characteristic modesty she accepted as a tribute to the women of her generation.

== Career ==
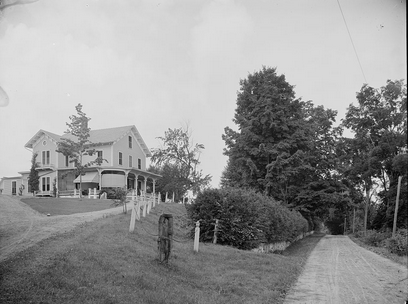
"The Maples"

On February 22, 1847, she married Seneca M. Dorr, of New York. After her marriage, for a decade they lived in an old Dutch manor house in Ghent, New York. In that house, the first three of her five children were born, and there her public literary life began. In 1847, he sent one of her poems, without her knowledge, to the Union Magazine, and this was her first published poem. In the following year, her first published story, "Isabel Leslie", gained a US$100 prize offered by Sartain's Magazine. Edward Everett Hale and James Russell Lowell were also among the prize winners. The Dorr family then pulled up stakes and started for the far west by way of Rutland. The intended visit turned into something far different as they built a new home, "The Maples".

=== Prose ===
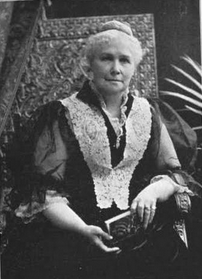
Julia Dorr, c. 1897

Her work constantly appeared in the best publications, and her books followed each other at intervals through 1885, when the volume Afternoon Songs appeared. Her books included: Farmingdale (New York, 1854), Lanmere (New York, 1855), Sybil Huntington (New York, 1869), Poems (Philadelphia, 1871), Expiation (Philadelphia, 1873), Friar Anselmo and Other Poems (New York, 1879), The Legend of the Babouhka (New York, 1881), Daybreak (New York, 1882), Bermuda (New York. 1884), Afternoon Songs (New York, 1885). Her stories were particularly skillful in detail and plot, and in the interpretation of the New England character.

A series of essays on marriage, contributed by Dorr to a New England journal under the titles "Letters to a Young Wife" and "Letters to a Young Husband" appeared in book-form without her sanction, with the title Bride and Bridegroom (Cincinnati, 1873). Her travel books, including Bermuda, were in demand by tourists. Two other graphic travel books were the result of a couple of British summers: The Flower of England's Face and A Cathedral Pilgrimage. In King's Houses was a romance for young people, its scene laid in the days of Queen Anne.

=== Poetry ===
The actuality of experience which occasioned the travel-sketches formed a great part of her poetry. Most of her lyrics took shape from happenings, large and small. The sonnet was her favorite verse form. Its very restrictions enticed her. "Whom the Gods Love", "Recognition", "Largesse", and "Awakening" were just a few of her sonnets. The American Civil War, in which fought her distinguished half-brothers, General W. Y. W. Ripley and General E. H. Ripley, moved her to patriotic verse. Her ode, "Vermont", was written for the centennial celebration at Bennington, Vermont in 1877; "The Voice of the Tower", for the dedication of the Ethan Allen Monument at Burlington. Dorr's poems were characterized by strength and melody, sweetness and sympathy, a thorough knowledge of poetic technique, and through all, a high purpose which rendered such work of lasting value. One of her poems was included in Emerson's 1894 anthology Parnassus.

=== Later writing ===
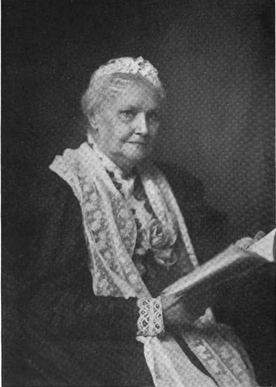
Julia Dorr, c. 1912

It is obvious by the titles of her later books that she had not anticipated them in any long look ahead. The Complete Edition of her poems –this completeness came to amuse her– was printed in 1892. Afternoon Songs had appeared seven years earlier. Afterglow followed in 1900. In her 80s, she published Beyond the Sunset, laughing at the sequence as at a pleasant joke that life had played upon her. Almost half the poems in that last little volume were written within a year and a half of her 85th birthday, but she did not stop with them. On the title page of the book she had chosen to write the words Tennyson put into the mouth of voyage-hungry Ulysses,

My purpose holds
To sail beyond the sunset and the baths
Of all the western stars until I die.

Much of writing in later years included letters with her friends, such as Edmund Clarence Stedman and Oliver Wendell Holmes.

== Influence and reception ==
Dorr belonged by friendship and association to that New England group of poets and writers famous in American literature through the names of Longfellow, Emerson, Whittier, Holmes, and Lowell. They knew her as a workman of like temper with themselves and a woman of rare companionableness and power. The group following these, that including Thomas Bailey Aldrich, Edmund Clarence Stedman, and William Dean Howells, also knew and valued her both as friend and fellow craftsman. In his American Anthology Stedman wrote, "Mrs. Dorr holds a distinguished and enviable position among American women." Writing of Dorr in his book, The Builders of American Literature, Francis H. Underwood remarked, "If one can judge from her poems, she must lead an ideal life." She was represented in The Lyric Year, a collection of the best American verse of 1912, limited to 100 poems culled from many thousands submitted.

== Personal life ==
From "The Maples," her Rutland home, Dorr became involved in her community, leading the work of broadening women's interests. For 33 years, she was president of "The Fortnightly," her church's literary society. Many authors came to the Maples, among them was Emerson, who was searching the vicinity for his grandfather's grave. At the Atlantic breakfast given in honor of Dr. Holmes' 70th birthday, Dorr was warned that Emerson, shadowed as he then was by loss of memory, might not know her. But the minute he saw her, he exclaimed, "Oh, Mrs. Dorr, I shall never forget the view of Killington from your piazza!" Here, too, came authors' second-selves, their books, inscribed by their own hands; and authors' letters, both congratulatory and purely friendly, Longfellow's, Whittier's, Emerson's—covering many years—Dr. Holmes', the one she knew best of the Cambridge group, Stedman's, R. H. Stoddard's, his wife's, Howells', and many other makers of literature. One of the pleasantest consequences of her last public appearance at the Howells' birthday dinner was the personal touch it gave her with the English poet, William Watson.

In 1884, the year of her husband's death, Dorr became the leader of a group of women who founded the Rutland Free Library. She served as president of the association, and gave to the library, in memory of her husband, what was said to be the finest and most complete collection of books on political science to be found in New England at the time, and one of the best in the English-speaking world outside of the University of Cambridge.

She died January 18, 1913. Dorr was buried at Evergreen Cemetery in Rutland.

== Selected works ==
Prose

- Isabel Leslie (1848) short story
- Farmingdale (1854) novel
- Lanmere (1856) novel
- Sybil Huntingdon (1869) novel
- Expiation (1872) novel
- Bride and Bridegroom (1873) – described as "sentimental advice to married young couples"
- Bermuda – An Idyll of the Summer Islands (1884) travel
- The Flower of England's Face (1895) travel
- A Cathedral Pilgrimage (1896) travel
- In King's Houses (1898) novel – a story of England under Queen Anne

Poetry

- Poems (1871)
- Friar Anselmo and Other Poems (1879)
- Daybreak: An Easter Poem (1872)
- The Legend of the Baboushka – A Christmas poem (1881)
- Afternoon Songs (1885)
- Poems...Complete Edition (1892)
- Afterglow (1900)
- Beyond the Sunset (1909)
- Last Poems (1913)
