= National Library for the Blind (United States) =

Coordinates: 38.90041°N 77.04108°W

The National Library for the Blind was an American philanthropic and educational institution.

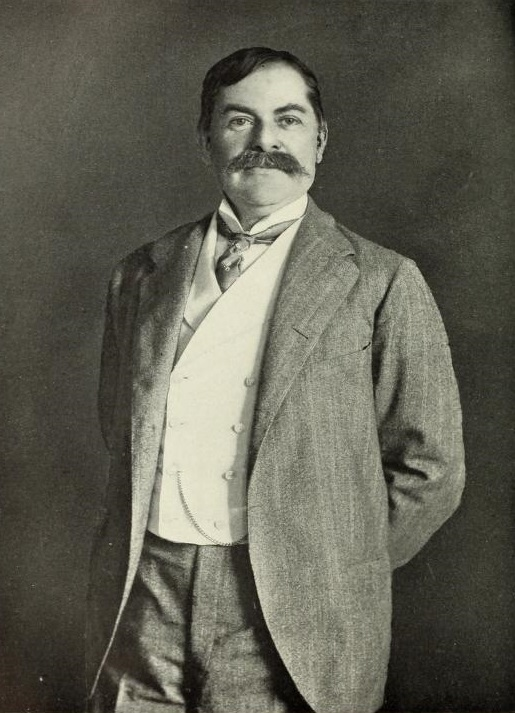
Thomas Nelson Page

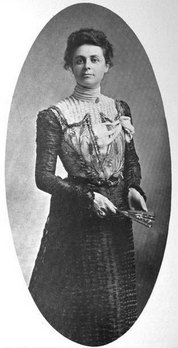
Sara Weeks Roberts

The National Library for the Blind was incorporated December 26, 1911, and was located at 1729 H Street, Washington, D.C. The American ambassador to Italy, the Hon. Thomas Nelson Page, was the first president. He was succeeded by Sara Weeks Roberts. Thereupon, Page was made the honorary president. Etta Josselyn Giffin was the library's first director.

The object of the library was to furnish the sightless, in their own homes, interesting and up-to-date literature. The books were carefully selected, and consisted of history, biography, travels, and novels suitable for the adult, and were in constant circulation to readers in 44 states. By an act of Congress, embossed reading matter for the blind was sent free by mail to any part of the U.S. This was a great boon to the sightless, as necessarily the volumes were large and heavy, and the expense of transportation would make their general circulation prohibitive.

A blind woman had charge of the records and distribution of books. Paper was prepared, type set, and the books embossed by blind employees; and the sightless also, in their homes, were paid for transcribing, all work being returned to the library to be proof read, corrected, shellacked, eyeleted, and bound by the blind employees, under the oversight of the director. The library sent out catalogues, both in printed ink and embossed type, the latter enabling the blind themselves to select books they wished to read. A book of instructions and a slate and stylus were sent to those desiring to learn to transcribe in English Braille.
