= 1st Vermont Infantry Regiment =

- Active: May 2, 1861 to August 15, 1861
- Disbanded: August 15, 1861
- Allegiance: United States
- Branch: United States Army
- Type: Infantry
- Engagements: American Civil War: Battle of Big Bethel

Commanders
- Colonel: John W. Phelps
- Lt. Col.: Peter T. Washburn

The 1st Vermont Infantry Regiment was a three months' infantry regiment in the Union Army during the American Civil War. It served in the eastern theater, in and around Fortress Monroe, Virginia.

== History ==
Responding to President Abraham Lincoln's call in mid-April 1861, for 75,000 men to serve for three months to help put down the rebellion, Governor Erastus Fairbanks ordered the recruitment of the regiment.

The regiment was organized from militia companies from the following towns:

- A – Swanton
- B – Woodstock
- C – St. Albans
- D – Bradford
- E – Cavendish
- F – Northfield
- G – Brandon
- H – Burlington
- I – Middlebury
- K – Rutland

Captain John W. Phelps, of Brattleboro, an 1836 graduate of the United States Military Academy, and a 23-year veteran of the regular army, was chosen to command the regiment and commissioned as a colonel. Militia Captain Peter T. Washburn of Woodstock, later Adjutant General and Governor of Vermont, was appointed lieutenant colonel. Among the officers were Roswell Farnham, William Y. W. Ripley, and Albert B. Jewett.

The ten companies rendezvoused at Rutland, on May 2, 1861, and went into camp on the fairgrounds south of the city, called Camp Fairbanks, in honor of the governor. The regiment was mustered into United States service on May 8, and the next day departed for New York City, where it arrived on May 10. Rutland businessman Horace Henry Baxter, then serving as Adjutant General of the Vermont Militia, used personal funds to ensure that 1st Vermont soldiers were equipped and paid, and he rode at their head as they left Vermont. On May 11, the regiment embarked the steamer Alabama, and arrived at Fortress Monroe on May 13.

On May 23, the regiment made the first reconnaissance upon Virginia soil by United States troops, marching six miles from Fortress Monroe to Hampton. On May 26, the regiment took the steamers Cataline and Monticello, up Hampton Roads to Newport News, where they made camp, which ended up being their home for the rest of its stay in Virginia.

On June 10, five companies of the 1st Vermont, along with five companies of the 4th Massachusetts Infantry, were at the Battle of Big Bethel.

On August 4, the regiment embarked the steamers Ben de Ford and . R. Spaulding, and sailed to New Haven, Connecticut, then took a train to Brattleboro, arriving there on August 9. The men were paid off and mustered out on August 15 and 16.

The regiment mustered in 38 officers and 743 enlisted men. One enlisted man was killed in action, four died of disease, and one died due to an accident. One officer resigned his commission, four enlisted men were discharged for disability, and two deserted. Five-sixths of the members of this regiment subsequently enlisted for three years. Two hundred and fifty served as field and line officers in Vermont and neighboring states' units.

== See also ==
- Vermont in the Civil War
- Battle of Big Bethel
- Vermont National Guard
