= John W. Phelps =

Union Army general from Vermont (1813–1885)

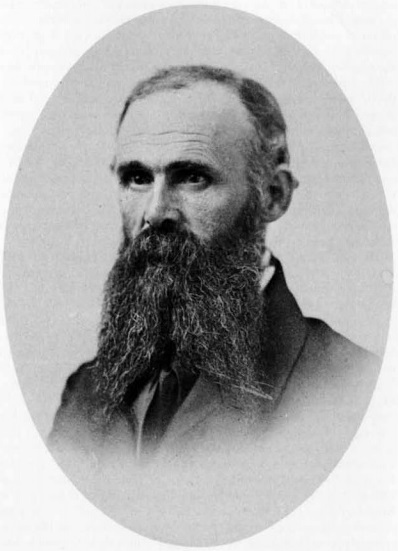
- John Wolcott Phelps
- Born: John Wolcott Phelps; November 13, 1813; Guilford, Vermont
- Died: February 1, 1885 (aged 71); Guilford, Vermont
- Burial place: Christ Church Cemetery, Guilford, Vermont
- Military career
- Allegiance: United States of America; Union
- Branch: United States Army; Union Army
- Service years: 1836–1859; 1861–1862
- Rank: Brigadier General
- Unit: 4th U.S. Artillery
- Commands: 1st Vermont Infantry
- Conflicts: Seminole Wars; Mexican–American War; Utah War; American Civil War

John Wolcott Phelps (November 13, 1813 – February 1, 1885) was a general in the Union Army during the American Civil War, a writer, an abolitionist and presidential candidate.

== Soldier and abolitionist ==
Phelps was born in Guilford, Vermont, the son of Judge John and Lucy (Lovell) Phelps. He was appointed to the United States Military Academy on July 1, 1832, and graduated on July 1, 1836, with the brevet rank of Second Lieutenant, and was assigned to the 4th U.S. Artillery. He was promoted to Second Lieutenant on July 28, 1836, and promoted to First Lieutenant on July 7, 1838. He fought in the Creek and Seminole War in 1838, and participated in the Trail of Tears that same year. Between the autumn of 1839 and 1842, he was stationed in Detroit to guard the Canadian border. He then held garrison and recruiting duties from 1842 to 1846.

During the Mexican–American War, Phelps served at the Battle of Monterey, the Siege of Veracruz, and the Battle for Mexico City. He was brevetted Captain for his conduct at the battles of Contreras and Churubusco, but unusually declined the promotion. He received a full promotion to Captain on March 31, 1850 and served on the Mormon Expedition between 1857 and 1859. In his diaries, he wrote about the Mormon faith with extreme disdain. "Where else than in America could such a flat and puerile invention become enshrined as an established belief. From what trunk except one of the most vigeorous of free institutions could such a fungus of absolutism arise?" In a December 1857 letter he compared Mormonism to a "snake coiled in the desert and concluded that it, like the snake, should be smitten immediately." He was a strong advocate for use of military means to suppress what he viewed as the Mormon threat to American republicanism.

He resigned from the army on November 2, 1859. At the beginning of the Civil War, he resided in Brattleboro, Vermont, where he wrote forceful articles pointing out the danger of the constantly increasing political influence of the slave states.

== Civil War ==
On May 2, 1861, Phelps was appointed Colonel of the 1st Vermont Infantry and was mustered into U.S. service on May 9. His regiment arrived at Fortress Monroe, Virginia, on May 13. Shortly after, he was promoted to brigadier general on May 17, 1861. On May 27, commanding the 1st Vermont Infantry, 4th Massachusetts Infantry and 7th New York Infantry, Phelps moved 10 miles to Newport News, at the mouth of the James River.

In November, 1861, he was transferred to the Department of the Gulf under Major General Benjamin F. Butler, and Phelps left on an expedition to the Gulf of Mexico where his regiment took military possession of Ship Island, Mississippi. His regiment supported Commodore David Farragut's fleet in forcing open the Lower Mississippi in April, 1862. They participated in taking possession of Fort Jackson and St. Philip, Louisiana at the Battle of Forts Jackson and St. Philip, which was instrumental in the capture of New Orleans, the largest city of the Confederacy, on May 1, 1862.

== Organizing of black troops ==
Phelps was afterward stationed at Camp Parapet in Carrollton, seven miles from New Orleans. Many fugitive slaves arrived at the camp seeking refuge. Phelps organized the black men of military age into companies and formally asked Butler for arms for the blacks, believing he could organize three regiments of them to help defend his camp. Butler ordered Phelps to put the men to work cutting down trees around the camp, and instead of furnishing guns, ordered his quartermaster to send axes and tents for the fugitive slaves. Phelps was unwilling to employ the black men as mere laborers, becoming what he viewed as their slave-driver, "having no qualification that way," and offered his resignation on August 21, 1862. Butler refused to accept it. Later that August, Phelps returned his commission to President Abraham Lincoln.

At New Orleans, Phelps had organized a few squads of Negroes and drilled them daily. . . . Not knowing what to do with so many Negroes, Butler at first returned the runaway slaves to their masters. But still the contrabands came. Some of them were employed as cooks, nurses, washwomen, and laborers. . . . [Finally] Butler ordered . . . the exclusion of all unemployed Negroes and whites from his lines.

Admiral David Dixon Porter, who had assisted Commodore Farragut in capturing New Orleans, branded Phelps "a crazy man," and Butler called him "mad as a March Hare on the 'nigger question.'"

After Lincoln issued the Emancipation Proclamation on January 1, 1863, the federal administration adopted a policy of organizing United States Colored Troops. The President offered Phelps a Major General's commission. Phelps wanted the commission backdated to the day of his resignation the prior year. The President could not allow the implied contravention of Butler's original orders, which were in good standing for that time, and would not agree to Phelps' terms.

For his organization of and attempt to arm escaped slaves, Confederate President Jefferson Davis issued an order on August 21, 1862, declaring Phelps an outlaw, for having "organized and armed negro slaves for military service against their masters, citizens of the Confederacy." Black federal soldiers were condemned by the Confederacy as robbers and criminals, punishable by death. Many were warned by their officers before going into battle that they would be executed if captured.

== Presidential candidate ==
Leaving military service, Phelps returned to Brattleboro, Vermont, where he became President of the Vermont Teacher's Association from 1865 to 1885. He lived in Brattleboro until 1883, when he married Anna Bardwell Davis. They moved back to his birthplace, Guilford, Vermont, and had a son the following year. He traveled across Europe and the United States, developing a reputation as a scholar and linguist. He authored Phelps Elementary Reader for Public Schools Good Behavior (1876), and translated from the French three books: the Lucien de la Hodde's The Cradle of Rebellions: A History of the Secret Societies of France, The Island of Madagascar: A Sketch, Descriptive and Historical (1885), and The Fables of Florian (1888). He became very active in the Vermont Historical Society.

Phelps was the candidate for the Anti-Masonic Party for president in 1880. (Note: Phelps appeared under four party designations, which varied by state: Anti-Masonic, Anti-Secret, National American, and American.) His running mate was Samuel C. Pomeroy of Kansas who four years later in 1884 would seek the White House as the presidential candidate of the American Prohibition National Party. In the 1880 race, the Phelps/Pomeroy ticket garnered only 1,045 votes nationwide. They ran on an eleven-point platform calling for such things as the prohibition of alcoholic beverages, the prohibition of all secret lodges, justice for Indians, demanding the Bible be a required text in all educational institutions; and the abolition of the electoral college.

He was vice president of the Vermont Historical Society from 1863 to 1885, and reported on the discovery of mammoth remains in Brattleboro and Richmond.

Phelps died in Guilford on February 1, 1885.

== See also ==
- List of American Civil War generals (Union)

== Notes ==
Preceded by James B. Walker	Anti-Masonic Party presidential candidate 1880 (lost)	Succeeded by (none)
