= 10th Vermont Infantry Regiment =

- Active: September 1, 1862, to June 22, 1865
- Country: United States
- Allegiance: Union
- Branch: Infantry
- Size: 1,304
- Engagements: Bristoe Campaign; Battle of Mine Run; Battle of the Wilderness; Battle of Spotsylvania Court House; Battle of North Anna; Battle of Cold Harbor; Battle of Jerusalem Plank Road; Battle of Monocacy; Valley Campaigns of 1864; Third Battle of Winchester; Battle of Fisher's Hill; Battle of Cedar Creek; Siege of Petersburg; Battle of Sayler's Creek

The 10th Vermont Infantry Regiment was an infantry regiment in the Union Army during the American Civil War.

== Service ==
The 10th Vermont Infantry was organized at Brattleboro, Vermont, and mustered in for three years service on September 1, 1862, under the command of Colonel Albert Burton Jewett.

The regiment was attached to Grover's Brigade, Military District of Washington, until February 1863, Jewett's Brigade, Provisional Division, XXII Corps, Dept. of Washington, until June 1863, French's Command, VIII Corps, Middle Department, until July 1863, 1st Brigade, 3rd Division, III Corps, Army of the Potomac, until March 1864, and 1st Brigade, 3rd Division, VI Corps, Army of the Potomac and Army of the Shenandoah, Middle Military Division, until June 1865.

The 10th Vermont Infantry was mustered out of service at Washington, D.C., on June 22, 1865. Afterwards, recruits were transferred to the 5th Vermont Infantry.

== Detailed service record ==
The timeline of the 10th Vermont Infantry service included:

- 1862
  - Moved to Washington, D.C., September 6–8.
  - Camp at Arlington Heights until September 14, 1862.
  - March to Seneca Locks, Md., September 14–17.
  - Guard duty along the Potomac from Edward's Ferry to Muddy Branch until October 11 and at Seneca Creek until November 13.
  - At Offutt's Cross Roads until December 21.
  - Moved to Poolesville December 21
- 1863
  - Duty at White's Ford (Companies C, E, H, and I); at mouth of the Monocacy (Companies A, F, and D); at Conrad's Ferry (Companies B, G, and K) until April 19, 1863.
  - At Poolesville, Md., to June 24.
  - Moved to Harper's Ferry, W. Va., June 24–26, thence to Frederick, Md., June 30, and to Monocacy July 2.
  - Pursuit of Lee July 6–23.
  - Wapping Heights July 23.
  - At Routt's Hill August 1-September 15.
  - At Culpeper until October 8.
  - Bristoe Campaign October 9–22.
  - Auburn and Bristoe October 14.
  - Advance to the Rappahannock November 7–8.
  - Kelly's Ford November 7.
  - Brandy Station November 8.
  - Mine Run Campaign November 26-December 2.
  - Payne's Farm November 27.

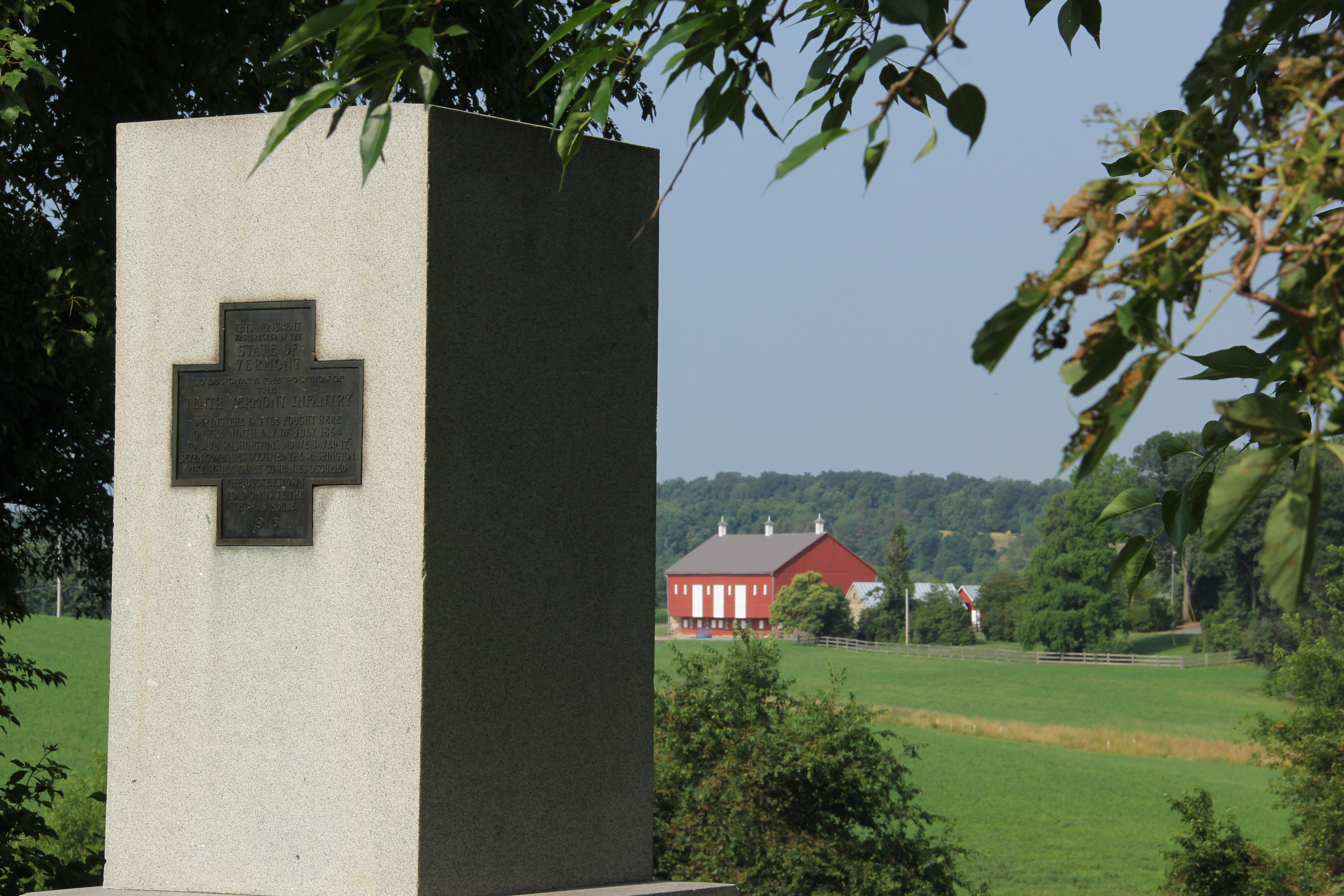
Monument erected by the State of Vermont to designate the position of the Tenth Vermont Infantry during the battle fought here on the ninth day of July 1864.

- 1864
  - Demonstration on the Rapidan February 6–7, 1864.
  - Campaign from the Rapidan to the James May–June.
  - Battles of the Wilderness May 5–7
  - Spottsylvania May 8–12
  - Spottsylvania Court House May 12–21
  - Assault on the Salient, Spottsylvania Court House, May 12
  - North Anna River May 23–26
  - Pamunkey River May 26–28
  - Totopotomoy May 28–31
  - Cold Harbor June 1–12
  - Before Petersburg June 18–19
  - Jerusalem Plank Road June 22–23
  - Siege of Petersburg until July 6
  - Moved to Baltimore, Md., July 6–8
  - Battle of Monocacy July 9
  - Expedition to Snicker's Gap July 14–24
  - Sheridan's Shenandoah Valley Campaign August 6-November 28.
  - Gilbert's Ford, Opequan, September 13.
  - Battle of Opequan, Winchester, September 19.
  - Fisher's Hill September 22.
  - Battle of Cedar Creek October 19.
  - Camp Russell November 10.
  - Duty at Kernstown until December. Moved to Washington, D.C., thence to Petersburg, Va., December 3–6.
  - Siege of Petersburg December 13, 1864, to April 2, 1865.
- 1865
  - Fort Fisher, before Petersburg, March 25, 1865.
  - Appomattox Campaign March 28-April 9.
  - Assault on and capture of Petersburg April 2.
  - Sayler's Creek April 6.
  - Appomattox Court House April 9.
  - Surrender of Lee and his army. March to Danville April 23–27 and duty there until May 16.
  - Moved to Richmond, thence march to Washington May 24-June 3.
  - Corps Review June 8.

== Casualties ==
The regiment lost a total of 352 men during service; 9 officers and 140 enlisted men were killed or mortally wounded and 203 enlisted men died of disease.

== Commanders ==
- Lieutenant Colonel William Y. W. Ripley (declined because of wounds)
- Colonel Albert B. Jewett - resigned April 25, 1864
- Colonel William Wirt Henry - Medal of Honor recipient for action at the October 1864 Battle of Cedar Creek

== Notable members ==
- Lieutenant George Evans Davis, Company D - Medal of Honor recipient for action at the Battle of Monocacy
- Corporal Alexander Scott, Company D - Medal of Honor recipient for action at the Battle of Monocacy
- Captain Hiram R. Steele, Company K - Attorney General of Louisiana and Brooklyn District Attorney
- Sergeant Charles A. Woodruff, Company A - later USMA alumni and Brigadier General, U.S. Army

== See also ==
- List of Vermont Civil War units
- Vermont in the American Civil War
