= Reporter of decisions =

The Reporter of Decisions (sometimes known by other titles, such as Official Reporter or State Reporter) is the official responsible for publishing the decisions of a court. Traditionally, the decisions were published in books known as case reporters or law reports. In recent years, the reporter's duties have been broadened in many jurisdictions to include publication through electronic media.

In the United States, the most prominent Reporter of Decisions is the Reporter of Decisions of the Supreme Court of the United States, an officer of the Supreme Court of the United States, responsible for reporting the decisions of that court in the official report volumes, known as the United States Reports. In contrast, the United States courts of appeals have not historically appointed official reporters of decisions, relying instead on the private company West Publishing to report appellate decisions in its Federal Reporter series.

In many jurisdictions, older collections of case reports are known by the name of the reporter who served during the time when they were collected.
