= Newport Barracks, North Carolina =

Newport Barracks, North Carolina was the name of an American Civil War military outpost. The barracks were located near the small town of Shepherdsville (now Newport, North Carolina). The outpost guarded a railroad trestle bridge of the Atlantic and North Carolina Railroad. This bridge was a critical link in the military supply line between East Coast ports and the city of New Bern, North Carolina The outpost was the site of a fierce battle on February 2, 1864.

The camp was heavily fortified by occupying Union forces based in New Bern following the battle on March 14, 1862, and was guarded by Fort Benjamin, a small earthwork defensive structure with 6- and 12-pound cannon armament. Primary occupants of the site were infantry and artillery units from Massachusetts, Vermont, Connecticut and Rhode Island.

The site was overrun by Confederate forces on February 2, 1864, and briefly held.

As of 2006, no remains are visible and the site is adjacent to a strawberry farm and electrical power substation. A historical marker is located on Old U.S. 70 before the bridge as a traveler enters the town of Newport from the east.
