= Clinton Historical Society =

Clinton Historical Society may refer to:

- Clinton Historical Society (Connecticut), a historical society in Connecticut
- Clinton Historical Society (Clinton, New York)
- Clinton Historical Society (Maine), a historical society in Maine
- Clinton Historical Society (Massachusetts), a historical society in Massachusetts
