= Kirkland Town Library =

Public library in Clinton, New York, USA

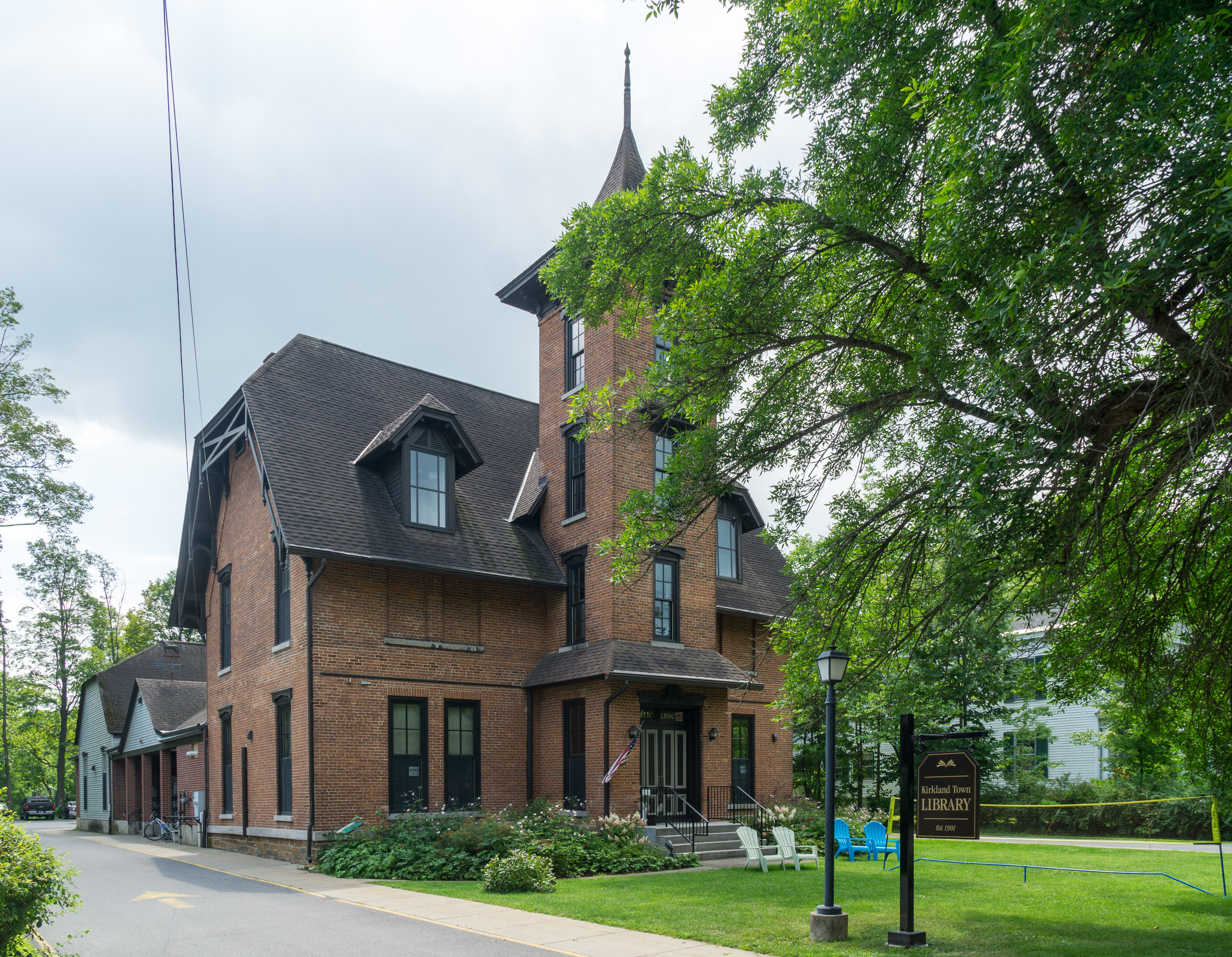
- 43°2′52″N 75°23′3.5″W
- Location: Clinton, Oneida County, New York, US
- Established: 1901

Other information
- Website: www.kirklandtownlibrary.org

The Kirkland Town Library is located at 55 1/2 College St., Clinton, New York. It was founded in 1901, with a modest 1,000 volumes, donated by the closed Houghton Seminary, and occupies what was originally the Sigma Phi fraternity house at Hamilton College. Elihu Root, a Hamilton alumnus and native of Clinton, at the time Secretary of War under President McKinley, was instrumental in helping the library get started.

The Kirkland Art Center (1960–1966) and the Clinton Historical Society (1966–1993) housed their collections on the second floor of the library building, but both have since been relocated to repurposed church buildings on the Clinton Green.

The Library is a member of the Mid-York Library System. In 2013, the library had 71,552 visits, 100,657 circulated items, and 5,500 answered reference questions.
