= Benjamin Woodbridge Dwight =

American minister, educator, scholar and author

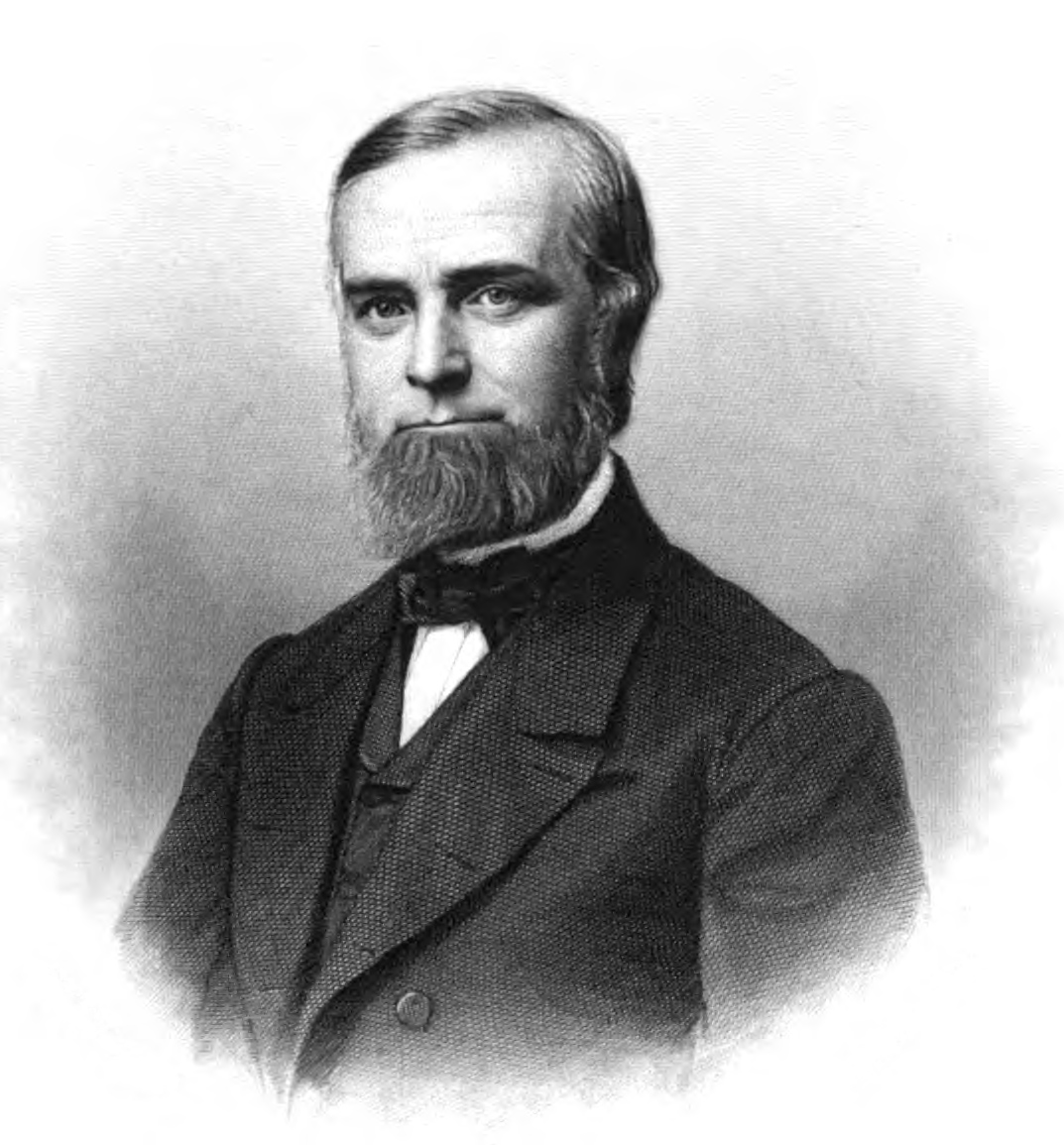
- Born: April 5, 1816; New Haven, Connecticut, U.S.
- Died: September 18, 1889 (aged 73); Clinton, Oneida County, New York, U.S.

Benjamin Woodbridge Dwight (1816–1889) was an American minister, educator, scholar and author.

== Life ==
Benjamin Woodbridge Dwight was born April 5, 1816, in New Haven, Connecticut. His father was physician Benjamin Woolsey Dwight (1780–1850), and paternal grandfather was Yale University president Timothy Dwight. His mother was Sophia Woodbridge Strong (1793–1861). In 1831 the family moved to Clinton, Oneida County, New York, where his father served as treasurer of Hamilton College after giving up his medical business. His uncle Sereno Edwards Dwight became Hamilton College's president in 1833. He graduated from Hamilton College in 1835 and the Yale Theological Seminary in 1838. He returned to Hamilton College to work as a tutor until 1842. He founded the Congregational church at Joliet, Illinois, in 1844 and served as its pastor for two years. After moving to Brooklyn, New York, in 1846, he founded a private high school, which he operated for 12 years. In 1858 he moved back to Clinton and opened Dwight's Rural High School, with Reverend David A. Holbrook and Henry P. Bristol as associates. In 1863 Dwight opened another similar school in New York City on Broadway.

The Clinton school burned down in April 1865. In 1867 Dwight returned to Clinton and devoted his time to writing, including works on education, philology, a short biography of his father and a massive two-volume history of thousands of his cousins and ancestors. He died on September 18, 1889.

Dwight married Jane Dewey on July 29, 1846. She was born April 20, 1823, had four children, and died August 23, 1864. He then married Charlotte Sophia Parish on December 22, 1865. She was born April 29, 1827, and had one child. Children were: Eliza Dewey Dwight born February 21, 1850; Sophia Edwards Dwight born April 8, 1853; Francis Edwin Dwight born December 11, 1856; Issabella Jane Dwight born November 11, 1861; and Bertha Woolsey Dwight born May 13, 1867. His younger brother was lawyer Theodore William Dwight (1822–1892).

His publications included:

- Dwight, Benjamin Woodbridge (1859). The higher Christian education. A.S. Barnes & Burr.
- Dwight, Benjamin Woodbridge (1859). Modern philology: its discoveries, history and influence. A.S. Barnes & Burr.
- Dwight, Benjamin Woodbridge (1862). Reminiscences of the life and character of Benjamin Woolsey Dwight. with Simeon North and E. Y. Swift. J.F. Trow, printer.
- Dwight, Benjamin Woodbridge (1871). The history of the descendants of Elder John Strong, of Northampton, Mass. Vol. 1. J. Munsell.
- Dwight, Benjamin Woodbridge (1871). The history of the descendants of Elder John Strong, of Northampton, Mass. Vol. 2. J. Munsell.
- Dwight, Benjamin Woodbridge (1874). The history of the descendants of John Dwight, of Dedham, Mass. Vol. 1. J. F. Trow & son, printers and bookbinders. ISBN 9781981482658.
- Dwight, Benjamin Woodbridge (1874). The history of the descendants of John Dwight, of Dedham, Mass. Vol. 2. J. F. Trow & son, printers and bookbinders.

He prepared two more that were not published: Woman's Higher Culture and The True Doctrine of Divine Providence.

== See also ==
- New England Dwight family
