= Susan Bennett =

American voice actress (born 1949)

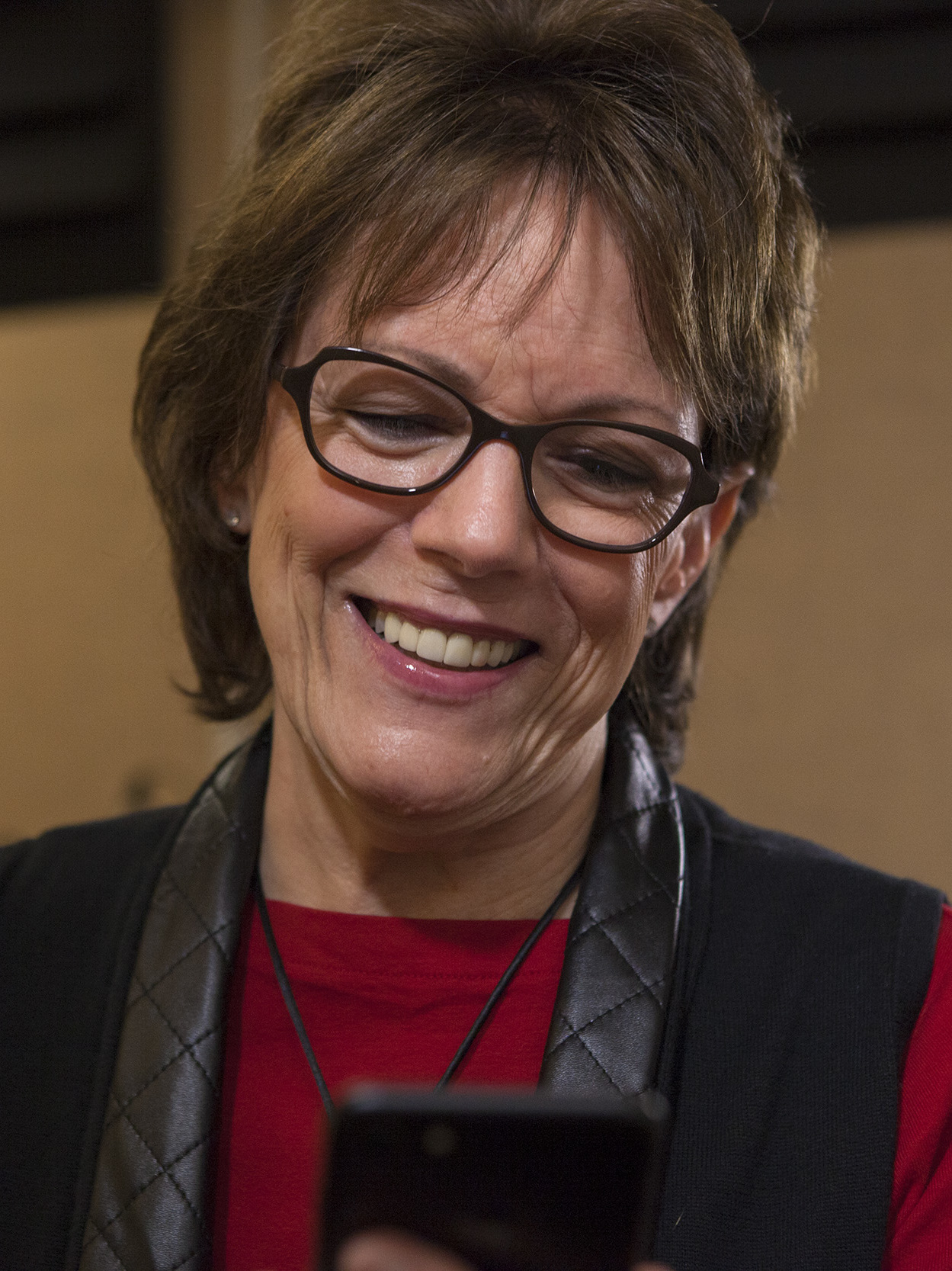
- Bennett from a Voice of America interview, 2018
- Born: Susan Alice Cameron; July 31, 1949 (age 77); Burlington, Vermont, U.S.
- Education: Brown University
- Occupations: Voice actress, singer
- Years active: 1974–present
- Known for: Original US voice of Siri
- Spouse: Rick Hinkle
- Website: susancbennett.com

Susan Alice Bennett (née Cameron; born July 31, 1949) is an American voice actress and a former backup singer for Roy Orbison and Burt Bacharach. She is best known as the female American voice of Apple's Siri personal assistant, since the service was introduced on the iPhone 4S on October 4, 2011. She was the voice of Siri until the iOS 7 update was released on September 18, 2013.

== Early ==
Bennett was born in Burlington, Vermont, and attended high school at Clinton Central School in Clinton, New York. In 1967, she enrolled in Pembroke College and graduated in 1971 from Brown University after the two schools merged. In college, Bennett focused on the classics, intending to be a teacher. She acted in Sock and Buskin theatrical productions, was a member of the jazz band, Conglomerate, and was a singer with the Chattertocks, an a cappella group.

== Career ==
Bennett's career began in 1974 when she was recorded as the voice of First National Bank of Atlanta's Tillie the All-Time Teller. She has recorded messages for the public address system in all Delta Air Lines terminals worldwide, for e-learning software and GPS navigation software, and for telephone systems. Her voice has also been used in numerous local and national television advertisements for companies including Ford, Coca-Cola, Fisher-Price, McDonald's, The Home Depot, Goodyear, Visa, Macy's, Hot Pockets, Club Med, and Cartoon Network. In 2021, she provided the voice of EMMA, an artificial intelligence application, in Persona 5 Strikers by Atlus.

=== Siri ===
In June 2005, the software company ScanSoft was looking for someone to be the voice for a database project involving speech construction. They inquired with GM Voices and selected Bennett, who happened to be present when the scheduled voice-over artist was absent. She worked in a home recording booth in July 2005, more than four hours each day, reading phrases and sentences. The recordings were then concatenated into the various words, sentences, and paragraphs used in the Siri voice. Bennett became aware she was the voice of Siri when a friend emailed her about it in October 2011.

Apple has never acknowledged or confirmed its use of Bennett, but audio-forensics experts hired by CNN expressed 100% certainty that Bennett was the voice of Siri.

== Personal life ==
At Brown University, Bennett met her first husband, professional ice hockey player Curt Bennett. She later married audio engineer and guitarist Rick Hinkle. She now lives in Atlanta, Georgia.

== In popular culture ==
On October 4, 2013, she appeared on CNN "New Day" explaining how she was picked to play the part of Siri.

In the March 13, 2015, episode of Adult Swim's The Jack and Triumph Show, titled "Siri", Bennett appeared as herself and was referred to as the "voice of Siri".

In July 2016, Bennett appeared on comedian Anthony Anderson's ABC game show To Tell the Truth, and was revealed as the voice of Siri.

== See also ==
- Pat Fleet
