= GM Voices =

GM Voices, Inc.
- Type: Private
- Industry: Telecommunications services
- Founded: 1985
- Headquarters: Alpharetta, Georgia
- Website: www.gmvoices.com

GM Voices is a company and recording facility that specializes in voice prompts for IVR and automated phone applications, GPS, and telematics/remote diagnostics. Business presentation narration services are also offered. Currently, GM Voices provides recordings, translation, and language localization services in 100 languages and dialects.

GM Voices records prompt sets (replacement and custom recordings) for open source VoIP software like Asterisk and FreeSWITCH. GM Voices persona Callie is the official voice of FreeSWITCH.

In June 2005, the software company ScanSoft was looking for someone to be the voice for a database project involving speech construction. ScanSoft inquired with GM Voices and hired Susan Bennett. The project recordings would eventually be used as the original voice of Apple's Siri.

On July 1, 2014, GM Voices became the official partner to source professional voice prompts for select Genesys Telecommunications Laboratories services including IVR.

Automated gate agent announcements for Delta Air Lines are prerecorded by GM Voices.

In June 2021, GM Voices was acquired by BLEND.

In November 2025, GM Voices became an independent company once again after they split off from BLEND. The have re-branded their services to include voice offerings in the video game space, creative services, commercial production, and voice for media applications.
