= Clinton Village Historic District (Clinton, New York) =

Historic district in New York, United States

- U.S. National Register of Historic Places
- U.S. Historic district
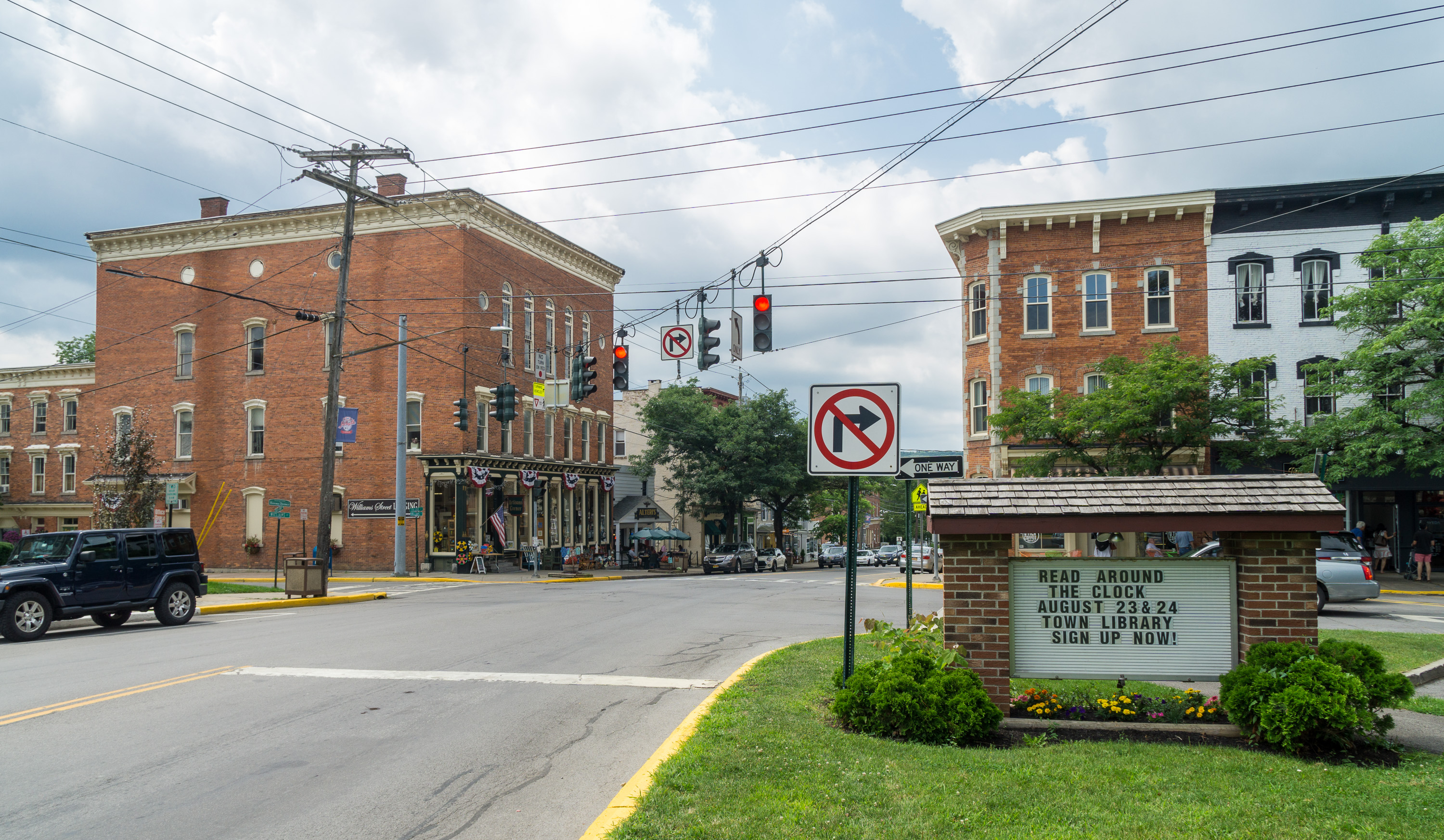

- Location within New York Location within the United States
- Location: North, South, East, West Park Rows, Marvin, Williams, Chestnut, Fountain, College and Utica Sts., Clinton, New York
- Coordinates: 43°2′9″N 75°22′51″W
- Area: 94.5 acres (38.2 ha)
- Built: 1790
- Architect: Multiple
- Architectural style: Greek Revival, Federal
- NRHP reference No.: 82003389
- Added to NRHP: June 14, 1982

Clinton Village Village Historic District is a national historic district located at Clinton in Oneida County, New York. The district includes 144 contributing buildings, two contributing structures, two contributing sites, and six contributing objects.

It includes the Clinton Historical Society, a former church building.

It was listed on the National Register of Historic Places in 1982.
