= Tillie the All-Time Teller =

Discontinued automated teller machine

- A screenshot of an advertisement for Tillie the All-Time Teller
- Type: Automated teller machine
- Inception: 1974
- Manufacturer: First National Bank of Atlanta
- Available: Discontinued

Tillie the All-Time Teller was one of the first ATMs, run by the First National Bank of Atlanta and considered to be one of the most successful ATMs in the banking industry. Tillie the All-Time Teller had a picture of a smiling blonde girl on the front of the machine to suggest it was user-friendly, had an apparent personality, and could greet people by name. Many banks hired women dressed as this person to show their customers how to use Tillie the All-Time Teller.

== History ==
It was introduced by the First National Bank of Atlanta on May 15, 1974. It started out at only eleven locations. They were in commerce starting May 20, 1974. Starting 1977, other banks purchased rights to use Tillie the All-Time Teller as their ATM system. By March 21, 1981, they were available at 70 locations, including on a college campus. On October 15, 2013, Susan Bennett revealed that she played the voice for Tillie the All-Time Teller, noting that she "started [her] life as a machine quite young."

== Appearance ==
Tillie the All-Time Teller machines were red and gold to make them look more attractive. On the bottom left was the place to enter an "access card," which featured a cartoon character. Above that was a place to enter a "secret code" that the customer chose. On the bottom center was a picture of a cartoon blonde girl with china-blue eyes and a red hat. Above that was the place it handed out cash and coins. On the top right was the place to enter a desired amount of money.

== How it worked ==
A diagram showing the steps to using Tillie the All-Time Teller

Customers could use Tillie the All-Time Teller by following these steps:

1. Inserting an "Alltime Tellercard"
2. Following instructions presented on its TV screen
3. Entering a "secret code" and entering a desired amount of money on the "money keyboard" ($200 was the limit)
4. The machine would automatically hand out the desired amount of money.
5. Entering a transaction envelope into the deposit slot

== Advertising ==
There were a variety of advertisements made by the First National Bank of Atlanta in order to promote Tillie the All-Time Teller. These include:

- In one of the advertisements, a blonde woman that wore a red and white polka-dotted dress sang "I'm Tillie the All-Time Teller, I work for First National Bank" while standing beside the machine.
- In another advertisement, a balding, middle-aged man approached the machine singing "If You Knew Tillie" to the tune of "If You Knew Susie." The song went like:

Oh, if you knew Tillie like I know Tillie
Oh, oh, oh, what a girl!
She works to please me, to make life easy
Oh, oh, she makes my banking smooth and breezy
Day or nighttime, I don’t care
When I need money, I know my all-time teller’s there!
If you knew Tillie, like I know Tillie
Oh, oh, oh!

- For Tillie the All-Time Teller's third anniversary, the machine was featured in an advertisement where they sang "She's a Jolly Good Teller." It originally aired on KSEL-TV and KAMC.

== In popular culture ==
The word "Tillie" has become a slang to describe any ATM.
