= Clinton Central School District =

School district in New York, United States

Address
- 75 Chenango Avenue Clinton, Oneida County, New York, 13323; United States
- Coordinates: 43.0499°N 75.3817°W

District information
- Type: Public
- Grades: K–12
- Established: 1955
- Superintendent: Christopher Clancy
- Schools: 3
- NCES District ID: 3607770
- District ID: NY-411101060000

Students and staff
- Students: 1264
- Teachers: 101.5
- Student–teacher ratio: 12.45
- Colors: Maroon, White and Grey

Other information
- Website: www.ccs.edu

The Clinton Central School District is a public school district covering the village of Clinton, Oneida County, New York, United States. It includes most of the town of Kirkland and small parts of adjoining towns. It is made up of three schools: an elementary school covering Kindergarten to 5th grade, a middle school from grades 6 to 8, and a high school from grades 9 to 12. All share the same campus, and the middle school, high school, and district offices are attached.

== History ==
The first public school in Clinton, now apartments on Marvin Street, was constructed in 1892-93. The high school, built to accommodate 600 pupils, cost $42,000.

== Notable alumni ==
- Susan Bennett, singer and voice actress best known as the voice of Siri
