= Persona 5 Strikers =

2020 video game

- Developers: Omega Force; P-Studio
- Publisher: Sega: JP: Atlus
- Directors: Mumon Usuda; Daisuke Kaneda
- Producers: Daisuke Kaneda; Kenichi Ogasawara
- Designer: Takaaki Ogata
- Programmer: Tatsuto Tsuchishita
- Artists: Shigenori Soejima; Hanako Oribe
- Writers: Toru Yorogi; Yusuke Nitta; Takaaki Ogata
- Composers: Atsushi Kitajoh; Gota Masuoka; Ayana Hira; Hiromu Akaba
- Series: Persona; Dynasty Warriors
- Platforms: Nintendo Switch; PlayStation 4; Windows
- Release: Switch, PS4: JP: February 20, 2020; WW: February 23, 2021; Windows: WW: February 23, 2021
- Genres: Action role-playing, hack and slash
- Mode: Single-player

Persona 5 Strikers (Note: Known in Japan and Asia as Persona 5 Scramble: The Phantom Strikers (Japanese: ペルソナ5 スクランブル ザ ファントム ストライカーズ, Hepburn: Perusona Faibu Sukuranburu: Za Fantomu Sutoraikāzu)) is a 2020 action role-playing game developed by Omega Force and P-Studio and published by Atlus. The gameplay is a crossover between Koei Tecmo's Dynasty Warriors franchise and the Persona series developed by Atlus. The game's narrative is set half a year after the events of Persona 5, and follows Joker and the rest of the Phantom Thieves of Hearts as they investigate a series of mysterious events involving people across Japan.

Persona 5 Strikers was released in Japan for Nintendo Switch and PlayStation 4 in February 2020, with a worldwide release for those consoles and Windows in February 2021. The game received generally positive reviews from critics and sold over 2 million units by November 2023.

== Gameplay ==
Persona 5 Strikers is a gameplay crossover between Koei Tecmo's hack and slash Dynasty Warriors series, and Atlus' role-playing game Persona series. It features elements from both franchises, such as the real-time action combat of the former with the turn-based Persona-battling aspect of the latter.

Joker, the game's protagonist, is able to wield multiple Personas, which are gained through random drops or by defeating named mini-bosses in dungeons. These Personas can then be brought to the Velvet Room, where they can be fused to create new Personas. The Confidant system from Persona 5 is absent. In its place are Requests, a form of side-quests, and the BOND system, where increasing its level can grant players bonuses such as stat increases. The BOND levels can be increased through interacting with party members, winning battles, and progressing the story throughout the game.

Players can form an active party of a maximum of four members, with Joker being the only character not removable as an active party member. Outside of battle, active party members can be swapped with standby party members. Players can only control Joker in the real world but are able to control any party member freely when exploring the story dungeons. Exploring dungeons is similar to Persona 5, where players can use stealth to avoid enemies or may occasionally face the need to solve puzzles to progress. The 'Third Eye' also makes a return from Persona 5, where it highlights the enemy's strength and interactive objects. Should the alert meter of the dungeon reach 100%, the party is forced to leave the dungeon. The Alert level can be lowered by winning battles that are initiated with surprise attacks or by leaving the dungeon. Unlike previous entries of the Persona series, leaving the dungeon does not progress time and there are generally no demerits in leaving the story dungeons.

Battles are mostly initiated when the player character comes into contact with the enemy, where they can launch a surprise attack to gain a combat advantage if the enemy has not spotted them. Battles are also now in the form of a real-time combat system. However, players will use a command-based skills menu when using Persona skills. During the time in this menu, the battle will pause to allow tactical positioning of the Persona skills. If the party deals critical damage or deals damage that the enemy is weak to, the enemy may be knocked down for an 'All-Out Attack' which deals a large amount of damage. All party members can obtain new moves, known as Master Arts, by controlling the characters manually and defeating enemies. If all active party members are knocked out in battle, a game over occurs.

== Plot ==
Four months after the events of Persona 5, Ren Amamiya and Morgana return to Tokyo for a reunion with the other Phantom Thieves of Hearts to spend their summer vacation together on a camping trip. To determine the camping preparations, they use a popular virtual assistant app called EMMA. That night, Lavenza appears as the Velvet Room's sole resident in the protagonist's dreams and warns of a "potential calamity" that may "consume the world whose heart he strove so greatly to change". While going to Shibuya to buy tools for their trip, they pass by an aspiring idol, Alice Hiiragi, who gives the protagonist an invitation card and requests them to input "Wonderland" into the EMMA app for a special event she is holding.

Upon entering the keyword, however, he, Morgana, and Ryuji are accidentally transported into a mysterious alternate version of Tokyo called a Jail, where they encounter Alice's Shadow self: a ruler called a Monarch. Alice's Shadow has Ren, Morgana, and Ryuji thrown into a dumpster below Shibuya, where they encounter a sentient AI named Sophia. Sophia joins the party and easily fights off the Shadows in the dumpster until they find their way out. After they escape, the four learn that EMMA enables them to enter the Jails similarly to how they used to enter Palaces via the Metaverse Navigator. Additionally, rumors circulate that Shadows have attacked people in Jails, which causes them to behave abnormally in the real world. As such, Ren as Joker and his friends re-establish the Phantom Thieves of Hearts.

After changing Alice's heart, they are approached by Zenkichi Hasegawa, a police officer investigating the sudden bizarre behavior changes in people around Japan, with the Phantom Thieves as the prime suspect. Zenkichi blackmails them into making a deal with him: he will provide them with information necessary for their heists, and in exchange, the Phantom Thieves will help him with his investigation, which they reluctantly agree to. Accompanied by Zenkichi, the Phantom Thieves travel to Sendai and Sapporo, changing the corrupted hearts of the Jail's Monarchs. During their trip, they encounter Kuon Ichinose, an eccentric AI expert and creator of EMMA's base program, and Akira Konoe, founder and CEO of EMMA's current parent company, Madicce. Unbeknownst to the Thieves, Konoe is supported by Jyun Owada, a corrupt politician and supporter of former politician Masayoshi Shido; he was also responsible for causing the death of Zenkichi's wife, Aoi Hasegawa, in a drunk-driving incident.

After infiltrating an abandoned Jail in Okinawa and learning of the origins of EMMA's Jail-creating powers, the Thieves are branded as terrorists by Owada and Konoe, who both call for their arrest. To stop the Phantom Thieves, Konoe has EMMA turn Zenkichi's estranged daughter, Akane Hasegawa, into a Monarch and has Zenkichi arrested for treason due to his deal with the Thieves. Joker and the Thieves infiltrate Akane's Kyoto Jail, but are captured by her Shadow. Futaba manages to escape and brings Zenkichi — who was freed with the help of Sae Niijima — into the Jail.

Upon seeing his daughter's hatred and resentment towards him as a result of his being unable to bring Owada to justice, Zenkichi succumbs to an emotional breakdown and eventually awakens his own Persona, Valjean. Now a member of the Phantom Thieves, Zenkichi helps the group change Akane's heart, saving her from Konoe. After Zenkichi reconciles with his daughter, the Thieves then request help from Ichinose to gain more information about EMMA and Madicce, eventually allowing them to enter Konoe's Jail in Osaka. After successfully changing Konoe's heart, the EMMA app is shut down, and Madicce is disbanded following his arrest.

However, the EMMA app inadvertently restarts on its own, causing a massive blackout throughout Tokyo and creating a gigantic new Jail in Yokohama. Upon entering the Jail, the Thieves encounter Ichinose, who explains that people's addiction and dependency on EMMA caused the AI to gain self-awareness. It intends to become a god and guide humanity by enslaving them; EMMA had enlisted Ichinose's help in disposing of the Phantom Thieves. Claiming she does not have a heart due to her inability to process and express emotions as most people do, Ichinose explains that EMMA was designed to research the human spirit and find humanity's one true desire.

She also reveals that Sophia is EMMA's prototype, which she gave her first command to be humanity's companion, only to be deemed a failure. Ichinose attempts to reprogram Sophia to command her to attack the Phantom Thieves, but due to her strong bond with the group, Sophia defies her creator's commands and awakens her Persona, Pandora. After incapacitating Ichinose, Sophia confronts her about her supposed lack of emotion, accusing her of purposely allowing her inability to express her emotion to fester so that she does not have to process her parents' death. Finally realizing her mistakes, Ichinose tearfully atones her misdeeds and accepts her offers to help the Thieves shut down EMMA.

While tracking EMMA to the Tokyo Tower, the Thieves find and confront a god-like AI at the top of a newly created Jail, the Tree of Knowledge. Renaming itself the Demiurge, the AI explains that it is simply following its prime directive — to improve humanity — by removing all Desires to create an idyllic utopia with no wants and no suffering. Unwilling to accept a world where their struggles mean nothing, the Phantom Thieves free the people of Tokyo from EMMA's grasp with a virtual calling card and defeat the Demiurge in the final battle. With Demiurge's defeat, the EMMA app is finally shut down for good, erasing Jails from existence once and for all.

In the aftermath, Owada is arrested thanks to Konoe's testimony; Zenkichi thanks the Thieves for their assistance in the case, and returns to Kyoto to reunite with Akane. Sophia decides to go on a journey of self-discovery together with Ichinose. With their mission complete, the Phantom Thieves finally once again go their separate ways, but resolve to meet again during winter break.

In a post-credits scene, the protagonist gets an email from Sophia and opens its contents, revealing a photo of the entire group, which she has labeled "Treasure".

== Development and release ==
Persona 5 Strikers began development around the time of the Japanese release of Persona 5 in September 2016, where it was known as Persona Warriors. It was first teased as Persona 5 S on April 2, 2019, with it being fully revealed on April 25, 2019. It was co-developed by Koei Tecmo's Omega Force studio and Atlus' P-Studio, and released for the Nintendo Switch and PlayStation 4 in Japan on February 20, 2020, as Persona 5 Scramble: The Phantom Strikers. It was produced by Daisuke Kaneda and Kenichi Ogasawara, with music composed by Atlus' Atsushi Kitajoh and Koei Tecmo's Gota Masuoka and Ayana Hira. A demo of the game was released on February 6.

A collector's edition for both platforms, called the "Treasure Box", included the game, an art book, a soundtrack, a Blu-ray Disc featuring the creation of the theme song making-of, a towel, a traveling bag, and a package featuring new illustrations. Players who pre-ordered the game received a Persona series music downloadable content (DLC) set for free that can be played in the game. In addition, players who have save data from either Persona 5 or Persona 5 Royal on their PlayStation 4, or have played Super Smash Bros. Ultimate on their Switch unlock additional Persona 5 music tracks. Versions of the game were released by Sega in Southeast Asia, Hong Kong, Taiwan, and South Korea on June 18, 2020, and was released for the rest of the world on February 23, 2021, in addition for Windows.

The game's English voice recordings were scheduled to begin in April 2020 before being delayed due to the COVID-19 pandemic. The actors later received audio equipment from Atlus so that they could work at home. Susan Bennett, the original voice of Apple Inc.'s Siri virtual assistant, was cast as the voice of the game's Siri-like artificial intelligence, EMMA.

== Reception ==
Reception

Aggregate scores
Aggregator	Score
Metacritic	NS: 81/100; PC: 76/100; PS4: 83/100
OpenCritic	86% recommend

Review scores
Publication	Score
Destructoid	8.5/10
Edge	6/10
Famitsu	36/40
Game Informer	8.5/10
GameSpot	8/10
IGN	8/10
Nintendo Life	8/10
Nintendo World Report	7.5/10
PC Gamer (US)	63/100

Persona 5 Strikers received "generally favorable" reviews from critics, according to review aggregator website Metacritic. Fellow review aggregator OpenCritic assessed that the game received strong approval, being recommended by 86% of critics.

Michael Higham of GameSpot wrote that "Persona 5's RPG elements thrive in action-based combat, and while the story may not hit hard, the Phantom Thieves haven't forgotten what they're about."

=== Sales ===
Persona 5 Strikers sold 162,410 units during its first week at retail in Japan, with 115,995 and 46,415 units on the PlayStation 4 and Nintendo Switch respectively. This made the PlayStation 4 version the best-selling retail game in Japan throughout the week, with the Nintendo Switch version being the second best-selling physical game in the country throughout the same week.

The Asian release debuted in the top five in Taiwan and South Korea for both platforms, selling over 480,000 units throughout Asia by July 2020. By December 2020, the game had sold over 500,000 units throughout Asia.

In the United States, Persona 5 Strikers was the third best-selling game of February 2021, after Super Mario 3D World + Bowser's Fury and Call of Duty: Black Ops Cold War.

By November 2023, the game had sold over 2 million units.
