= Clinton, Oneida County, New York =

Clinton, New York
- Village
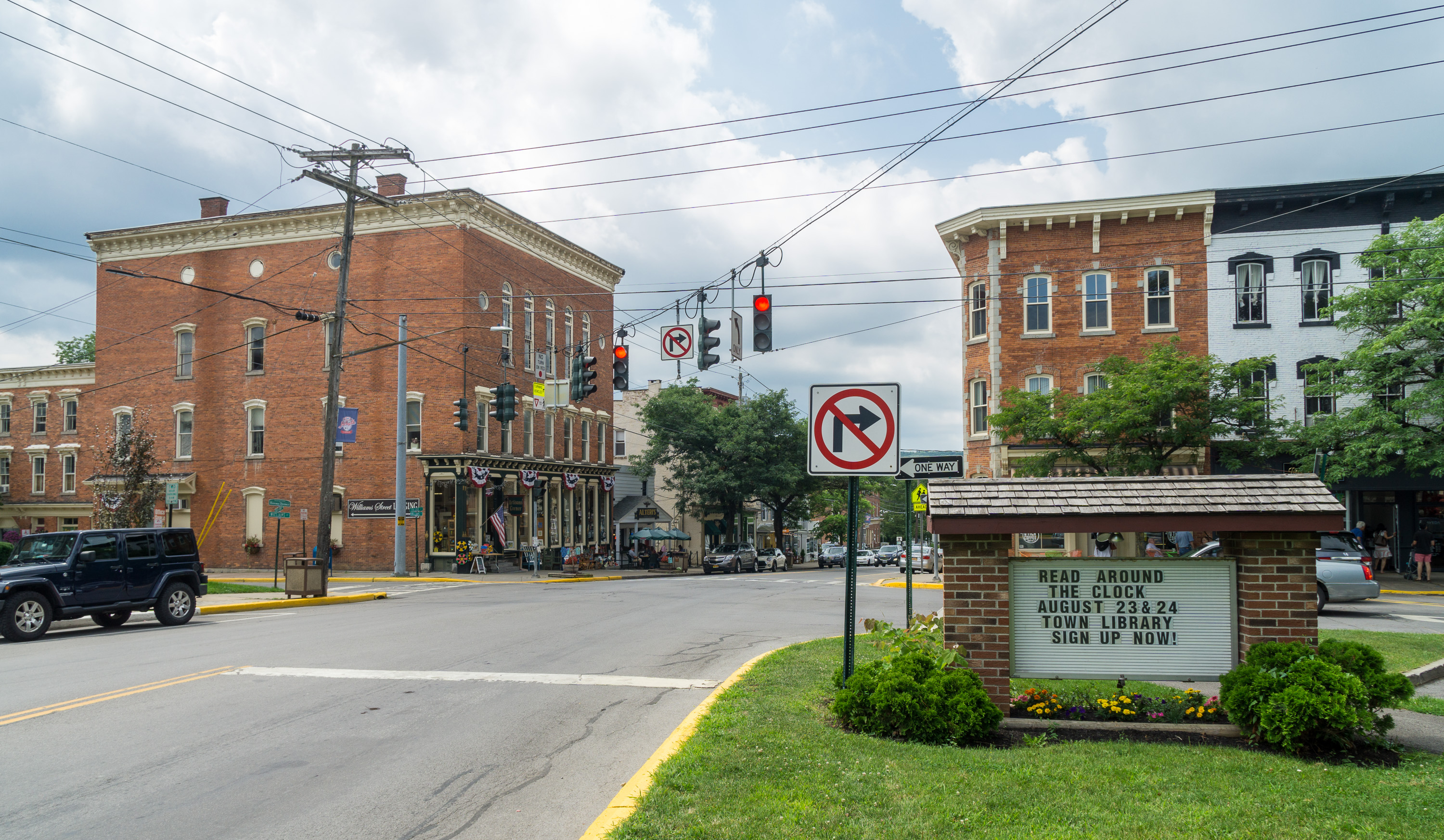
- Center of Clinton, and starting point for street numbers, at College Street and West Park Row

- Location in Oneida County and the state of New York
- Coordinates: 43°2′56″N 75°22′49″W
- Country: United States
- State: New York
- County: Oneida

Area
  - Total: 0.63 sq mi (1.62 km^{2})
  - Land: 0.63 sq mi (1.62 km^{2})
  - Water: 0 sq mi (0.00 km^{2})
- Elevation: 604 ft (184 m)

Population (2020)
  - Total: 1,684
  - Density: 2,689.1/sq mi (1,038.27/km^{2})
- Time zone: UTC-5 (Eastern (EST))
  - Summer (DST): UTC-4 (EDT)
- ZIP code: 13323
- Area code: 315
- FIPS code: 36-16419
- GNIS feature ID: 0946885
- Website: Village website

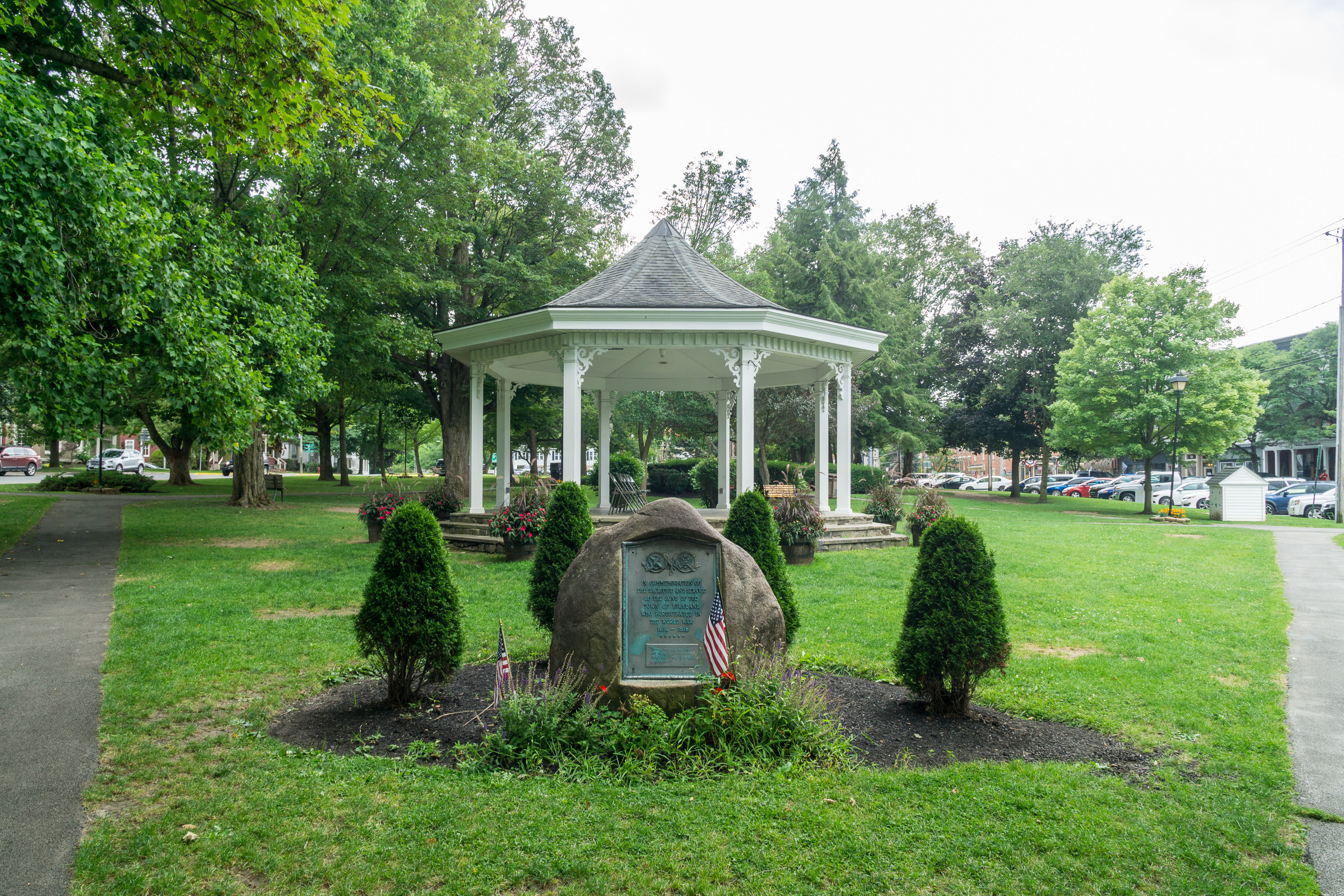
Gazebo in the Clinton Village green

Clinton (or Ka-dah-wis-dag, "white field" in Seneca language) is a village in Oneida County, New York, United States. The population was 1,942 at the 2010 census, declining to 1,684 in the 2020 census, 13% decline). It was named for George Clinton, the first Governor of New York.

Hamilton College and the former Kirkland College are in proximity to the village.

In describing the attractions of Hamilton College in 1833, it was stated to be "situated in one of the most healthful, delightful, and fertile parts of our country; surrounded by a numerous, increasing, virtuous, and enterprising population." In 1903, another school catalogue, besides "the unrivalled beauty of the surrounding scenery" and "the remarkable healthfulness of the vicinity," commented on "the high moral fiber of the community and its superior educational advantages", all of which made Clinton "a most highly favored place for mental and moral culture."

== History ==
1885 lithograph of Clinton with sights identified drawn by L.R. Burleigh

Part of Coxe's Patent, 6th division, Clinton began in March 1787 when Revolutionary War veterans from Plymouth, Connecticut, settled in Clinton. Pioneer Moses Foote brought seven other families with him to the area. The new inhabitants found good soil, plentiful forests, and friendly ((friendly what?)) in southern Kirkland along with Oneida people, who passed through on trail. Named after New York's first governor, George Clinton, fourth Vice President of the United States and an uncle of Erie Canal builder and New York governor DeWitt Clinton, the village had a gristmill on the Oriskany Creek on College Street the first year and slowly developed as a farming and mercantile center.

In 1793, Presbyterian minister Rev. Samuel Kirkland founded Hamilton-Oneida Academy as a seminary to serve as part of his missionary work with the Oneida tribe. The seminary admitted both white and Oneida boys, although no Oneida boys lasted more than one year. Kirkland named it in honor of Treasury Secretary Alexander Hamilton, who was a member of the first Board of Trustees of the Hamilton-Oneida Academy. The Academy became Hamilton College in 1812, making it the third oldest college in New York, after Columbia and Union, after it expanded to a four-year college curriculum.

Originally in the Town of Whitestown and then the Town of Paris, Clinton became part of the newly formed Town of Kirkland in 1827, and became an incorporated village in April 1843 with its own board of trustees, officials, employees, and status as a taxing jurisdiction.

According to Gordon's 1836 Gazetteer, Clinton had 50 dwellings, six stores, four taverns, two clothing works, a worsted factory, a grist mill, three churches (Universalist, Baptist, and Congregational), two academies, and two seminaries.

Elihu Root, Secretary of State under President McKinley and Secretary of War under presidents McKinley and Roosevelt, was born in a building on the Hamilton College campus, and is probably Clinton's most famous son.

Although never a factory town, Clinton did have the Clinton Knitting Company on the site of the Clinton House Apartments on Kirkland Avenue in the first half of the 20th century, as well as the Clinton Canning Company to process local vegetables in the late summer and fall.

The pharmaceutical company Bristol-Myers Squibb began as the Clinton Pharmaceutical Company in 1887 on the second floor of 3-5 West Park Row and moved to Syracuse after three years. Both founders, William Bristol and John Myers, graduated from Hamilton College.

== Attractions ==
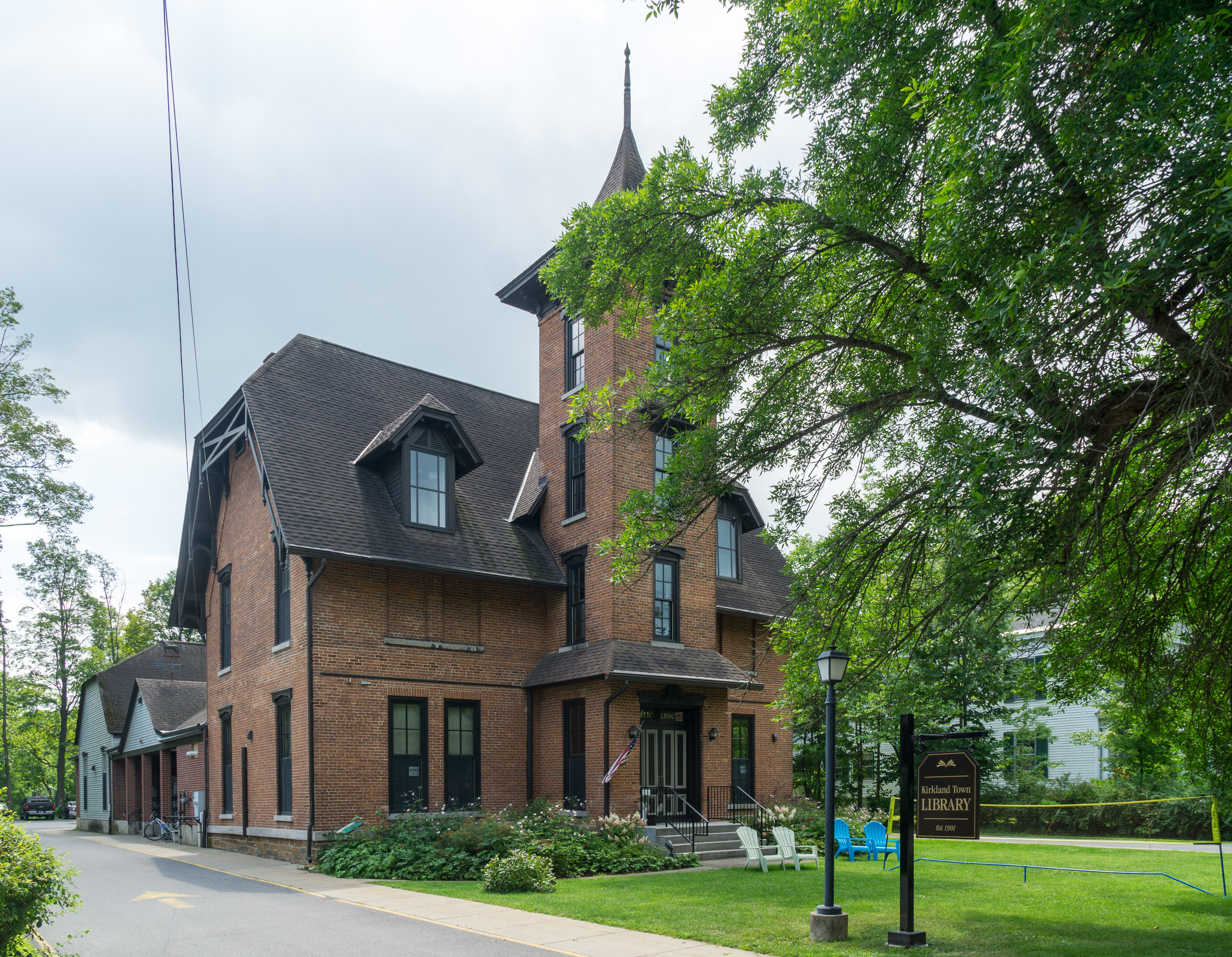
Kirkland Town Library in Clinton

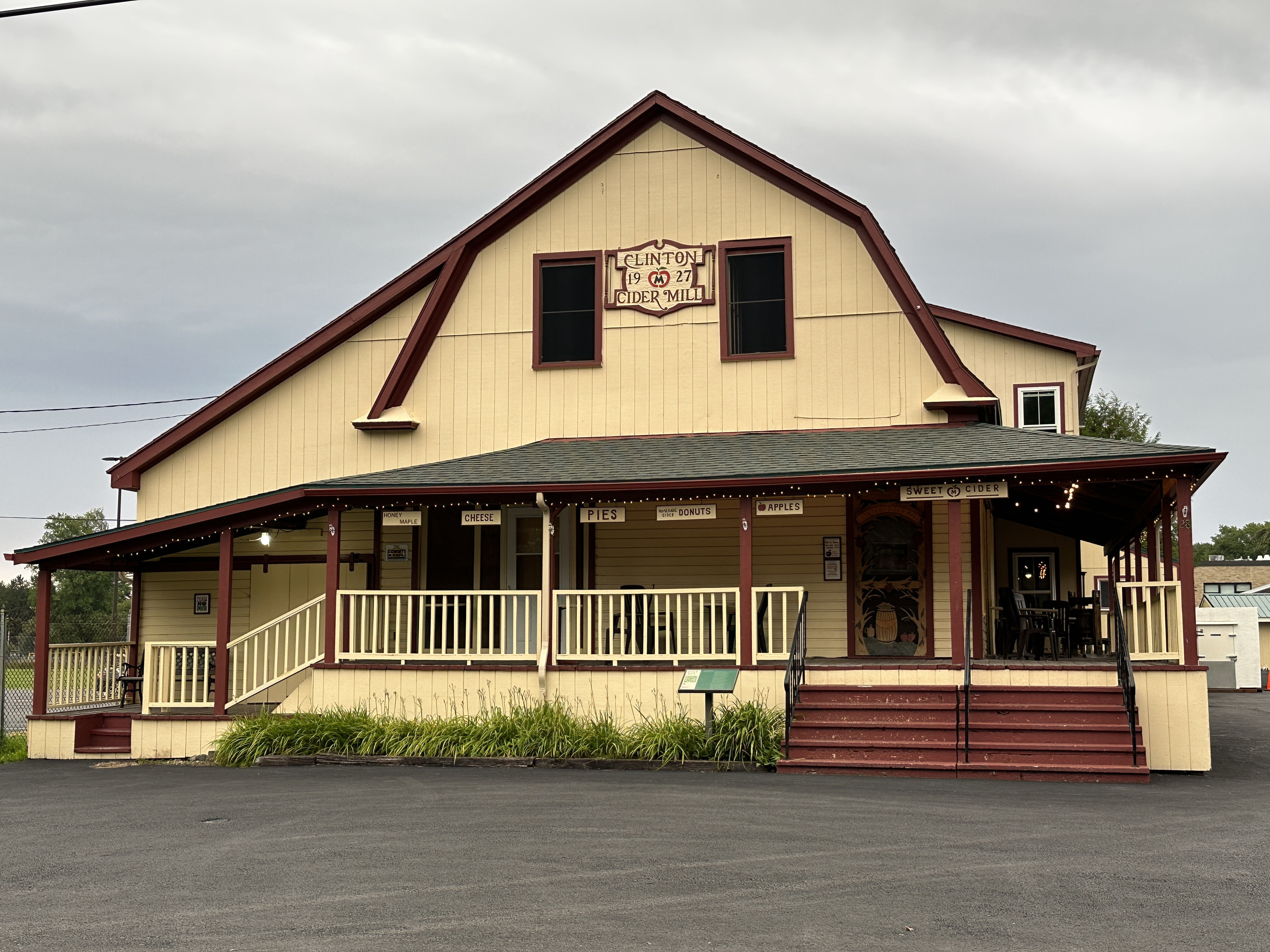
Clinton Cider Mill, a local institution

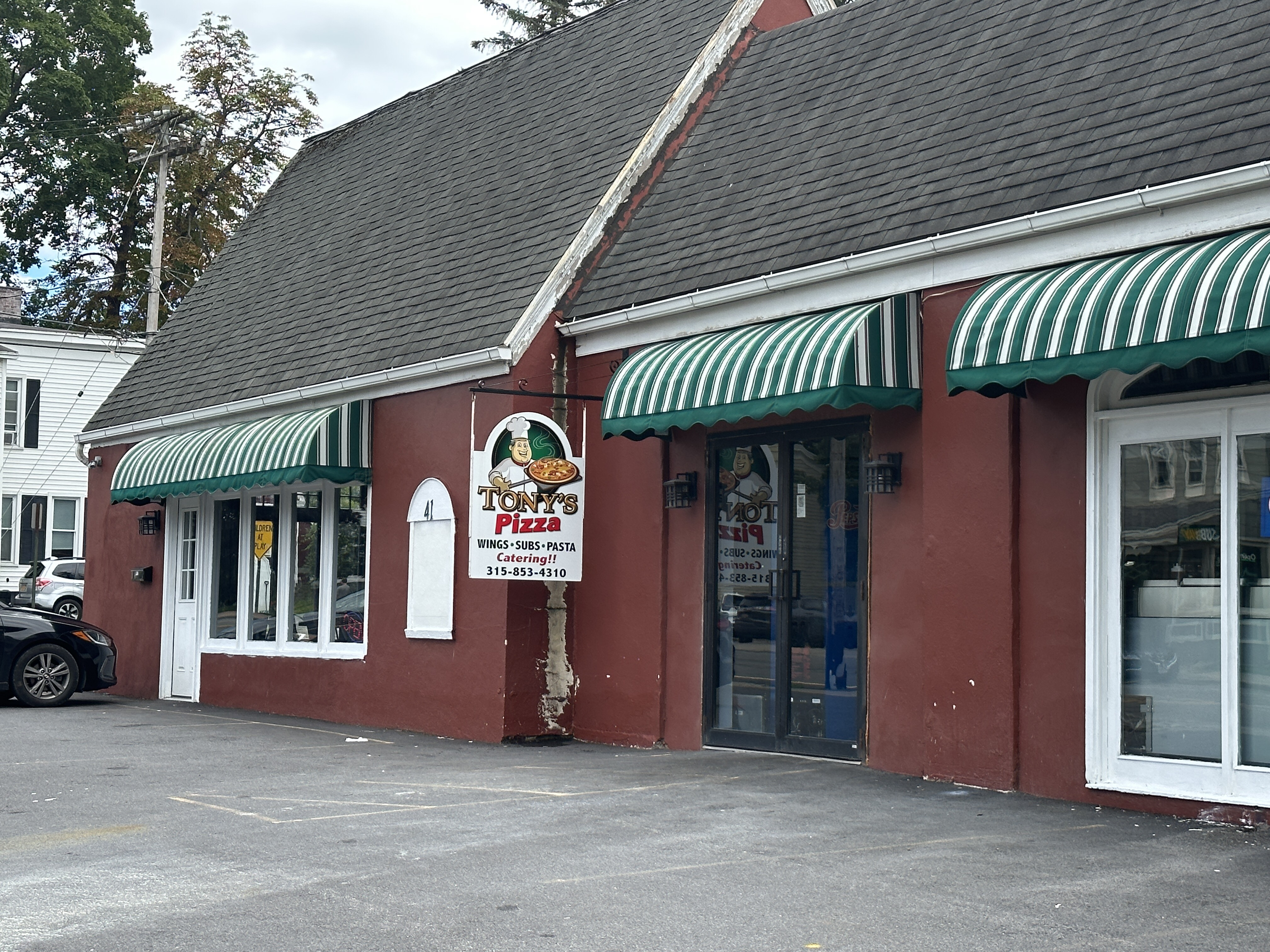
Tony's, a restaurant in Clinton

The village centers around the Village Green, a park where many community events take place. Annual events on and around the Village Green include a summer farmers market, the Shopper's Stroll during the weekend after Thanksgiving, and the Clinton Art and Music festival in August. The Kirkland Art Center also hosts many activities throughout the year, including the KAC Road Race. The historic Clinton Cider Mill, a local favorite on Elm Street, has been producing cider since the early 1900s and is open seasonally from Labor Day through Thanksgiving.

The Clinton Historic District is listed on the National Register of Historic Places. There is also an active Clinton Historical Society.

== Education ==
The Clinton Central School District covers Clinton and most of the surrounding Town of Kirkland. Its campus is near the center of Clinton.

Hamilton College is near the village, in the Town of Kirkland.

=== History of education ===
In the 19th century, Clinton was known as a "village of schools" and was sometimes called "Schooltown" and described as "an Academic village." The prosperity and reputation of the Hamilton-Oneida Academy had drawn public attention to Clinton as a place of education. It had numerous private schools, some day schools and some boarding, some secondary, of which there was no public school until 1891, and some primary. The largest building in town was a school (the Clinton Liberal Institute). A survey lists 37 schools, not counting Hamilton College, that operated in Clinton between 1790 (?) and 1915. A later list has 60, noting that "many...were in...the stately homes throughout the town; A subsequent list located 70. Some of these were small, one-room schools, often short-lived, and not much information survives on them.

Prior to the passage of the New York State Compulsory School Law of 1894, about half of the town's school-age children attended a school.

As put in 1878:

The village of Clinton is remarkable for its healthful attractiveness, and the various educational institutions in and around it have given it a classical [educated] air, and elevated and refined the morals of the community where they are located. Truly, Clinton may be proud of the course she has taken in laying firm foundations for the education of the youth of the land.

There was a public elementary or grammar school on East Park Row, which in 1802 was replaced by a brick building and in 1839 by a larger wood structure.

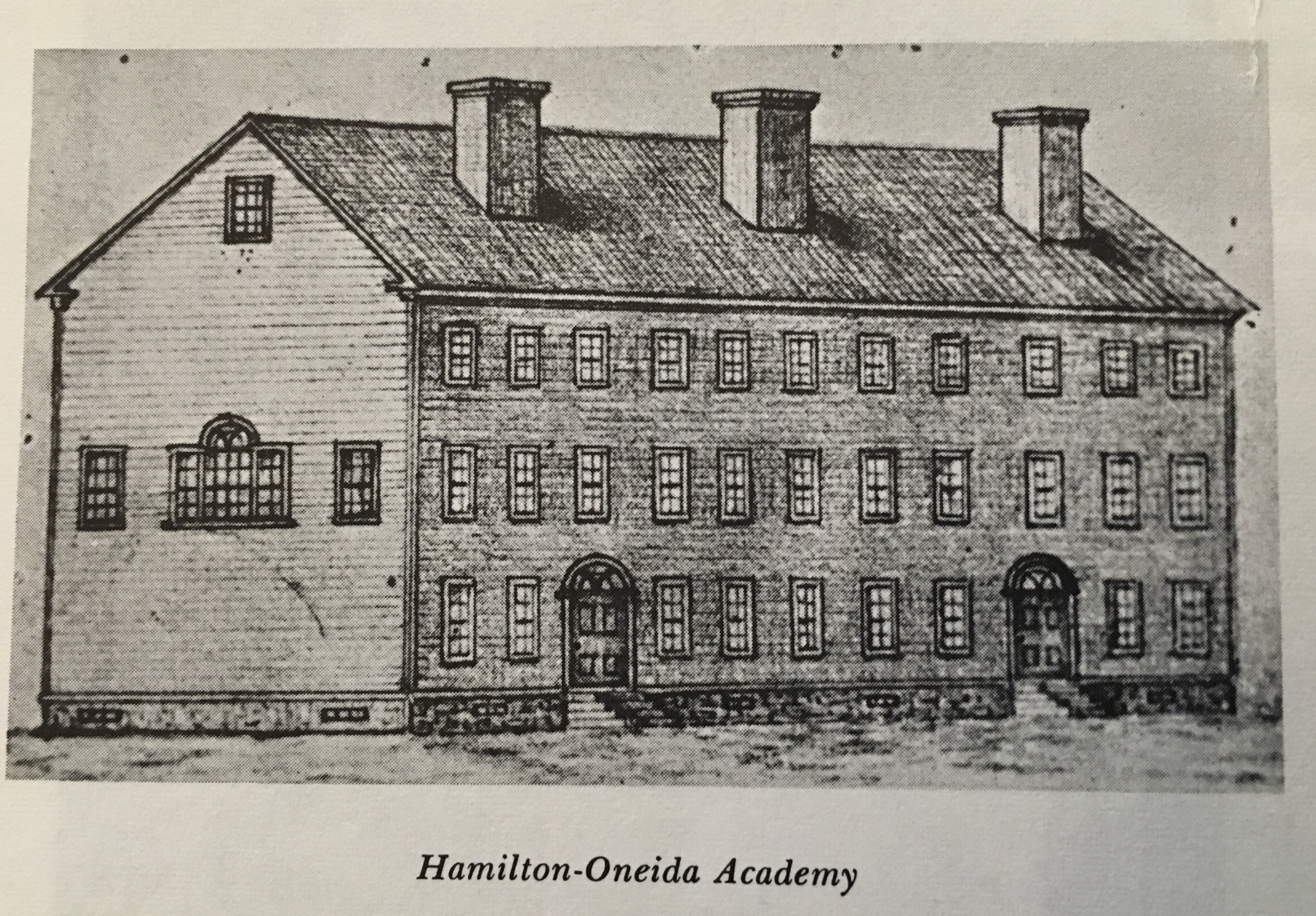
Hamilton-Oneida Academy

From 1793 to 1812 the Hamilton–Oneida Academy, forerunner of Hamilton College (1812), operated in what would later become Clinton. Its three-story building, torn down in 1830 or 1832, became the original building of the college.

Between the closing of the Hamilton-Oneida Academy in 1812 and the opening of the Clinton Grammar School a "classical" (college preparatory) school operated at what is today (2023) the oldest house in Clinton, at 29 West Park Row.

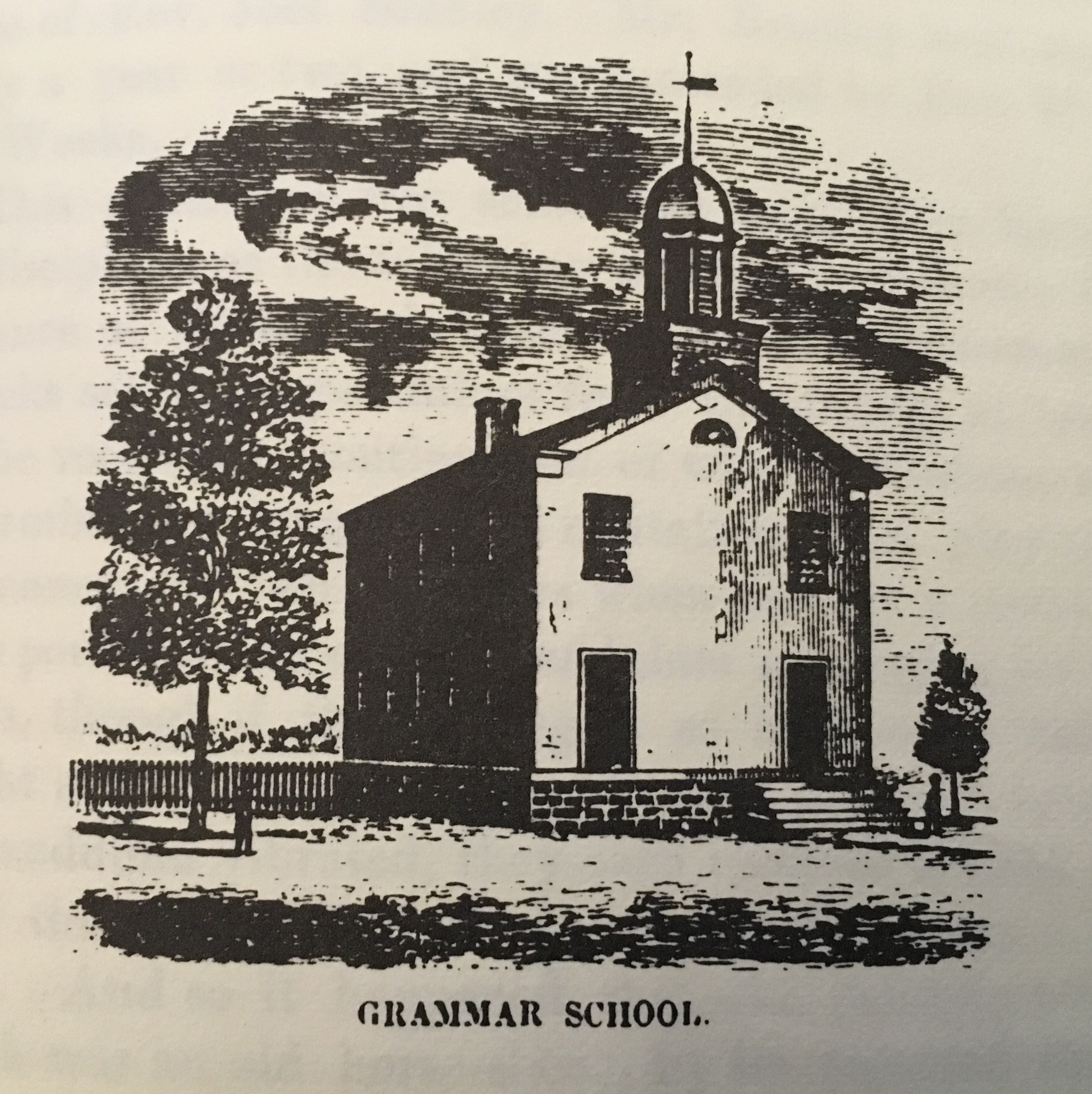
Original building of the Clinton Grammar School; a second building was added later

In 1813 the Clinton Grammar School was founded; it was chartered in 1815. Under four different names, including Rural High School and Clinton Military Academy, it survived until 1892 and was primarily in two buildings at 86–88 College St., though in 1891 it consolidated with Kirkland Hall (see below) and met there. The school was considered a "classical school", meaning it prepared students for college. Sometimes it had a "Female Department" Elihu Root, Mark Hopkins, and Grover Cleveland all studied there. It was torn down in 1900.

From 1814 to 1856 the Royce Academy was a boarding and day school for young ladies. Its last location was the former Royce mansion, at the intersection of Kirkland and Chenango Avenues. It closed upon the death of Miss Nancy Royce, an invalid who was the main instructor. "Two or three Indian girls, of the Stockbridge tribe, were at one time members of this school."

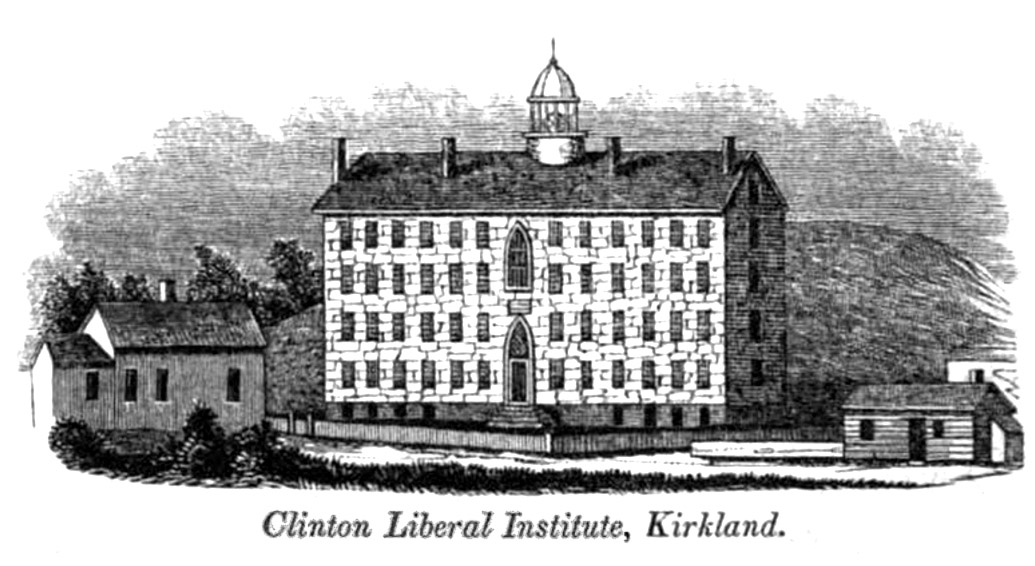
Drawing of the main (male) building of the Clinton Liberal Institute, published in Historical Collections of the State of New York in 1842. At that date Clinton had not yet been incorporated, so it is described as being in the town of Kirkland.

The Clinton Liberal Institute was a coeducational preparatory school founded by the Universalist Church, operating at the corner of Utica and Mulberry Streets from 1831 to 1878, and then in Fort Plain until destroyed by fire in 1900. An advertisement in 1841 reveals that it had a female department, and among the subjects taught were Greek, Hebrew, French, Astronomy, and Moral Philosophy. The Female Department was located at 12 Utica Street until 1851, then moved to 13 Chestnut Street, across from William Street. In this latter location it was also known as the White Seminary. After the Institute moved to Fort Plain, this building housed Kirkland Hall, a school for boys.

In 1833, Rev. Hiram H. Kellogg, a Presbyterian minister, abolitionist, Hamilton College graduate, and good friend of Gerrit Smith, opened in Clinton a Young Ladies' Domestic Seminary, also called the Clinton Female Seminary and the Clinton Seminary, a counterpart to some extent to the all-male Oneida Institute. Like the Institute, it admitted students of all skin colors: three Negro girls. Another gives the number of Negro students as seven. The first was Mary E. Bibb, who became a teacher. Another was Louisa Matilda Jacobs, daughter of author Harriet Jacobs. A native American, Electa Quinney, also studied there, as did Elizabeth Smith Miller, daughter of Gerrit Smith (1835–1836). A manual labor school, it was located at 23 Kellogg Street, on the corner of Mulberry. The students spent "a portion of each day" on "domestic avocations...to prepare them to run a household." This was interrupted in 1841; he became President of Knox College. Over 500 young ladies were educated in the eight years preceding his departure for Knox. The school, an inspiration for the seminary at Monticello, Illinois, the Mount Holyoke Seminary, and the Female Departments of Knox, Oberlin, and Elmira College, reopened less successfully from 1847 to 1850, after which it merged with the Clinton Grammar School. The original building survives.

In 1841, the Free Will Baptists purchased the building previously occupied by Kellogg's Seminary, and established the Clinton Seminary. The Clinton Seminary began publication of a paper called the Clinton Seminary Advocate. When the school enrollment outgrew the building's capacity it removed to the vacant Oneida Institute buildings and became the Whitestown Seminary. The former Kellogg's Seminary buildings were reopened as a private school by Pelatiah Rawson, previously of the Oneida Institute, but Rawson's health led it, within three years, to close (or rather, change ownership and name).

In 1844, the Clinton Grammar School, Clinton Liberal Institute, Clinton Seminary, and Hamilton Academy, all being under the supervision of the New York State Board of Regents which made them eligible, received state appropriations of $48.84, $274.01, $387.95, and $225.18 respectively. No other village in the area had as many recipient institutions, Together with the Oneida Institute, which received $86.82, other Oneida institutions made it the leading county. The Clinton Liberal Institute, along with other military subjects, offered fencing. In 1846, the Clinton Grammar School, Clinton Liberal Institute, and Hamilton Academy received state appropriations of $302.20, $369.35, and $271.67 respectively. In 1847, the Clinton Grammar School, Clinton Liberal Institute, and Clinton Academy received state appropriations ($262.89, $360.05, $45.73 respectively). The Clinton Grammar School received a state appropriation of $25 in 1849, and $105.36 in 1869. In 1873 the Clinton Grammar School and the Clinton Liberal Institute each received $149.23.

In 1849, an advertisement reveals that Miss Catherine Hopkins, for some years Principal of the Female Department of the Hamilton Academy, was running a Young Ladies' Seminary, where Latin, Greek, French, German, and Italian could be studied.

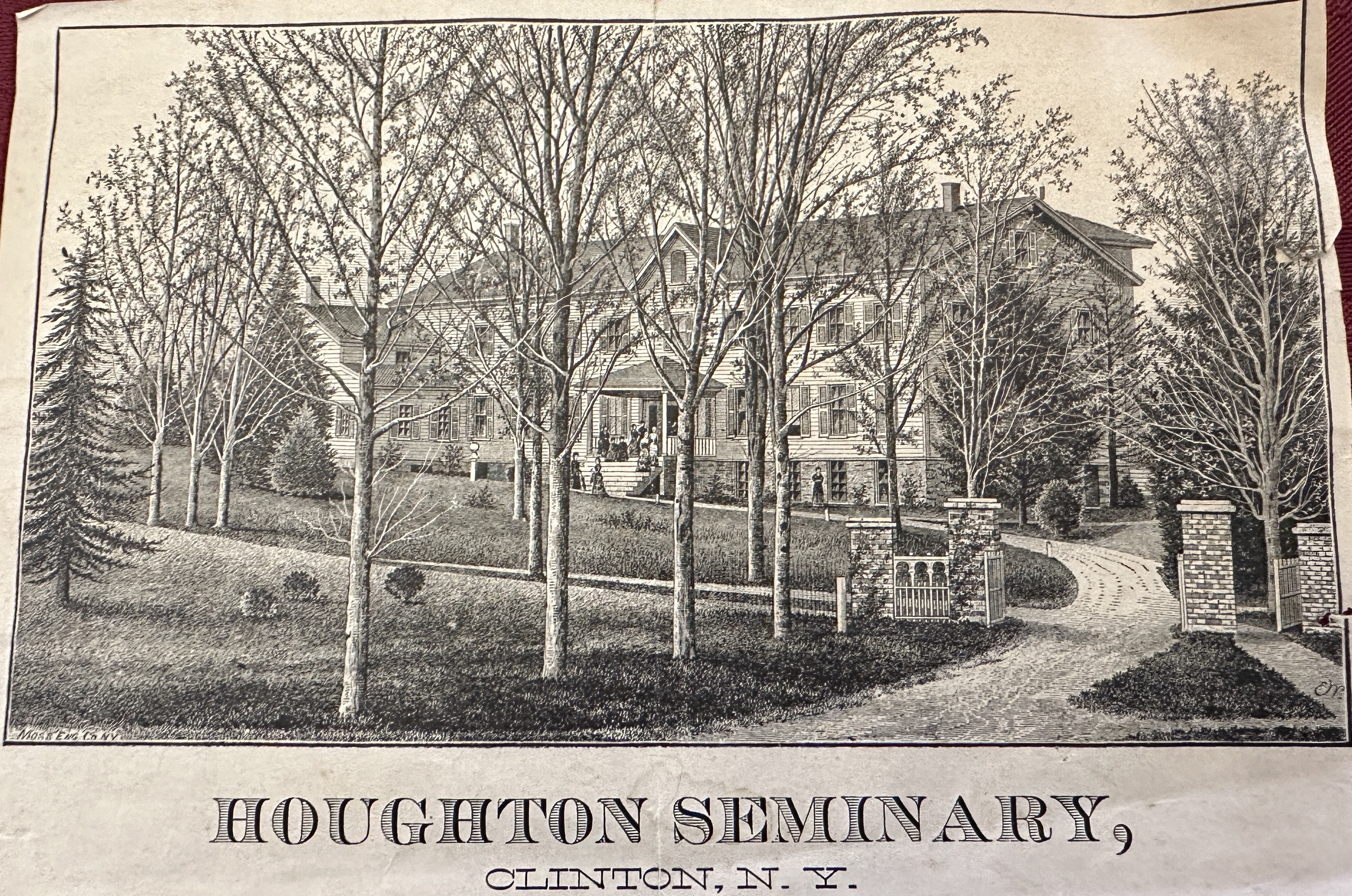
Houghton Seminary

In 1854, a Home Cottage Seminary was founded, at 23 Chestnut St., "at the west end of Chestnut Street," on the corner of Franklin Avenue, by Louisa M. Barker, previously Principal of the Female Department of the Clinton Liberal Institute. In 1861 it changed ownership and its name was changed to the Houghton Seminary (the maiden name of the associate principal and wife of the principal, Dr. John Chester Gallup, replaced in 1880 for health reasons by Prof. and Mrs. A. G. Benedict.). Its grounds occupied 20 acres. In 1874 its enrollment was 90—boys were one quarter of the enrollment—and it was described as "in all respects highly prosperous." It had both an Academic and a Collegiate (college preparatory) Program.Its students were allowed to use the geological and chemical laboratories, the "philosophical [scientific] apparatus," and the library of Hamilton College. Hamilton faculty gave courses of lectures in chemistry, anatomy, and physiology. Grover Cleveland's sister and niece attended. Graduates of the college preparatory course were guaranteed admission, "without examination", to Smith College. Starting about 1882, alumnae published the Houghton Record, 4 numbers per year in 1902. Houghton closed in 1903; Elihu Root was the final graduation speaker. Its books were given to the Kirkland Town Library. The building was torn down in 1912. At the time the name changed in 1861, the original founder, Miss Barker, set up a new, separate Home Seminary, known as the Cottage Seminary, on College Street. In 1878 it had an enrollment of 14 boarders; by 1890 this had risen to twenty. It occupied the same campus as the Clinton Central Middle School, and was said to have the most attractive campus of all of Clinton's schools.

In 1858, a one-man Law School that was operated in Clinton by Theodore Dwight, son of Benjamin Dwight (see below), at Hamilton College was moved to New York City, "where it will be maintained in connection with Columbia College."

In 1860, a "picturesque" Rural High School, occupying 18 acres at Elm St. and Norton Avenue (at the time Factory Street), operated in Clinton. It had a large gymnasium and a bowling alley, and was described by "all who saw it as one of the largest and finest buildings in the county". It operated from 1858 to 1865, when the building burned, after which it moved into the building of the Clinton Grammar School. In 1873 enrollment was about 70. It was operated by Rev. Benjamin W. Dwight, who previously operated it in Brooklyn, N.Y. Maximum enrollment was 80, of whom 53 were boarders. It was for boys only, although towards the end, Dwight also ran Dwight's School for Young Ladies, "an English, French, and German Boarding School." It closed in 1882.

From 1861 to 1896 a Cottage School for girls, later renamed the Cottage Seminary, operated on the west side of current Chenango Avenue, at College Street. It was a combination boarding and day school. In 1898 it was converted into the Clinton Preparatory School, for boys, which operated until 1908.

Additional schools operating at this time included Miss Mary Brown's School on College Street, and Miss Louisa Pond's Select School (1830s–1840s). Miss Katherine Lee conducted in her home a school for young children from 1905 to 1912; another source says it closed in 1906. Mrs. Elizabeth Marr's Select School, established in 1861, located finally at 8 Meadow St., continued late into the 1870s; in 1873 the enrollment was 26. Mrs. Chloe R. Garlinghouse's school on Marvin Street operated from 1876 to 1891. Miss Martha Mears's school on College Street was operated in the 1880s. Miss Anna Sykes conducted her Music School on Dwight Avenue for a number of years from 1872. Rev. Benjamin Dwight opened his home for a girls' school from 1865 to 1889.

In 1882 a school for boys, named Kirkland Hall, opened in the former White Seminary, vacant since the Clinton Liberal Institute moved to Fort Plain. It operated until 1889. It had an affiliated fraternity chapter, Theta Phi. Another source says that in 1886, the Flint Brothers "reopened the Anderson school in the old Institute."

In 1884 a boarding and day school for girls was established, in a new building at the north-east corner of Marvin and Chestnut Streets. It was first named the Florence Seminary, then renamed Huntington Hall. It closed in 1888, the students moving to the Houghton Seminary.

In 1873, there were in Clinton "two Schools for young gentlemen, and three for young ladies". In 1887, there were in Clinton three seminaries for young ladies, two high schools for young men, and one select and two common schools for children. In 1889, it was described as "a village of Grammar [sic] schools and ladies' seminaries."

In 1891, Clinton's public school started to offer classes in grades 1 through 12. 191 pupils enrolled on opening day. In 1893, the opening of the Clinton Union School and Academy, on Marvin Street, ended the need for private secondary schools, although the Clinton Preparatory School, described as "military," occupying the facilities of the former Cottage Seminary on the site of today's (2023) Middle School, lasted from 1873 until 1913. It used the 2nd floor of the Kirkland Town Library as its gymnasium. From 1920 to 1923 the 7th Day Adventist Church operated a boarding school for grades 7–10, called the Eastern New York Academy, on Brimfield Street. Link to 1998 picture of house which housed the Eastern New York Academy

== Sports ==
The Clinton Arena was home to the Clinton Comets of the Eastern Hockey League, which ended play at the arena in 1973. Portions of the movie Slap Shot were filmed at the famed Clinton Arena. The Clinton High School hockey program is widely regarded as one of the best in New York State, despite the small size of the school. The team won back-to-back state championships twice, in 1994–1995 and 1995–1996 and again in 2004–2005 and 2005–2006.

In 2005 and 2006, Clinton's Cross Country team won back-to-back scholar athlete state championships.

In 1984, Clinton's football team went to the Carrier Dome beating V.V.S. in the semi-final, 3-0 and became Section 3 Class B Co-Champion along with Bishop Grimes since the game ended in a tie, 0-0.

Clinton's boys' soccer program won their first Section III title in 2006, and a second in 2011, for the first time advancing to the state semi-finals, as well as an undefeated regular season. It is also noted that they are among the top contenders for the Center-State Conference Championship every year. Clinton track and field is also well known in the area.

== Geography ==
Clinton is located at 43°2′56″N 75°22′49″W (43.048852, -75.380250).

According to the United States Census Bureau, the village has a total area of 0.6 square miles (1.6 km^{2}), all land.

The village is east of the Oriskany Creek.

The village is the location of one of the several "knob and kettle structure" kames located along the Oriskany valley, named The Knob. In 1836 its then owner, William T. Richmond, donated it to the Clinton Liberal Institute. Richmond's intent was that, with the accompaniment of US$800 (equivalent to $23,455 in 2025) worth of equipment donated by a R. W. Haskins of Buffalo, the Institute could build an observatory on the hill, but this plan never came to fruition.

== Demographics ==
Historical population
Census	Pop.	Note	%±
1870	1,640		—
1880	1,236		−24.6%
1890	1,269		2.7%
1900	1,340		5.6%
1910	1,236		−7.8%
1920	1,270		2.8%
1930	1,475		16.1%
1940	1,478		0.2%
1950	1,630		10.3%
1960	1,855		13.8%
1970	2,271		22.4%
1980	2,107		−7.2%
1990	2,238		6.2%
2000	1,952		−12.8%
2010	1,942		−0.5%
2020	1,684		−13.3%
U.S. Decennial Census

As of the census of 2000, there were 1,952 people, 922 households, and 488 families residing in the village. The population density was 3,349.4 inhabitants per square mile (1,293.2/km^{2}). There were 965 housing units at an average density of 1,655.8 per square mile (639.3/km^{2}). The racial makeup of the village was 98.05% White, 0.61% African American, 0.72% Asian, 0.26% from other races, and 0.36% from two or more races. Hispanic or Latino people of any race were 1.33% of the population.

There were 922 households, out of which 25.7% had children under the age of 18 living with them, 43.8% were married couples living together, 6.8% had a female householder with no husband present, and 47.0% were non-families. 41.6% of all households were made up of individuals, and 20.5% had someone living alone who was 65 years of age or older. The average household size was 2.11 and the average family size was 2.94.

In the village, the population was spread out, with 22.7% under the age of 18, 7.4% from 18 to 24, 23.0% from 25 to 44, 27.4% from 45 to 64, and 19.5% who were 65 years of age or older. The median age was 43 years. For every 100 females, there were 88.8 males. For every 100 females age 18 and over, there were 82.8 males.

The median income for a household in the village was $41,958, and the median income for a family was $66,685. Males had a median income of $45,750 versus $31,369 for females. The per capita income for the village was $26,165. About 3.1% of families and 9.7% of the population were below the poverty line, including 4.7% of those under age 18 and 12.2% of those age 65 or over.

== Economy ==
- Indium Corporation (1934), materials refiner, smelter, manufacturer, and supplier

== Notable people ==
- Natalie Babbitt, award-winning children's author, wife of Kirkland College President Samuel Fisher Babbitt
- Clara Barton, founder of American Red Cross, studied at the Clinton Liberal Institute
- Frederick Bee, builder of telegraph over Sierra Nevada mountains and Consul of the Chinese Consulate in San Francisco
- Susan Bennett, voice-over artist best known for being the female American voice of Apple's "Siri"
- William McLaren Bristol, co-founder of Bristol-Meyers Squibb
- Jack Britton, former World Welterweight Champion in boxing known as the "Boxing Marvel"
- Terry Brooks, fantasy author, graduated from Hamilton College
- Grover Cleveland, US President, childhood resident in 1851–52 at 26 Utica Street when his father was a Presbyterian minister working in Clinton for a missionary society. Cleveland's biographers say he attended the Clinton Liberal Institute, but this is not correct; he attended the Clinton Grammar School. His older brother William graduated from Hamilton College, but because of the death of his father, Grover was unable to continue his education; his last formal education was the Clinton Grammar School. The family resided in Clinton for two years. Cleveland attended Clinton's centennial in 1887, the only seated U.S. president to visit Clinton.
- Rose Cleveland, sister of the President, studied at Houghton Academy and taught history and literature there; she also taught more briefly at Hamilton College. She was the nation's first lady for two years; her brother was a bachelor.
- George W. Clinton, son of Governor DeWitt Clinton, graduated from Hamilton College.
- Flick Colby, choreographer
- Rev. Benjamin Woodbridge Dwight, Hamilton College graduate and tutor, founded school in Clinton
- Edward P. Felt, passenger on United Flight 93, died September 11, 2001
- Ulysses S. Grant III, United States Army officer, grandson of President Ulysses S. Grant
- Asa Gray, botanist, studied at the Clinton Grammar School
- Alex Haley, writer
- George Hastings, US Congressman, 1853-1857
- Mark Hopkins, President of Williams College, studied, as a "private pupil", at the Clinton Grammar School He had relatives in the village.
- Louisa Matilda Jacobs, an African American, studied at the Young Ladies' Domestic Seminary
- Rev. Hiram Huntington Kellogg Sr., graduate of Hamilton College, founder of the Young Ladies' Domestic Seminary and first president of Knox College
- Samuel Kirkland, a missionary among the Oneida, obtained a charter for Hamilton College in 1812
- Sarah J. Maas, author of Throne of Glass series of fantasy novels, graduated from Hamilton College
- Louis M. Martin, member New York State Assembly, New York Supreme Court
- Elizabeth Smith Miller, daughter of Gerrit Smith, studied at Young Ladies' Domestic Seminary
- Myrtilla Miner, educator of Blacks, studied at the Young Ladies' Domestic Seminary
- John Ripley Myers, co-founder of Bristol-Meyers Squibb
- Joe Nolan, ice hockey defenceman for the Clinton Comets in the 1950s
- Nick Palmieri, professional ice hockey player, was born in Clinton
- Christian Heinrich Friedrich Peters, Danish-born astronomer, worked at Litchfield Observatory, Hamilton College
- Ezra Pound, poet and intellectual; attended Hamilton College
- Electa Quinney, native American, studied at the Young Ladies' Domestic Seminaary
- Elihu Root, U.S. Senator, Secretary of War, Nobel peace prize, born in Clinton and attended Hamilton College
- Bernie Sanders, taught political science at Hamilton College in 1991; later U.S. Senator from Vermont
- B. F. Skinner, psychologist and social philosopher, graduated from Hamilton College
- Gerrit Smith, valedictorian of the first graduating class at Hamilton College, U.S. congressman 1853-1854, three-time presidential candidate
- Charles Henry Smyth Jr., attended Clinton Grammar School, geology professor at Hamilton College
- Leland Stanford, Governor and Senator of California, founder of Stanford University, studied briefly at the Clinton Liberal Institute
- De Wayne Stebbins, Wisconsin State Senator from 1895 to 1903, was born in Clinton
- Antoinette Sterling, studied music at the White Seminary under Annie Sykes, who had studied at Kellogg's school for young ladies
- Hildegarde Swift, award-winning children's author, was born in Clinton

== Archival material ==
In the William L. Clements Library, University of Michigan, Ann Arbor, Michigan, are the Gridley family papers, [1798]-1885. They contain (212 items) the letters of a highly educated Clinton family, who were drawn to evangelical religion and progressive causes in the 1820-1830s.
