= Hiram Huntington Kellogg Sr. =

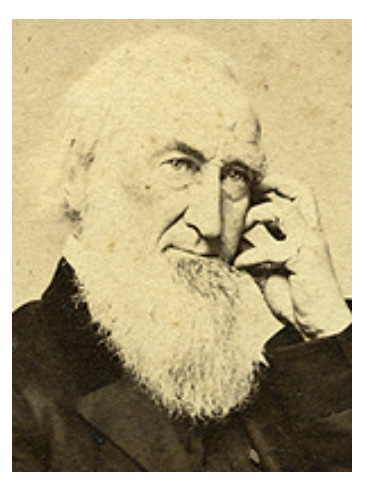
- Born: 1803; Clinton, Oneida County, New York, US
- Died: 1881 (77 or 78); Galesburg, Illinois, US
- Occupations: Educator, minister
- Known for: First President of Knox College.

Rev. Hiram Huntington Kellogg Sr., D.D. (Clinton, Oneida County, New York, 1803 – Galesburg, Illinois, 1881), a Presbyterian minister, was the founder and first director of the Female Seminary in Clinton, New York, and the first president of Knox College (1841–1845), in Galesburg, Illinois.

== Early years ==
Hiram was the son of Aaron Kellogg, who was a member of the Albany militia during the Revolutionary War, and Susan Huntington Kellogg. He married Mary Gleason Chandler, and they had 6 sons and 5 daughters. He received his bachelor's degree from Hamilton College in 1822, where he was a good friend of Gerrit Smith. He graduated from Auburn Theological Seminary in 1826. His Doctor of Divinity degree was honorary.

== Career ==
Kellogg founded and was principal (1833–1839, 1847–1851) of the Female Seminary in Clinton. It was set up in part in response to the success of the nearby, all-male Oneida Institute.

Kellogg was a close friend of George Washington Gale, the founder and first President of the Oneida Institute. When Gale left for Illinois, there to found Galesburg and Knox College, originally a manual labor college, Kellogg went too, and became Knox's first president. A trip to England enabled him to purchase what has been preserved as the Knox Manual Labor College Collection. He also attended the 1843 anti-slavery convention in London. However, Gale and the trustees requested his resignation.

Later in life he was the pastor of the Presbyterian Church in Marshalltown, Iowa (1866–1867), and at the Guthrie and Dexter, Iowa, congregations (1870–1875). He helped organize some Iowa churches and would step in to help others.

Kellogg Street in Galesburg is named for him.
