= Clinton Historical Society (Clinton, New York) =

- U.S. Historic district – Contributing property
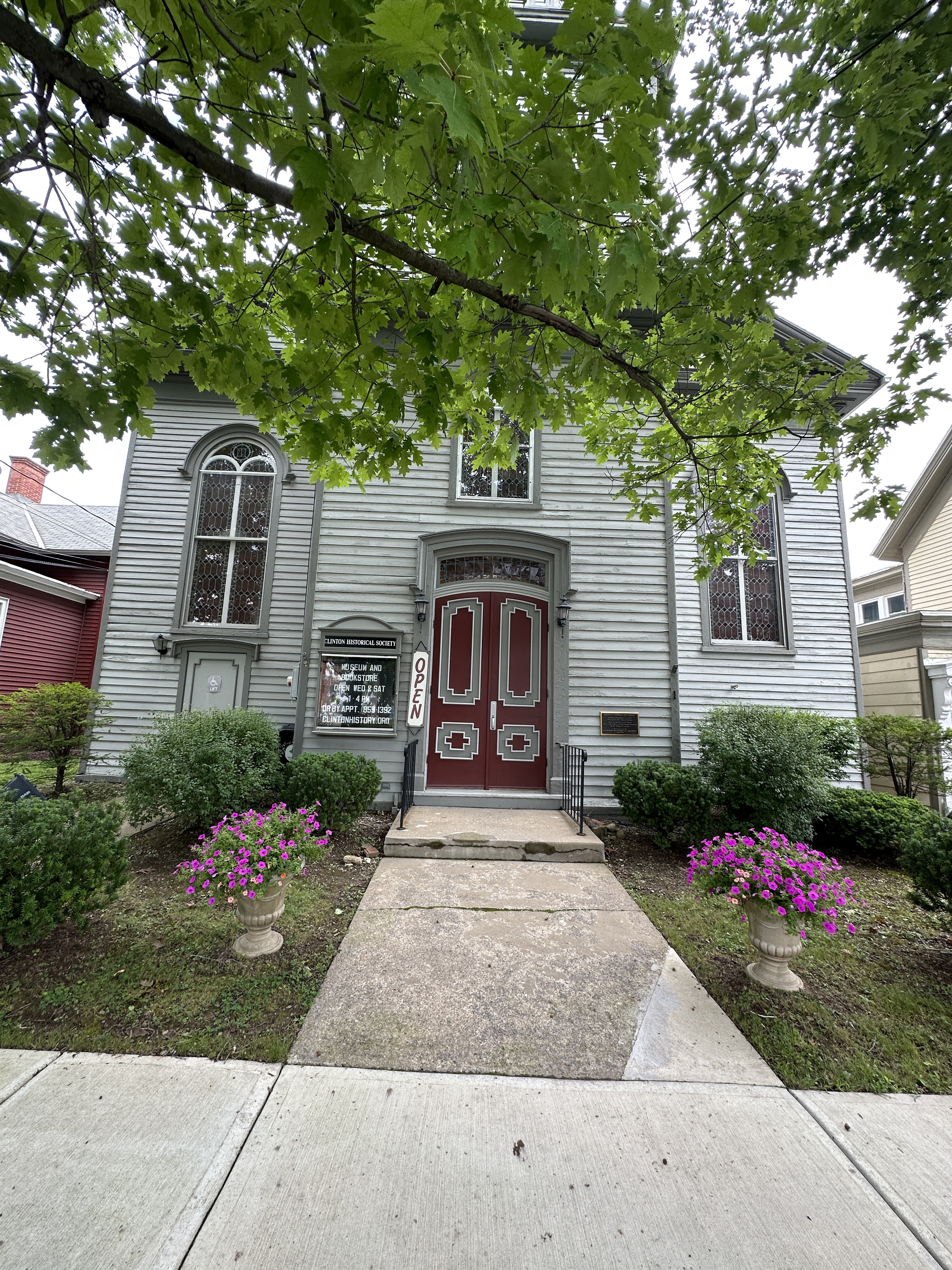
- Clinton Historical Society, in former Baptist church building, Clinton, New York
- Location: Clinton, New York
- Part of: Clinton Village Historic District (Clinton, New York) (ID82003389)
- Designated CP: June 14, 1982

The Clinton Historical Society, in Clinton, Oneida County, New York, is a historical society housed in a historic building. The restored building, built in 1832, is also known as Old Baptist Church of Clinton, and is listed on the National Register of Historic Places.

The historical society focuses on the Village of Clinton and surrounding area. Its name is also used for the historic church building in which the society is headquartered. The building is listed on the National Register as a contributing building in the Clinton Village Historic District. The society's building once had a conical steeple as it appears in a c.1900-1910 photo.

The society is supported by Hamilton College, including the printing of four newsletters per year.

== See also ==
- List of historical societies in New York (state)
