= Park–McCullough Historic House =

Historic house in Vermont, United States

- Park–McCullough Historic Governor's Mansion
- U.S. National Register of Historic Places
- U.S. Historic district – Contributing property
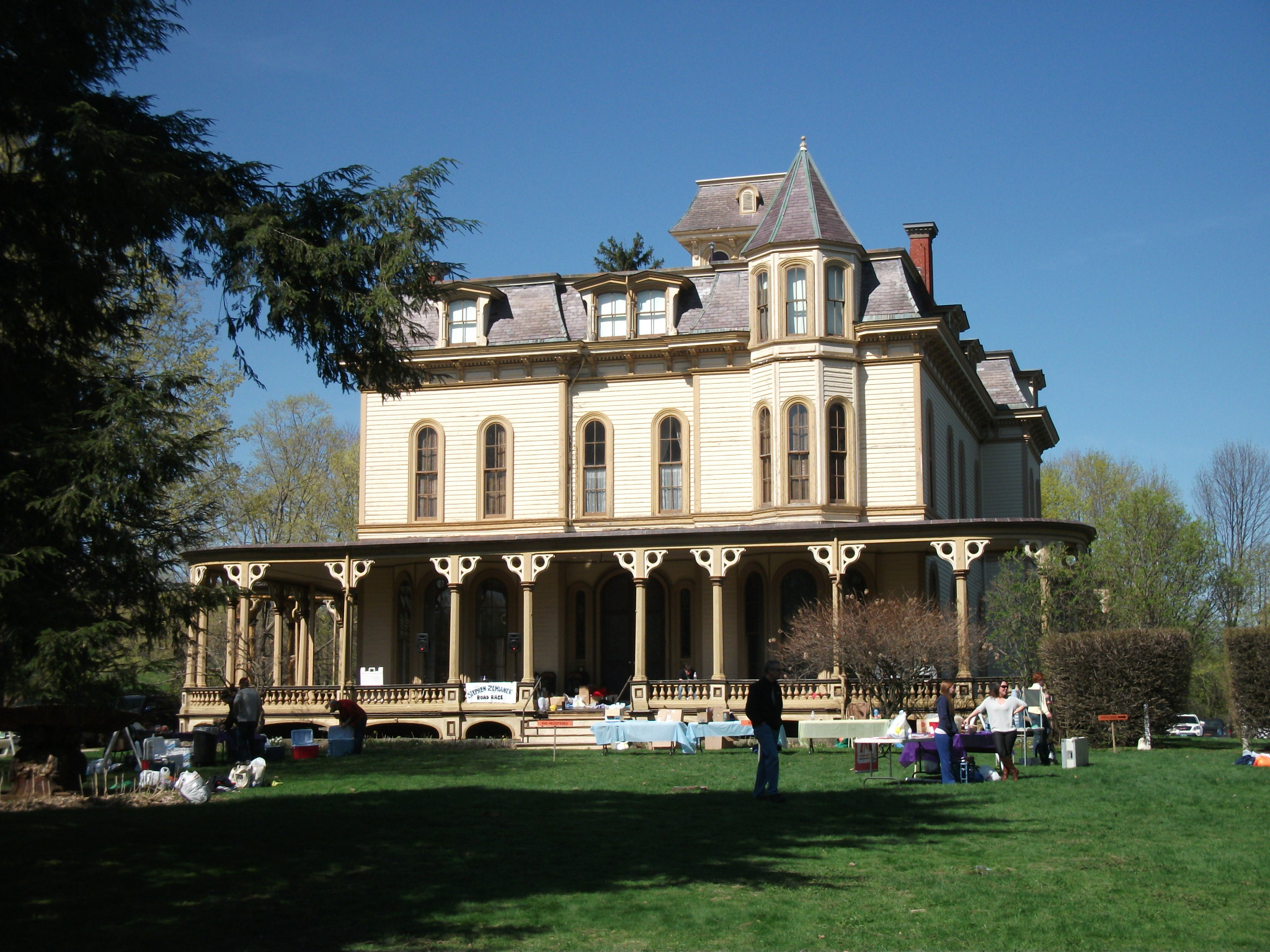

- Location within Vermont Location within the United States
- Location: North Bennington, Vermont
- Coordinates: 42°55′41.89″N 73°14′49.02″W
- Built: 1864
- Architect: Diaper & Dudley
- Architectural style: Late Victorian
- Part of: North Bennington Historic District (ID80000328)
- NRHP reference No.: 72000090

Significant dates
- Added to NRHP: October 26, 1972
- Designated CP: August 29, 1980

The Park–McCullough Historic Governor's Mansion is one of the best-preserved Victorian mansions in New England. It is a thirty-five room mansion, set on 200 acres (80 hectares) of grounds, and located off Vermont Route 67A in North Bennington, Vermont.

The house was built in 1864–65 by attorney and entrepreneur Trenor W. Park (1823–1882), who was born in nearby Woodford, Vermont but amassed his fortune overseeing the mining interests of John C. Fremont in California. It was designed by Henry Dudley, a prolific New York architect of the popular firm of Diaper and Dudley. The house cost $75,000 and the family moved in on Christmas Day, 1865. His descendants made extensive renovations to the house in 1889–90, largely in order to entertain President Benjamin Harrison who had come to town to dedicate the new Bennington Battle Monument.

The Park–McCullough Historic Governor's Mansion is an important example of an American country house in the Second Empire Style. It also incorporates architectural features of the Romantic Revival style popular at the time.

The house is now owned by a non-profit organization and is open to the public.

== Family history ==
=== Trenor William Park ===
Trenor William Park was born outside Bennington, Vermont in Woodford, Vermont on December 8, 1823. His family was not wealthy while he was growing up. By the age of 16, Trenor was already studying law and subsequently, was admitted to the Vermont bar at age 21. He married Vermont Governor Hiland Hall's daughter, Laura V.S. Hall, on December 15, 1846. They had three children together: Eliza “Lizzie” Hall Park (October 17, 1848 – 1938), Laura “Lila” or “Birdie” Hall Park (1858–1939), and Trenor “Train” Luther Park (1861–1907).

Trenor, Laura, and Lizzie traveled to San Francisco in 1852, following Hiland Hall, who had been appointed California Land Commissioner. Trenor joined the law firm of Halleck, Peachy & Billings, but later opened a law firm of his own. He found great success in the West, managing the Mariposa mines for John C. Fremont. The Park (and McCullough) fortunes also encompassed other international ventures, including banking and railroads. At one time Trenor served as president of the Panama Canal Railway, and he founded the First National Bank of North Bennington, Vermont.

The family returned to North Bennington, Vermont in 1863. Construction began on the “Big House,” as it was affectionately called, between 1864 and 1865.

Trenor William Park ran for vice-president of the United States in 1864. On his death left $10,000 to Harvard University.

=== Trenor Luther Park ===
Trenor William Park's son, Trenor "Train" Luther Park (1861–1907), married Julia Hunt Catlin. He was a Harvard graduate and importer of silks. He was a commodore of the New York Yacht club and won the Roosevelt Cup in sailing. He and Julia sailed across the Atlantic 75 times. His mansion, named "Hill Crest", was built in the late 1890s in Purchase, New York, and is now the Old Oaks Country Club.

Trenor and Julia had three children: Julia (died aged 3 days), Elliot Edith (died aged 10, by falling through a plate glass roof in New York City), and Frances. Trenor died in 1907, six months after losing his daughter. After his death, Julia and Frances moved to a house in Paris, France, and bought the Chateau d'Annel in the north. Frances later married surgeon E. Gerald Stanley, whom she met at her mother's chateau during World War I, and they had five children.

During World War I, Julia turned the Chateau d'Annel into a hospital on the front lines. In 1917, she was the first American woman to be awarded the Legion of Honor and the Croix de Guerre in France in honor of her wartime efforts.

Julia went on to marry the governor of New York's nephew, Chauncey Mitchell Depew, then after a divorce, she married General Adolphe Emile Taufflieb. She died, in 1947, at her residence in Cannes, France, "Villa Nevada". Coincidentally, it was the same residence where Queen Victoria's son, Prince Leopold, Duke of Albany, had died in 1884.

=== Eliza Hall Park ===
Trenor William Park's older daughter, Eliza “Lizzie” Hall Park (October 17, 1848 – 1938), married John G. McCullough on August 30, 1871. McCullough was born in 1835 in Newark, Delaware. He began a law practice in Philadelphia, Pennsylvania, and later opened another office in Mariposa County, California. Together, Lizzie and John had four children, Hall Park McCullough (1872–1966), Elizabeth “Bess” McCullough Johnson (1873–1965), Ella Sallie Park McCullough (or Sister Mary Veronica, 1874–1965), and Esther Morgan Park McCullough (1888–1957). He was elected governor of Vermont in 1902.

In 1875, after the death of her mother, Lizzie became the caretaker of the house. Her father died in 1882, and Lizzie bought out the stake her siblings had in the home to become the sole owner along with her husband; she paid Laura and Trenor $23,333 each. After her husband's death in 1915, Lizzie oversaw the house until she died in 1938. Even though her son, Hall Park McCullough, inherited the house, it was her daughter, Elizabeth “Bess” McCullough Johnson, who resided in the house until her death in 1965. None of the remaining descendants resided in the house after Bess's death. John G. McCullough II (Hall Park McCullough's son and Bess's nephew) inherited the house in 1966 and in 1968 offered the property to the Park–McCullough House Association.

== The "Big House" ==
Trenor Park purchased the land the house sits on in North Bennington, Vermont from his father-in-law, Hiland Hall. The “Big House” was under construction from 1864 to 1865, on a property of almost 200 acres (0.81 km^{2}), and was designed by New York architectural firm Diaper and Dudley. The house was built in the Second Empire style. Over time, the total amount of land owned by the family topped 600 acres (2.4 km^{2})! It was originally built as a summer cottage/retreat from their New York home. The family occupied the house most likely from May or June to September or October, and occasionally spent the winter holidays at the house. From 1865 through 1965, the house was occupied by four generations of the Hall, Park, and McCullough families. The Park family moved into the “Big House” on December 25, 1865. As the lady of the house, Laura was responsible for purchasing the furnishings in the house.

The style of the house borrows from many different styles, including Second Empire and Gothic. The house is quite revolutionary for the time because there was indoor plumbing, hot and cold water, and gas lighting. Because of the hazard the gas machine posed, the Park's insurance was cancelled. Only some of the fixtures were converted to electricity around 1910. Most rooms contained fireplaces which provided heat, but if that was not enough, there was a steam boiler, located in the basement, which heated air and rose to the first and second floors.

Diaper and Dudley also designed the Carriage Barn, which was built between 1865 and 1866. It was renovated many years later to make room for automobiles, and included hardwood floors and new partitions. The Park's dog, Abe, occupied the dog house located to the east of the main entrance. It was turned into a play house in its current location, complete with a kitchen (with a wood stove and furniture) and details similar to those in the “Big House”.

What once was part of the apartment occupied by Hiland Hall and his wife is now a sitting room right above the staircase on the second floor. This renovation was made around 1889–1890. This was the first of many renovations made to the home after Lizzie and John became masters of the home. President Benjamin Harrison (1833–1901) stayed at the home in August 1891 for the celebration of the dedication of the Bennington Battle Monument. Lizzie and John introduced the Colonial Revival architecture style to the house in 1889 in preparation for the President, when the renovations were made to the front hall. The main hall is 75 feet (23 m) long, and includes a large fireplace and inglenook bench. The parquet floor, fireplace, and inglenook bench were installed in 1891 prior to the visit from the President. The wallpaper that still covers the walls dates to that renovation. Even though many renovations have taken place over the years that the family occupied the house, the Park–McCullough house is one of the best preserved Victorian mansions in New England. It still largely retains the original design of the house, including original pieces owned and used by the family over one hundred years.

When the family first moved into the house, Lizzie chose for herself the bedroom that would be hers for the entire time she lived in the house. It is located right off the master bedroom that her parents slept in, and when she married John G. McCullough, the couple continued to live in her childhood bedroom. The “Big House” boasts 14 chimneys and 35 rooms – 20 of which are bedrooms. When first built, the house contained 18 coal burning fireplaces, all of which were constructed out of Italian (not Vermont) marble. To keep up with the changing styles of the time, the fireplaces located in the library, main and west halls were converted to wood burning. The house has two entrances, one for those who arrived by carriage (which is located on the South) and one for those that had walked to the house (located on the East). When entering the house from the South, guests are welcomed by a bust of Hiland Hall, placed on the mantle of the fireplace. Rooms on the first floor include the Morning, Library, Music, Dining and Billiard rooms, which all have entrances to the long hallway. The lady of the house used the Morning room to meet with house staff or write letters. The Library is also known as the gentlemen's parlor, which was used as an office by Trenor Park and by John G. McCullough during his tenure as Governor. After the death of John, Lizzie changed the space to another sitting room. The Music room served as a venue for visits from guests, which lasted only 20 minutes. The dining room table is thought to have been used by the McCullough's in their New York home. The room also has a smaller, circular table near the widows used for more informal meals. The billiard room contained many luxurious and high-tech gadgets, including a billiard table which reportedly cost $803 (made around 1875) and an elevator that ran between the first and second floors, which was installed in 1930 by Lizzie. There is only one bedroom on the second floor that did not have access to a bathroom, and as such, a hole was cut in the wall to make a door and provide access to a bathroom on a lower floor. This bedroom was occupied at one time by Esther Morgan Park McCullough, Lizzie's daughter

Part of the west wing of the house was removed around 1940. Rooms that were contained in this section included the original kitchen and sections of the servants’ living area. Over time, the McCullough's changed their gardens (surrounding the grounds) around, and at one point, converted them into a tennis court.

== The Park–McCullough House Association ==
The Park–McCullough House Association, which was offered the house by John G. McCullough II, was formed in 1968. It is a non-profit charitable/membership corporation, which is governed by a Board of Trustees, and requires full and part-time employees and volunteers. The Association sponsors educational programs that are suitable for both adults and children, tours of the home, and hosts many special events at the property. In 1972, the “Big House” was placed on the National Register of Historic Sites. The Association formally received deeds to the property in 1975 and 1984.

== See also ==
- List of botanical gardens in the United States
- National Register of Historic Places listings in Bennington County, Vermont
