= 1861 Connecticut lieutenant gubernatorial election =

- April 3, 1861
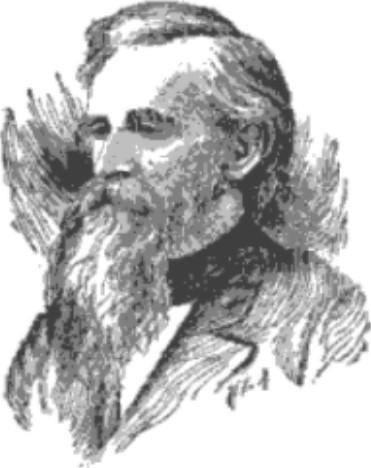

Nominee	Benjamin Douglas	Augustus G. Hazard
Party	Republican	Democratic
Popular vote	42,776	41,119
Percentage	51.00%	49.00%
Lieutenant Governor before election
Julius Catlin
Republican
Elected Lieutenant Governor
Benjamin Douglas
Republican

The 1861 Connecticut lieutenant gubernatorial election was held on April 3, 1861, to elect the lieutenant governor of Connecticut. Republican nominee and former member of the Connecticut Senate Benjamin Douglas won the election against Democratic nominee Augustus G. Hazard.

== General election ==
On election day, April 3, 1861, Republican nominee Benjamin Douglas won the election with 51.00% of the vote, thereby retaining Republican control over the office of lieutenant governor. Douglas was sworn in as the 50th lieutenant governor of Connecticut on May 1, 1861.

=== Results ===
Connecticut lieutenant gubernatorial election, 1861
Party	Candidate	Votes	%
Republican	Benjamin Douglas	42,776	51.00
Democratic	Augustus G. Hazard	41,119	49.00
	Scattering	17	0.00
Total votes		83,952	100.00
Republican hold			
