= Thomas Ridley (disambiguation) =

Thomas Ridley (1799–1879) was a merchant and political figure in Newfoundland.

Thomas Ridley may also refer to:

- Thomas H. Ridley (died 1904), merchant and political figure in Colony of Newfoundland
- Thomas Ridley (cricketer) (1858–1945), English cricketer, barrister and clergyman
- Thomas Ridley (MP), Member of Parliament (MP) for Much Wenlock
- Thomas Ridley (MP died 1629), MP for Chipping Wycombe and Lymington
- Thomas E. Ridley, namesake of Ridleys Ferry, California
