= List of elections in 1858 =

The following elections occurred in the year 1858.

== North America ==
=== Central America ===
- 1858 Salvadoran presidential election

=== United States ===
- California's at-large congressional district
- Lincoln–Douglas debates of 1858
- 1858 New York state election
- 1858 United States elections
- 1858 United States House of Representatives elections
- 1858 United States Senate elections

==== United States Senate ====
- 1858 and 1859 United States Senate elections

==== United States House of Representatives ====
- 1858 United States House of Representatives elections
- 1858 United States House of Representatives election in Florida
- 1852 United States House of Representatives elections in Ohio

==== United States lieutenant gubernatorial ====
- 1858 Connecticut lieutenant gubernatorial election

==== United States gubernatorial ====
- 1858 Connecticut gubernatorial election
- 1858 Delaware gubernatorial election
- 1858 Maine gubernatorial election
- 1858 Massachusetts gubernatorial election
- 1858 Michigan gubernatorial election
- 1858 New Hampshire gubernatorial election
- 1858 New York gubernatorial election
- 1858 North Carolina gubernatorial election
- 1858 Oregon gubernatorial election
- 1858 Rhode Island gubernatorial election
- 1858 South Carolina gubernatorial election
- 1858 Vermont gubernatorial election

==== United States mayoral elections ====
- 1858 Boston mayoral election
- 1858 Chicago mayoral election
- 1858 Manchester, New Hampshire mayoral election
- 1858 Philadelphia mayoral election

== See also ==
- Category:1858 elections
