= Rancho Las Mariposas =

Mexican land grant in California

Coordinates: 37.480°N 119.970°W

Rancho Las Mariposas was a 44,387-acre (179.63 km^{2}) Mexican land grant in Alta California, located in present-day Mariposa County, California.

It was granted in 1844 by Governor Manuel Micheltorena to Juan Bautista Alvarado. The grant takes its name from Mariposa Creek, which was named for the monarch butterflies (butterfly = "mariposas" in Spanish) in the Sierra Nevada foothills.

The grant was west of Yosemite, in the foothills of the western Sierra Nevada. It encompasses the present day town of Mariposa, and the former towns of Agua Fria and Ridleys Ferry on the Merced River.

== History ==
Juan B. Alvarado, a former Mexican governor of Alta California, was awarded the grant in 1844. The ten square league grant was described as being located generally along Mariposa Creek, between the San Joaquin River, Chowchilla River, Merced River, and the Sierra Nevada. This is much bigger area than ten square leagues, and the intent was that Alvarado would select the particular ten square leagues within these boundaries - what has been called a "floating grant". Alvarado never complied with the usual requirements for a grant due to the Miwok Indians being hostile to the invasion of their longstanding homelands.

=== John C. Frémont ===
After playing his part in the Bear Flag Revolt in 1846, John C. Frémont, soldier, explorer, and (later) presidential candidate, decided to settle down in the San Francisco Bay Area. In 1847 he sent $3,000 to the U.S. consul to the Territory of California, Thomas O. Larkin, to buy a ranch near Mission San José. Despite clear instructions, for some reason, Larkin purchased Rancho Las Mariposas in the southern Sierra Nevada foothills from Juan B. Alvarado. To Frémont this was worthless land, over one hundred miles from the nearest settlement, had no farms or ranch lands, and was already inhabited by hostile Indians. Frémont demanded the ranch near the Mission San Jose or his money back. Larkin did not act, and from 1847 to 1848 Frémont was in Washington defending himself at a court-martial.

==== California Gold Rush ====
When Frémont returned to California, he learned of the 1848 gold discovery at Coloma. Shortly thereafter, Frémont also discovered gold in the Mariposa region. With the California Gold Rush, Frémont's unwanted tract of land turned out to be the richest rancho in California. Before Frémont could legally establish his grant boundaries, thousands of miners arrived on the scene. Few of the miners acknowledged Frémont's claim and a legal battle began that would take until 1856 to settle and 1859 to finalize.

Using the vague description of the original Alvarado grant, Frémont "floated" his ten square league rancho from the original claim to cover mineral lands including properties already in the possession of miners. Rancho Las Mariposas took shape along a wide vein that stretched from Mariposa Creek to the Merced River. When the boundaries were surveyed, the grant included Mariposa, Bear Valley, and the Pine Tree and Josephine mine complex. The Pine Tree Mine was discovered in 1849, and it was consolidated with the Josephine Mine in 1859. The ore from the Pine Tree and Josephine mines was crushed at the Benton mill. Frémont also owned and operated the Oso House hotel in Bear Valley. He and his wife Jessie Benton Frémont made their home in Bear Valley until 1859, when they bought a house in San Francisco.

Frémont never worked the mines himself but preferred to lease the mines to different entities. Frémont hired Palmer, Cook & Co., San Francisco bankers, to organize the Mariposa Mining Co. in 1850.

==== Land claims ====
With the cession of California to the United States following the Mexican-American War, the 1848 Treaty of Guadalupe Hidalgo provided that the land grants would be honored. As required by the Land Act of 1851, a claim for Rancho Las Mariposas was filed with the U.S. Board of Land Commissioners in 1852, who confirmed Frémon's title, according to the survey, which he, himself, had made. On appeal to the U. S. District Court, the decision of the Board was reversed and Frémont's lawyers immediately appealed the case to the U.S. Supreme Court. In December 1854, the U. S. Supreme Court remanded his case back to the District Court, declaring the claim valid and ordering an official survey, and the grant was patented to John C. Frémont in 1856.

In 1857, Frémont leased the Mount Ophir section of his grant to Biddle Boggs. However, the Merced Mining Co. occupied the property and operated a gold mine. Merced Mining Co. maintained that the official survey had been made in a clandestine manner and that Frémont had no title to the minerals, as his grant was for grazing and agricultural purposes only. Lengthy litigations in the face of hostile public sentiment piled up court costs and lawyer fees. In 1858, the California Supreme Court ruled in favor of the Merced Mining Co. A rehearing was granted and in 1859 the California Supreme Court reversed itself, and ruled in favor of Biddle Boggs and Frémont. The other claimants lost many valuable holdings. In the summer of 1858 a group of armed men seized the Pine Tree Mine, but after five days of armed confrontation with Frémont's men, they were ordered out by the governor.

After the dissolution of Halleck, Peachy & Billings, Trenor W. Park worked on Frémont's legal and financial problems.

==== Mariposa Company + Frederick Law Olmsted ====
In January 1863, Fremont, then a Major-General in the Union Army, sold Rancho Las Mariposas with its mines and infrastructure to Morris Ketchum, a New York City banker, who formed a public corporation, the Mariposa Company, and sold stock. In 1863, Frederick Law Olmsted, later the renowned American landscape architect, came from New York to Rancho Mariposa as superintendent for the Mariposa Company. Olmsted was not a mining expert. Investments were made in stamp mills, tunnels, shafts, and the other infrastructure related to the mining towns. By 1865, the Mariposa Company was bankrupt, Olmsted returned to New York, and the land and mines were sold at a sheriff's sale.

In 1898, the Mariposa Commercial and Mining Company purchased it for roughly $1.5 million.

== See also ==
- Ranchos of California
- List of ranchos of California
- Mining communities of the California Gold Rush
