= Landing at Kip's Bay =

1776 battle of New York and New Jersey campaign

- Part of the New York and New Jersey campaign
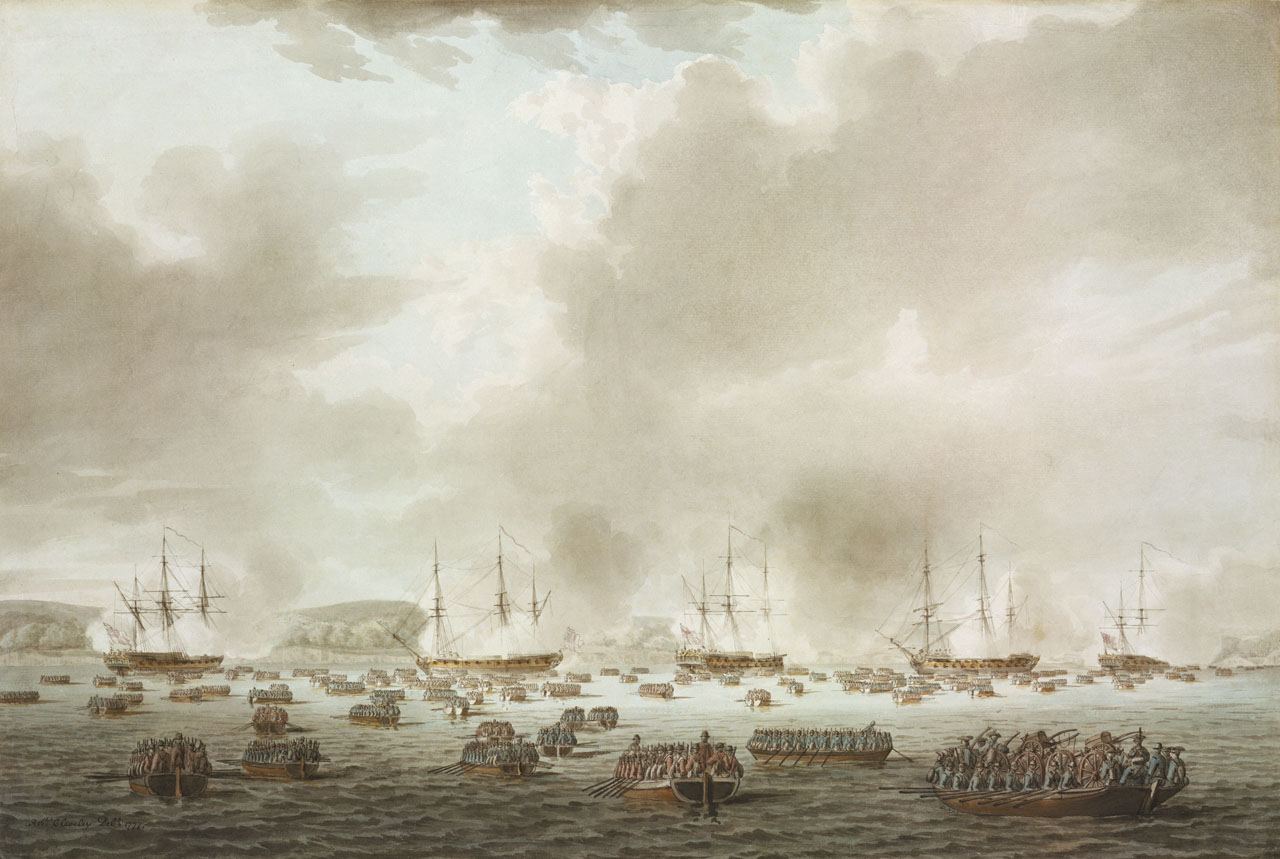
- The British landing at Kip's Bay, New York Island, 15 September 1776; Robert Cleveley, 1777
| Date | September 15, 1776 |
| Location | Kip's Bay, Manhattan, New York 40°44′11″N 73°58′29″W |
| Result | British victory |

Belligerents
| Great Britain; Hesse-Cassel | United States |

Commanders and leaders
| Henry Clinton; Richard Howe | George Washington |

Strength
| 4,000 | 500 |

Casualties and losses
| 12 killed and wounded | 50 killed 320 captured |

The landing at Kip's Bay was a British amphibious landing carried out on September 15, 1776 during the New York and New Jersey campaign of the American Revolutionary War. It occurred on the East River shore of Manhattan north of what then constituted New York City.

Heavy advance fire from British naval forces in the East River caused the inexperienced American militia guarding the landing area to flee, allowing the British to land unopposed at Kip's Bay. Skirmishes in the aftermath of the landing resulted in the British capturing a number of American militiamen. British maneuvers following the landing very nearly cut off the escape route of some Continental Army forces stationed further southeast on the island. The flight of American troops was so rapid that General George Washington, who was attempting to rally them, was left exposed dangerously close to British lines.

The operation was a British success. It forced the Continental Army to withdraw to Harlem Heights, ceding control of New York City on the lower half of the island. However, Washington established strong positions on Harlem Heights, which he defended in a fierce skirmish between the two armies the following day. General William Howe, unwilling to risk a costly frontal attack, did not attempt to advance further up the island for another two months.

== Background ==
The American Revolutionary War had not gone well for the British military in 1775 and early 1776. At besieged Boston, the arrival of heavy guns for the Continental Army camp prompted General William Howe to withdraw from Boston to Halifax, Nova Scotia in March 1776. He regrouped there, acquired supplies and reinforcements, and embarked in June on a campaign to gain control of New York City. Anticipating that the British would next attack New York, General George Washington moved his army there to assist General Israel Putnam in the defensive preparations, a task complicated by the large number of potential landing sites for a British force.

Howe's troops began an unopposed landing on Staten Island in early July, and made another unopposed landing on Long Island, where Washington's Continental Army had organized significant defenses, on August 22. On August 27, Howe successfully flanked Washington's defenses in the Battle of Long Island, leaving Washington in a precarious position on the narrow Brooklyn Heights, with the British Army in front and the East River behind him. On the night of August 29–30, Washington successfully evacuated his entire army of 9,000 troops to York Island (as Manhattan was then known).

Despite showing discipline and unity during the evacuation, the army quickly devolved in despair and anger. Large numbers of militia, many of whose summertime enlistments ended in August, departed for home. Leadership was questioned in the ranks, with soldiers openly wishing for the return of the colorful and charismatic General Charles Lee. Washington sent a missive to the Second Continental Congress in Philadelphia asking for some direction—specifically, if New York City, which then occupied only the southern tip of Manhattan Island, should be abandoned and burned to the ground. "They would derive great conveniences from it, on the one hand, and much property would be destroyed on the other," Washington wrote.

== Geography ==
York Island was occupied principally on the southern tip (now Lower Manhattan) by New York City, on the western tip by Greenwich Village, and in the north by the village of Harlem. The sparsely populated center of the island featured a few low hills, principally Indianburg and Crown Heights. Ferry services connected the island to the surrounding lands, with the primary ferry to the mainland of Westchester County (now the Bronx) crossing the Harlem River at King's Bridge near the northern tip of the island. The island was bordered by two rivers, on the west by the Hudson River and on the east by the East River, which separated the island from Long Island. Kip's Bay was a cove on the eastern shore of the island, extending roughly from present-day 32nd to 38th Streets, and as far west as Second Avenue. The bay no longer exists as such, having been filled in, but in 1776, it provided an excellent place for an amphibious landing: deep water close to the shore, and a large meadow for mustering landed troops. Opposite the bay on Long Island, the wide mouth of Newtown Creek, also surrounded by meadowlands, offered an equally excellent staging area.

== Planning ==
Washington, uncertain of General Howe's next step, spread his troops thinly along the shores of York Island and the Westchester shore, and actively sought intelligence that would yield clues to Howe's plans. He also ordered an attempt against HMS Eagle, the flagship of General Howe's brother and commander of the Royal Navy at New York, Admiral Richard Howe. On September 7, in the first documented case of submarine warfare, Sergeant Ezra Lee volunteered to pilot the submersible Turtle to Eagle and attach explosives to the ship; the submersible's drill struck an iron band it could not penetrate, and Lee was unable to attach the required explosives. Lee was able to escape, although he was forced to release his explosive payload to fend off small boats sent by the British to investigate when he surfaced to orient himself. The payload exploded harmlessly in the East River.

Meanwhile, British troops, led by General Howe, were moving north up the east shore of the East River, towards King's Bridge. During the night of September 3 the British frigate Rose took advantage of a north-flowing tide and, towing thirty flatboats, moved up the East River and anchored in the mouth of Newtown Creek. The next day, more transports and flatboats moved up the East River. Three warships—HMS Renown, HMS Repulse and HMS Pearl—along with the schooner HMS Tryal, sailed into the Hudson.

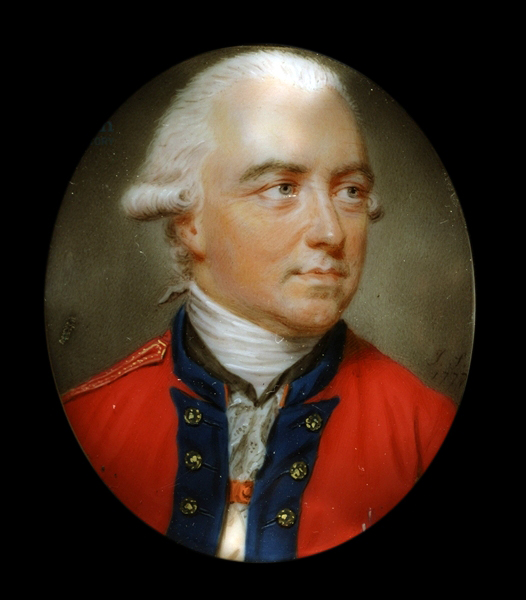
Portrait of Sir Henry Clinton made a year after the landing

On September 5, General Nathanael Greene, recently returned to duty from a serious illness, sent Washington a letter urging an immediate withdrawal from New York. Without possession of Long Island, Greene argued, New York City could not be held. With the army scattered in encampments on York Island, the Americans would not be able to stop a British attack. Another decisive defeat, he argued, would be catastrophic with regard to the loss of men and the damage to morale. He also recommended burning the city; once the British had control, it could never be recovered without a comparable or superior naval force. There was no American benefit to preserving New York City, Greene summarized, and recommended that Washington convene a war council. By the time the council was gathered on September 7, however, a letter had arrived from John Hancock stating Congress's resolution that although New York should not be destroyed, Washington was not required to defend it. Congress had also decided to send a three-man delegation to confer with Lord Howe—John Adams, Benjamin Franklin, and Edward Rutledge.

== Preparations ==
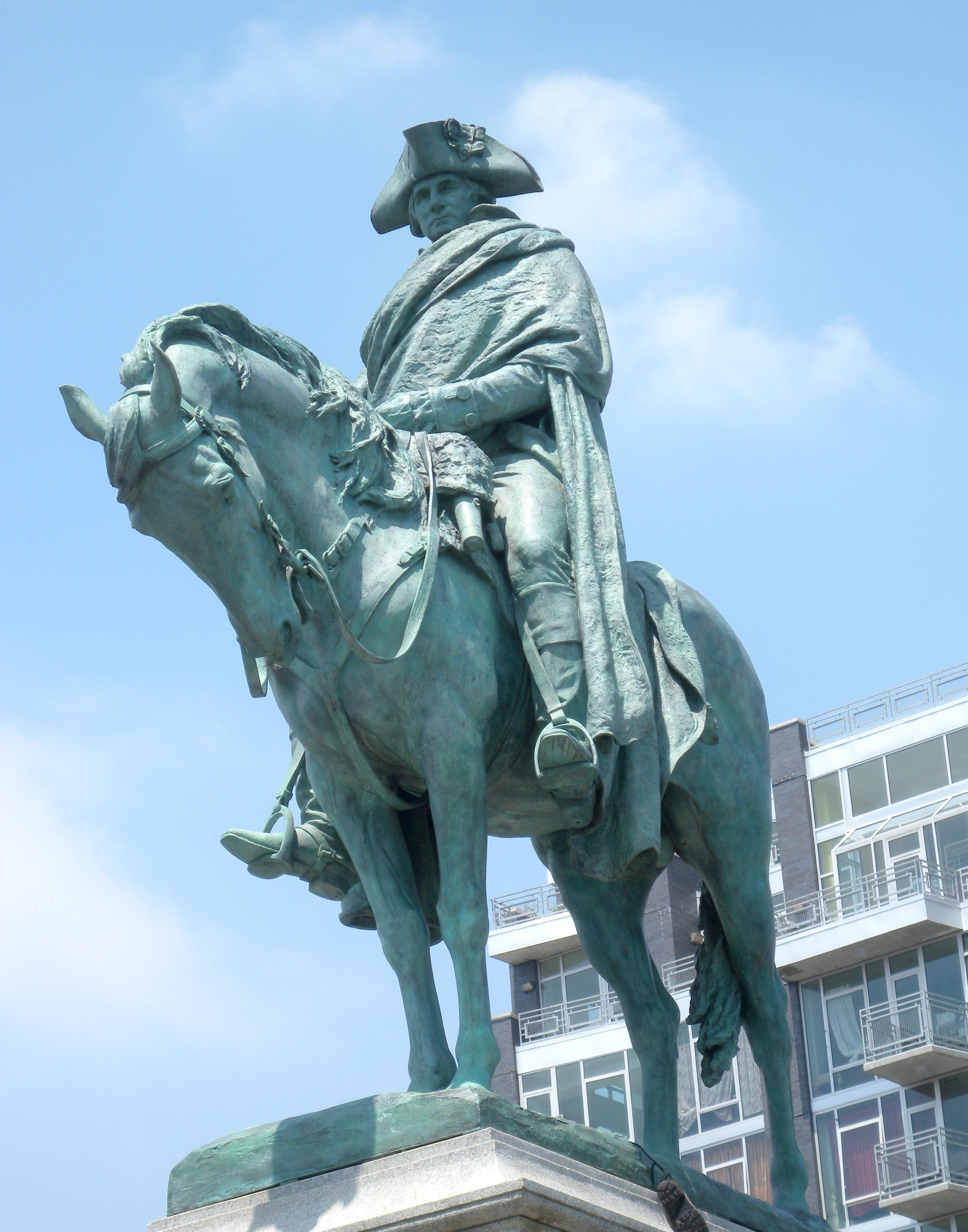
Statue of George Washington in Brooklyn

On September 10, British troops moved from Long Island to occupy Montresor's Island, a small island at the mouth of the Harlem River. One day later, on September 11, the Congressional delegation arrived on Staten Island and met with Admiral Lord Howe for several hours. The meeting came to nothing, as Lord Howe was not authorized to grant terms the Congressional delegation insisted on. It did, however, postpone the impending British attack, allowing Washington more time to decide if and where to confront the enemy.

In a September 12 war council, Washington and his generals made the decision to abandon New York City. Four thousand Continentals under General Putnam remained to defend the city and lower Manhattan while the main army moved north to Harlem and King's Bridge. On the afternoon of September 13, major British movement started as the warships Roebuck and Phoenix, along with the frigates Orpheus and Carysfort, moved up the East River and anchored in Bushwick Creek, carrying 148 total cannons and accompanied by six troop transport ships. By September 14 the Americans were urgently moving stores of ammunition and other materiel, along with American sick, to Orangetown, New York. Every available horse and wagon was employed in what Joseph Reed described as a "grand military exertion". Scouts reported movement in the British army camps but Washington was still uncertain where the British would strike. Late that afternoon, most of the American army had moved north to King's Bridge and Harlem Heights, and Washington followed that night.

General Howe had originally planned a landing for September 13, recalling the date of James Wolfe's key landing before the Battle of the Plains of Abraham in 1759. He and General Clinton disagreed on the point of attack, with Clinton arguing that a landing at King's Bridge would have cut Washington off once and for all. Howe originally wanted to make two landings, one at Kip's Bay and another at Horn's Hook, further north (near modern 90th Street) on the eastern shore. He struck the latter option when ship's pilots warned of the dangerous waters of the Hell Gate, where the Harlem River and waters of Long Island Sound meet the East River. After delays due to unfavorable winds, the landing, targeted for Kip's Bay, began on the morning of September 15.

== Landing ==
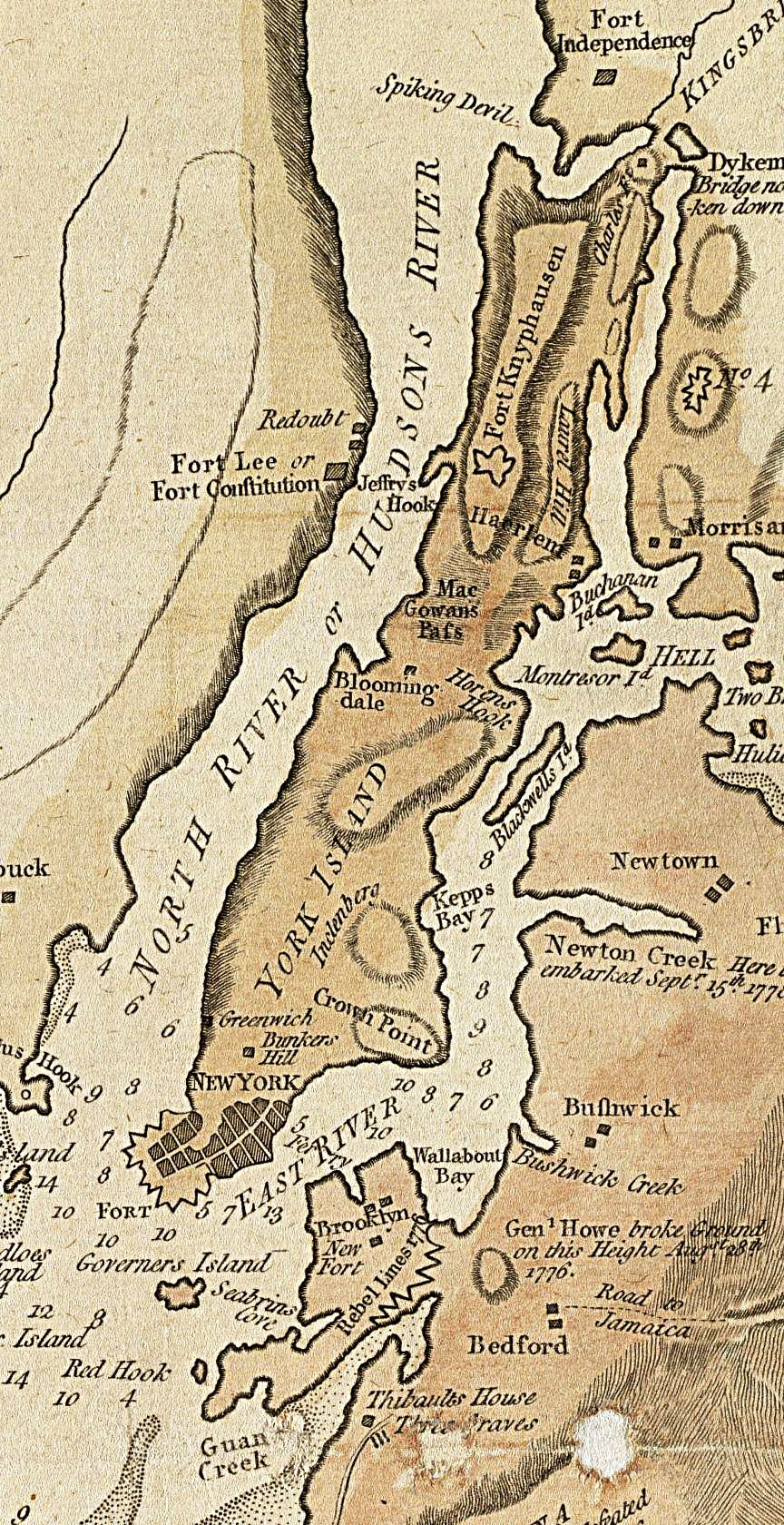
A 1781 British map depicting Manhattan. Kip's Bay is on the East River, labelled "Kepp's Bay".

Admiral Howe sent a noisy demonstration of Royal Navy ships up the Hudson River early on the morning of September 15, but Washington and his aides determined that it was a diversion and maintained their forces at the north end of the island. Five hundred Connecticut militia under the command of Colonel William Douglas had erected a crude breastwork on the American line at Kip's Bay, but many of these farmers and shopkeepers were inexperienced and had no muskets. They carried instead homemade pikes constructed of scythe blades attached to poles. After having been awake all night, and having had little or nothing to eat in the previous twenty-four hours, at dawn they looked over their meager redoubt to see five British warships in the East River near their position. As the militia at Kip's Bay lay in their ditches, the British ships, anchored 200 yd (180 m) offshore, also lay quiet. The day was oppressively hot. At about 10 a.m. General Sir Henry Clinton, to whom Howe had given the task of making the landing, ordered the crossing to begin. A first wave of more than eighty flatboats carried 4,000 British and Hessian soldiers, standing shoulder to shoulder, left Newtown Cove on Long Island and entered the waters of the East River, heading towards Kip's Bay on Manhattan Island.

Around eleven a.m. the five warships began a salvo of broadside fire that flattened the flimsy American breastworks and panicked the Connecticut militia. "So terrible and so incessant a roar of guns few even in the army and navy had ever heard before," wrote Ambrose Serle, private secretary to Lord Howe. Nearly eighty guns fired at the shore for a full hour. The Americans were half buried under dirt and sand, and were unable to return fire due to the smoke and dust. After the guns ceased, the British flatboats appeared out of the smoke and headed for shore. By then the Americans were in a panicked retreat, and the British began their amphibious landing.

Although Washington and his aides arrived from the command post at Harlem Heights soon after the landing began, they were unable to rally the retreating militia. About a mile (1.6 km) inland from Kip's Bay, Washington rode his horse among the men, trying to turn them around and impose some order on them, cursing furiously and violently. By some accounts, he lost control of his temper; he brandished a cocked pistol and drew his sword, threatening to run men through and shouted, "Take the walls! Take the cornfield!" When no one obeyed, he threw his hat to the ground, exclaiming in disgust, "Are these the men with which I am to defend America?" When some fleeing men refused to turn and engage a party of advancing Hessians, Washington reportedly struck some of their officers with his riding crop. The Hessians shot or bayoneted a number of American troops who were trying to surrender. Two thousand Continental Army troops under the command of Generals Samuel Parsons and John Fellows arrived from the north, but at the sight of the chaotic militia retreat, they also turned and fled. Washington, still in a rage, rode within a hundred yards of the enemy, "stupefied, immobilized by his seething fury, was heedless. One of his men grabbed the reins of his horse and hurried Washington to a safer place."

More and more British soldiers came ashore, including light infantry, grenadiers, and Hessian Jägers. They spread out, advancing in several directions. By late afternoon, another 9,000 British troops had landed at Kip's Bay, and Howe had sent a brigade south toward New York City. While most of the Americans managed to escape to the north, not all got away. "I saw a Hessian sever a rebel's head from his body and clap it on a pole in the entrenchments," recorded a British officer. The southern advance pushed for a half mile (0.8 km) to Watts farm (near present-day 23rd Street) before meeting stiff American resistance. The northern advance stopped at the Inclenberg (now Murray Hill, a rise west of Kip's Bay), just west of the present Lexington Avenue, under orders from General Howe to wait for the rest of the invading force. This was extremely fortunate for the thousands of American troops south of the invasion point. Had Clinton continued west to the Hudson he would have cut off General Putnam's troops, nearly one third of Washington's forces, from the main army, trapping them in lower Manhattan.

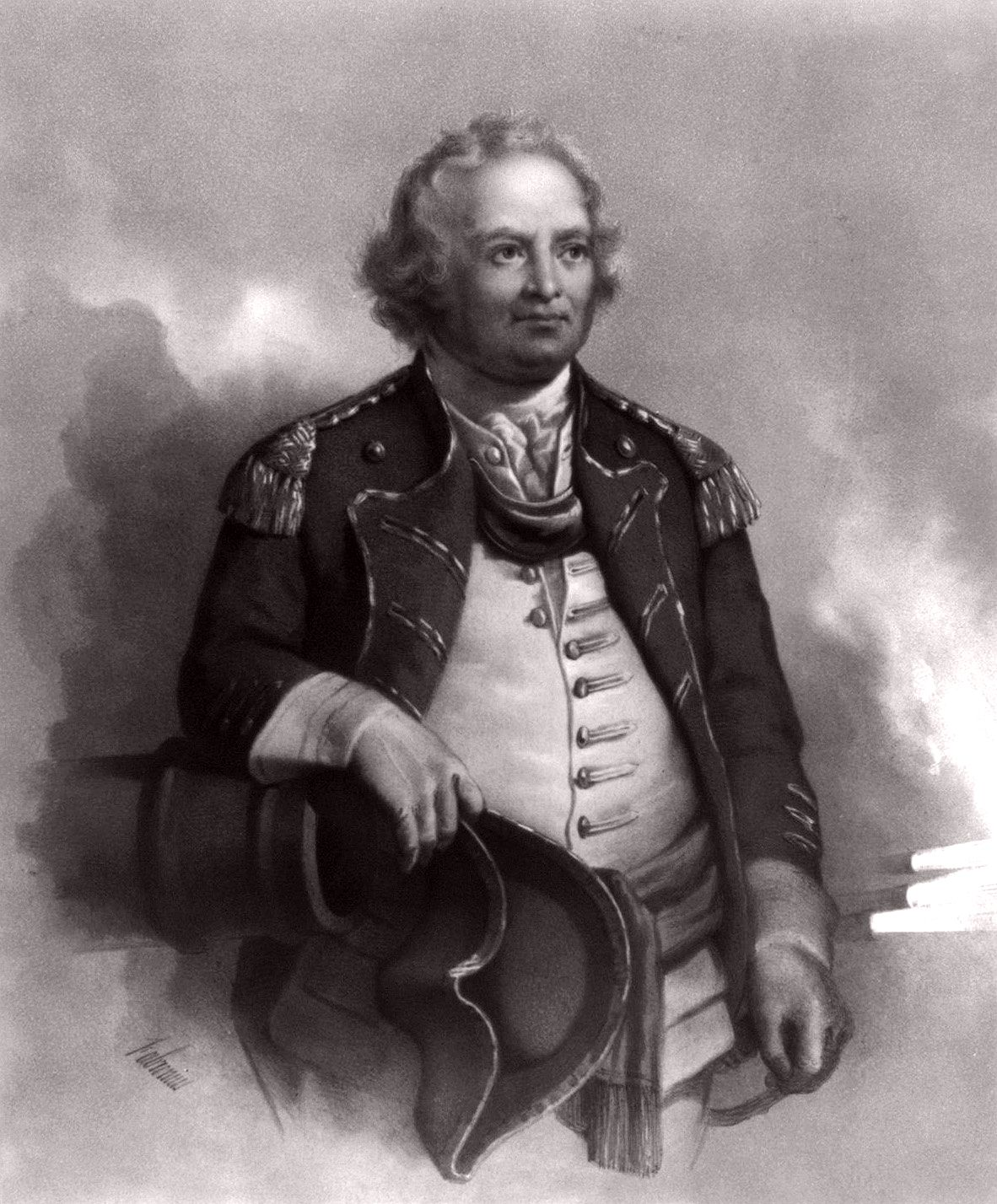
General Israel Putnam

General Putnam had come north with some of his troops when the landing began. After briefly conferring with Washington about the risk of entrapment to his forces in the city, he rode south to lead their retreat. Abandoning supplies and equipment that would slow them down, his column, under the guidance of his aide Aaron Burr, a local, marched north along the Hudson. The forced march of Putnam's men was so quick, and the British advance sufficiently slow, that only the last companies in Putnam's column skirmished with the advancing British, including Alexander Hamilton's artillery. When Putnam and his men marched into the main camp at Harlem after dark, they were greeted by cheers, having been given up for lost. Henry Knox arrived later after a narrow escape made possible by seizing a boat on the Hudson and he too received an excited and enthusiastic greeting, and was even embraced by Washington.

== Aftermath ==
The British were welcomed by the remaining New York City population, pulling down the Continental Army flag and raising the Union Flag. Howe, who had wanted to capture New York quickly and with minimal bloodshed, considered the invasion a complete success. Not wanting to continue battling with the Americans that day, Howe stopped his troops short of Harlem.

Washington was extremely angry with his troops' conduct, calling their actions "shameful" and "scandalous". The Connecticut militia, who already had a poor reputation, were labeled cowards and held to blame for the rout. However, others were more circumspect, such as General William Heath, who said, "The wounds received on Long Island were yet bleeding; and the officers, if not the men, knew that the city was not to be defended." If the Connecticut men had stayed to defend York Island under the withering cannon fire and in the face of overwhelming force, they would have been annihilated.

The next day, September 16, there was further fighting when a clash of outposts escalated into a running battle below Washington's lines on Harlem Heights. After several hours exchange of musketry, the forces engaged returned to their start lines, and the position of the two armies on Manhattan remained relatively unchanged for the next two months. Having held their own against picked British troops, the American army received a much needed boost to their morale after the debacle of the previous day, while the British acquired a renewed respect for the American ability to stand and fight.

== See also ==
- American Revolutionary War §British New York counter-offensive. The 'Landing at Kip's Bay' placed in overall sequence and strategic context.
