= Julia Hunt Catlin Park DePew Taufflieb =

American socialite

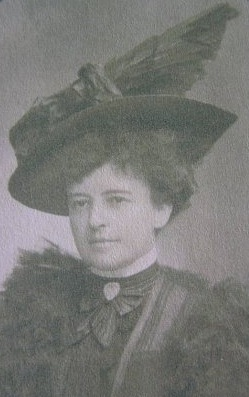
- Taufflieb c. 1920s
- Born: July 6, 1864; Bennington, Vermont, U.S.
- Died: December 17, 1947 (aged 83); Cannes, France
- Spouses: Trenor Luther Park (m. 1889; died 1906) C. Mitchell Depew (m. 1911; div. 1916) Emile Adolphe Taufflieb (m. 1918; died 1938)
- Children: 3
- Awards: Croix de Guerre; Legion d'honneur

Julia Hunt Catlin Park DePew Taufflieb (July 6, 1864 – December 17, 1947) was a philanthropist and socialite who was the first American woman to be awarded the Croix de Guerre and Legion d'honneur by France in 1917 for turning her Château d'Annel into a 300-bed hospital during World War I.

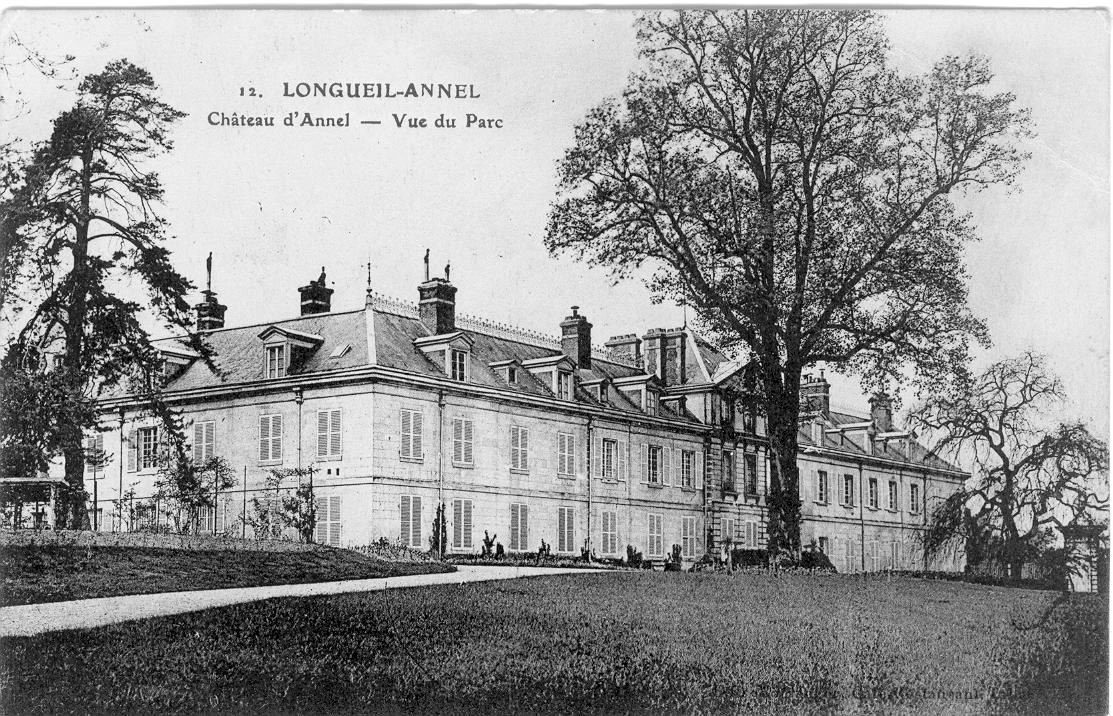
Château d'Annel, Longueil, France

== Early life ==
Julia Hunt Catlin was born on July 6, 1864, to Julius Catlin (1833–1893) and Frances Helen Hunt (b. 1839), the daughter of Seth B. Hunt, Esq. of Maple Grove, Bennington, Vermont. Her sisters were Edith Catlin and May Catlin. She lived at 16 East 49th Street in New York City.

Her paternal grandfather was Julius Catlin, the 29th Lieutenant Governor of Connecticut from 1858 to 1861. Her aunt, Hannah Maria Catlin, married Benjamin K. Phelps, the New York County District Attorney.

== During World War I ==
Julia turned her Château d'Annel in Longueil-Annel into a 300-bed Allied military hospital at the front lines of World War I. It was the first hospital for the Allies' wounded soldiers opened in France by an American so near the front.

She fled for England after the German army had made progress towards Paris, but ended up returning after they had retreated. Her actions moved many other Americans living in France to open military hospitals. She received France's highest military award, the Legion d'honneur, and the Croix de Guerre in 1917 and was the first American female to be awarded this honour.

In 1917, President Raymond Poincaré of France, upon the recommendation of the Minister of War, conferred a gold medal on her in recognition of her hospital, along with a letter written by Justin Godart, the Under Secretary of War.

=== World War II ===
In 1940, during World War II, she was forced to leave her villa in Cannes after the fall of France. She escaped through Spain and sailed from Lisbon on one of the last refugee ships. During the War, she resided in Santa Barbara and Beverly Hills in California.

== Personal life ==
In 1889, she married Trenor Luther Park (1861–1907), the son of Trenor W. Park, at Zion Church in New York. Park, who was the Commodore of the American Yacht Club, died in 1907 after an operation by Dr. Francis Delafield. He was Vice President of the American Trading Company, a directory of Jefferson Bank, and a senior member of Catlin & Co., a dry goods firm. Before his death in 1907, they were the parents of three children, but only one, Frances, lived to maturity:

- Edith Laura Park (1893–1893), who died aged 3 days
- Frances Trenor Hall Park (1894–1937), who married Captain Dr. Ernest Gerard Stanley (1886–1970) of the British Army in the American Church on the Avenue de l'Alma in Paris in 1917.
- Julia Elliot Park (1897–1906), who died aged 9, by falling through a plate glass roof of their residence, 17 East 63rd Street, in New York City.

Upon Park's death, she was left $3,000,000 from her husband's estate. After his death, she resided, with their daughter, at 74 Avenue de Bois de Boulogne, in Paris, and also at her country residence, Château d'Annel, in Longueil d'Annel.

On February 15, 1911, she married Chauncey Mitchell Depew (1867–1927) at the King's Weigh House Church in London. He was originally from Buffalo, New York, the son of William Beverly Depew (1837–1897) and the nephew of Sen. Chauncey Depew, who unveiled the Statue of Liberty. After "both had other adventures in matrimony," they divorced in 1916.

In 1918, she married General Emile Adolphe Taufflieb (d. 1938), who commanded France's 37th Army Corps and was a member of the French Senate. He had been born at Strasbourg and attended École de Saint-Cyr. They remained married until his death in 1938.

She died on December 17, 1947, at Villa Nevada in Cannes, France. In the late 1890s Queen Victoria's son, Prince Leopold, was staying there, when he fell and died.
