= William Douglas (American soldier) =

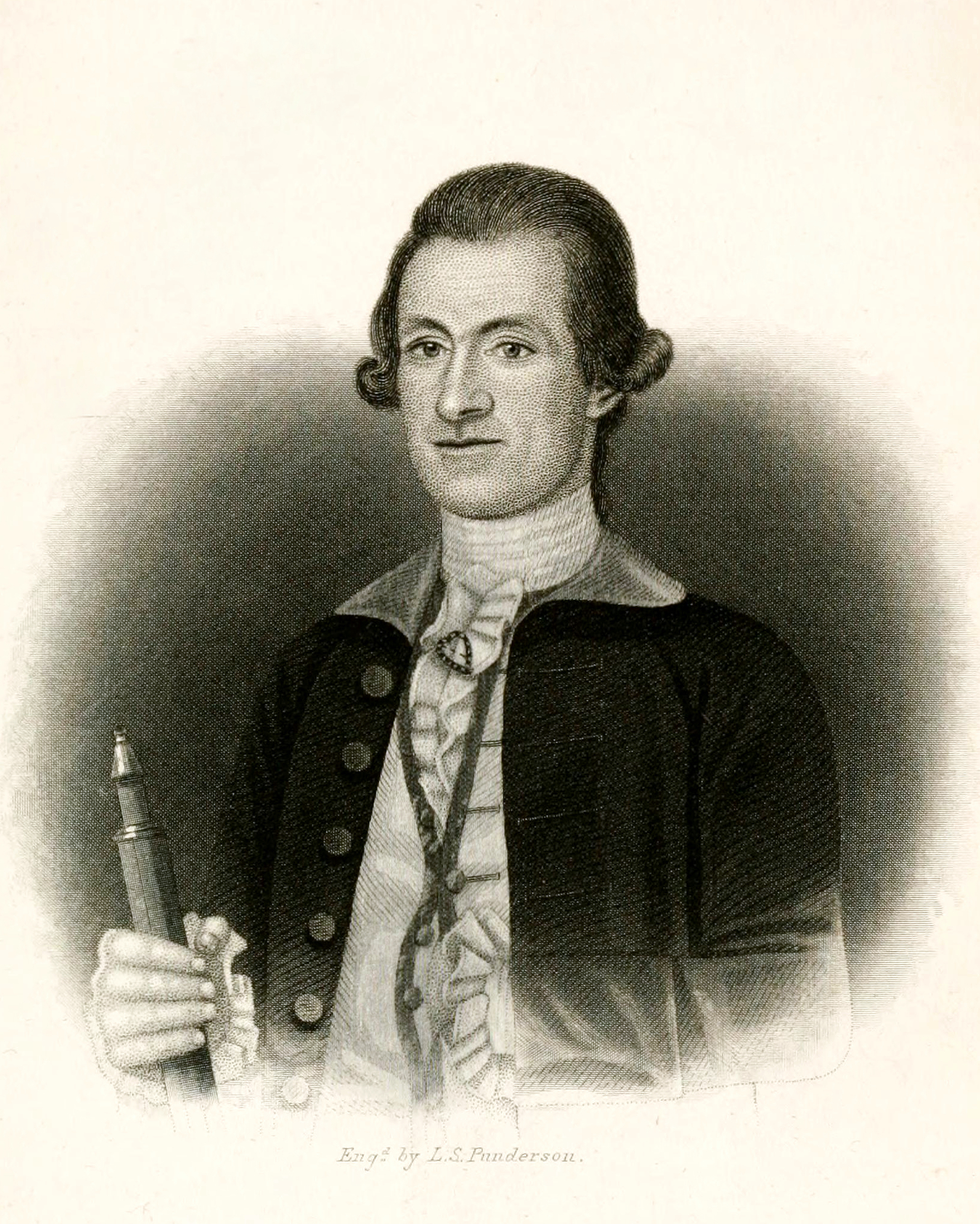
- Born: January 17, 1742; Plainfield, Connecticut Colony, British America
- Died: May 28, 1777 (aged 35) Northford, Connecticut, United States
- Allegiance: United States
- Service years: 1776-1777
- Conflicts: American Revolutionary War; Landing at Kip's Bay; Battle of White Plains
- Children: 1 daughter

Coat of Arms of William Douglas

William Douglas (January 17, 1742 – May 28, 1777) was an American military officer who led regiments from Connecticut during the American Revolutionary War.

The son of John Douglas (1703-1766) and Olive Spaulding (1709-1752), he was born in Plainfield, Connecticut. Douglas began his military career as a soldier in the French and Indian War, rising to the rank of sergeant. Following the war, he became a shipmaster and worked in the maritime trades until the beginning of the American Revolutionary War, when he raised the 6th Company of the 1st Connecticut Regiment and became its captain.

Douglas took part in military campaigns along Lake George and Lake Champlain, commanding ships in upstate New York and was stationed in Montreal. In 1776, he was promoted twice, first to major and then on June 20 as colonel of the Connecticut State Regiment, also known as the "Connecticut 5th battalion".

Douglas privately acknowledged in letters to his wife that his troops were often ill-equipped for battle, writing at one point that they “give me much fatigue and trouble.” During the landing of British troops at Kips Bay in New York City on September 15, 1776, Douglas’ troops retreated wildly in the face of the British attack. General George Washington, encountering the retreating troops, reacted angrily by flogging some of Douglas’ troops with his riding cane and declaring: “Are these the men with whom I am to defend America?”

Douglas and his regiment also participated in the Battle of White Plains on October 28, 1776. On January 1, 1777, he was commissioned as a colonel of the 6th Connecticut Regiment. However, his health deteriorated during the course of the war and he was forced to return to his home at Northford, Connecticut, where he died on May 28, 1777.

Col Douglas married Hannah, daughter of Stephen Mansfield, of New Haven, on 5 July 1767 where she was born 17th November 1747, dying in Northford, 22 May 1825.

His daughter Olive Douglas married Solomon Fowler and had daughter Charlotte Fowler (1805–1873), who married missionary Dwight Baldwin, and had several other notable descendants.

Douglas' grandson Benjamin Douglas was a manufacturer, Mayor of Middletown, Connecticut, and lieutenant governor of Connecticut from 1861-62. Another grandchild, Charlotte Fowler Baldwin (1805-1873), was a missionary in Hawaii.
