= Julius Catlin =

American politician

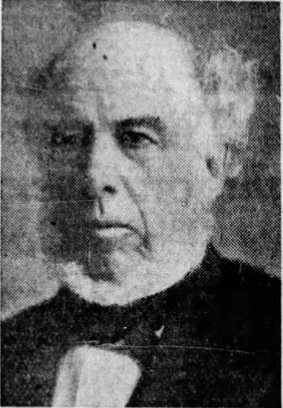

49th Lieutenant Governor of Connecticut
- In office 1858–1861
- Governor: William Alfred Buckingham
- Preceded by: Alfred A. Burnham
- Succeeded by: Benjamin Douglas

Personal details
- Born: December 14, 1798
- Died: January 21, 1888 (aged 89) Hartford, Connecticut
- Political party: Republican
- Spouse: Mary Fisher (died 1888)

Julius Catlin (December 14, 1798 – April 23, 1888) was an American politician who was the 49th Lieutenant Governor of Connecticut from 1858 to 1861. His estate was valued at $726,000 at his death in 1888, and was made a Colonel before entering the dry goods business.

== Early life ==
Catlin was born on December 14, 1798, to Grove Catlin, and was from Hartford in Hartford County, Connecticut. His sister, Flora Belle Catlin (1794–1878), an artist and a teacher of the arts at the Hartford Female Seminary, lived with him after the death of their father.

== Career ==
Catlin was a successful dry goods merchant in Hartford, and "accumulated a large property."

Catlin was interested in public affairs and after winning election, served as the Republican Lieutenant Governor of Connecticut from 1858 to 1861, under the famous "war governor" William Alfred Buckingham. He also presided over the Connecticut State Senate.

== Personal life ==
Catlin was married to Mary Fisher (1803–1888), a native of Wrentham, Massachusetts, a descendant of John Mason "whose ancestors crossed the ocean with the Pilgrims on the Mayflower." Together, they lived in Hartford and had a home at Watch Hill in Rhode Island and were the parents of:

- Mary Jane Catlin (1830–1836), who died in childhood.
- Hannah Maria Catlin (1831–1880), who married Benjamin Kinsman Phelps, the law partner of future U.S. President Chester A. Arthur who served as New York County District Attorney.
- Julius Catlin Jr. (1833–1893), who was a dry goods merchant who married Frances Helen Hunt (b. 1839) in 1862.
- Charles Catlin (1837–1918), a woolen merchant with Mullen & Co. who married Laura Almina Wood of Rouses Point, granddaughter of Eliza Yale and Joshua P. Hammond of the Yale family.
- Mary Catlin (1839–1839), who died in infancy.

Catlin died at his home in Hartford (the former home of Lydia Huntley Sigourney) on April 23, 1888. He was buried at the Cedar Hill Cemetery in Hartford. At the time of his death, the principal value of his estate was $726,000.

=== Descendants ===
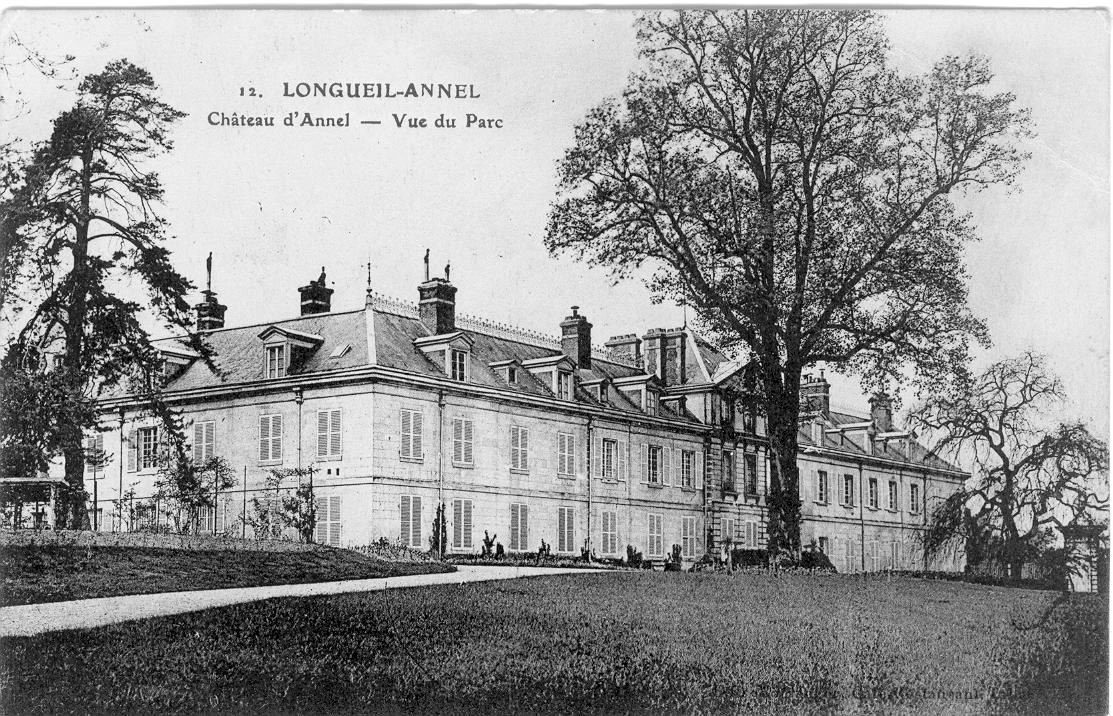
Chateau d'Annel, Julia Hunt Catlin's property used during World War I

Through his son Julius, he was the paternal grandfather of three girls, Julia Hunt Catlin (1864–1947), Edith Catlin and May Catlin.

Julia became multimillionaire, received the Croix de Guerre and Legion d'honneur, and was married three times.

For her first marriage, she married Trenor Luther Park, son of Trenor W. Park, a founder of the Republican Party of California and business rival of robber baron Jay Gould. He was the proprietor of banks and railroads and was an associate of Horace Henry Baxter and Cornelius Vanderbilt. His grandfather was Congressman and Governor of Vermont Hiland Hall.

She married second to C. Mitchell Depew, a nephew of Senator Chauncey Depew, who became Secretary of State of New York, President of the New York Central Railroad for Cornelius Vanderbilt, and a founding member of the Yale Club. He was also a member of The Four Hundred of the Gilded Age, President of the Linonian Society, and a member of the Skulls and Bones.

For the third marriage, she married Emile Adolphe Taufflieb, a French Senator and General during World War I.

Political offices
Preceded by Alfred A. Burnham	Lieutenant Governor of Connecticut; 1858–1861	Succeeded by Benjamin Douglas
