= 1858 Connecticut lieutenant gubernatorial election =

- April 7, 1858
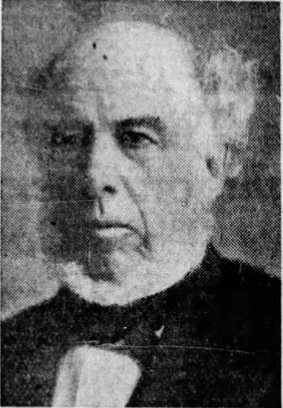

Nominee	Julius Catlin	John Cotton Smith
Party	Republican	Democratic
Popular vote	36,365	31,910
Percentage	52.00%	45.60%
Lieutenant Governor before election
Alfred A. Burnham
Republican
Elected Lieutenant Governor
Julius Catlin
Republican

The 1858 Connecticut lieutenant gubernatorial election was held on April 7, 1858, to elect the lieutenant governor of Connecticut. Republican nominee Julius Catlin won the election against Democratic nominee John Cotton Smith.

== General election ==
On election day, April 7, 1858, Republican nominee Julius Catlin won the election with 52.00% of the vote, thereby retaining Republican control over the office of lieutenant governor. Catlin was sworn in as the 49th lieutenant governor of Connecticut on May 5, 1858.

=== Results ===
Connecticut lieutenant gubernatorial election, 1858
Party	Candidate	Votes	%
Republican	Julius Catlin	36,365	52.00
Democratic	John Cotton Smith	31,910	45.60
	Scattering	1,659	2.40
Total votes		69,925	100.00
Republican hold			
