= Horace Henry Baxter =

American businessman

Horace H. Baxter
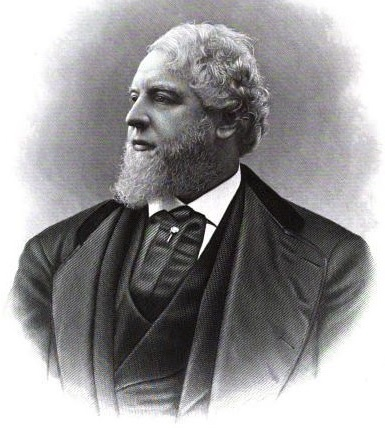
- Frontispiece of the 1884 commemorative book Memorial: H. Henry Baxter
- Born: January 8, 1818; Saxtons River, Vermont
- Died: February 17, 1884 (aged 66); New York City, New York
- Resting place: Evergreen Cemetery, Rutland
- Occupation: Businessman
- Spouse(s): Eliza Wales (m. 1841. d. 1849) Mary Roberts (m. 1851)

Horace Henry Baxter (January 8, 1818 – February 17, 1884) was a Vermont businessman who served as Adjutant General of Vermont at the start of the American Civil War. He became President of the New York Central Railroad and was one of the major shareholders with Cornelius Vanderbilt.

== Early life ==
H. Henry Baxter, the son of Judge Henry Baxter, was born in Saxtons River, Vermont, on January 8, 1818. He attended schools in Windham and Windsor Counties, and at age 15, he became a clerk in a Boston dry goods commission warehouse. He worked in Boston for two years and became a supervisor of employees as the warehouse's head bookkeeper.

In the mid-1830s, Baxter returned to Vermont after securing the financing to open his own dry goods store in Bellows Falls. Having extended credit to his customers during the Panic of 1837, Baxter did not receive timely repayment. He closed the store when he was unable to run it profitably.

== Business career ==
Despite bouts of ill health usually caused by overwork, Baxter was a large man with a commanding presence. Drawing on these traits and his experience managing employees in Boston, in the early 1840s Baxter bid successfully for the contract to grade the rail bed and lay track for the Rutland and Burlington Railroad. Baxter personally supervised his workers and completed the Rutland and Burlington contract successfully. His success led to construction work for other railroads, including the Western Vermont and Cleveland and Toledo. Baxter then settled in Rutland and purchased the Rutland Marble Company. Baxter operated Rutland Marble in partnership with his brother John N. Baxter and Charles Clement and Sons, which included Percival W. Clement. Rutland Marble employed Redfield Proctor as Manager.

Baxter operated a farm on Creek Road. Baxter called his farm Maple Grove, and raised cattle, sheep and thoroughbred horses. Baxter also constructed a mansion at Maple Grove, which he called Grove Hall. After his death, his home was operated as the Crestwood Hotel until it was demolished in 1945.

== Military career ==
Having served as a captain in a militia unit called the Rutland Light Guards, in 1859 Baxter was appointed Adjutant General of the Vermont Militia, and was succeeded as company commander by William Y. W. Ripley. He took steps to prepare the militia in anticipation of the Civil War, and also served as a Delegate to the Peace Conference that attempted to prevent the conflict.

After the war started, Baxter was responsible for recruiting the 1st Vermont Infantry, a regiment enlisted for three months' service. Baxter used his own funds to ensure that 1st Vermont soldiers were equipped and paid prior to departing for service in the Washington, D.C. area and rode at the head of the regiment as it departed Vermont.

In 1861 he relinquished the Adjutant General's position in favor of someone with combat experience and was succeeded by Peter T. Washburn, who had been the lieutenant colonel of the 1st Vermont and its de facto commander.

== Later career ==
After leaving the Adjutant General's post, Baxter returned to his business interests. He sold the Rutland Marble Company to Proctor and pursued several other opportunities, including founding the Rutland County Bank.

After selling Rutland Marble, Baxter resided in New York City and Rutland. An associate of Cornelius Vanderbilt, he was a major investor in the New York Central Railroad, serving as president from 1867 to 1869, and a member of the board of directors from 1869 until his death. In 1870 he incorporated Rutland's Baxter National Bank, of which he was president until his death.

In addition to his business association with Cornelius Vanderbilt, Baxter sometimes partnered with Trenor W. Park. Baxter's other holdings included large ownership stakes in and/or board of directors memberships with: the Chicago & North Western Railroad; Emma Silver Mine; Pacific Mail Steamship Company; Hannibal & St. Joseph Railroad; Panama Canal Railway; Continental Bank of New York City; and the Pullman Palace Car Company. He also owned a construction company which built most of New York City's elevated railway and was the primary investor in Rutland's gas lighting company.

== Death and burial ==
Baxter was in increasingly poor health in his later years, especially after a 1877 fall left him with a debilitating back injury. He was often bedridden but continued to actively manage his investments until his death in New York City on February 17, 1884. He was buried in Rutland's Evergreen Cemetery.

== Family ==
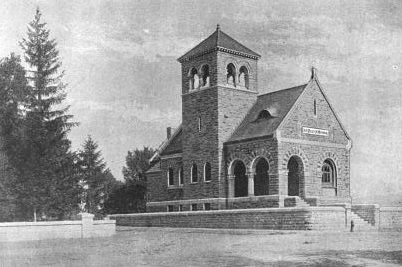
H. H. Baxter Memorial Library, Rutland, Vermont. Now the Rutland Jewish Center.

In 1841, Baxter married Eliza Wales of Bellows Falls. They had no children, and Eliza died in 1849. In 1851, Baxter married Mary Roberts of Manchester, Vermont. They had two sons, Henry (1856-1860) and Hugh (1862-1945). Hugh Baxter was one of America's first well-known pole vaulters. He held the national title from 1883 to 1886 and set a world record of 11' 1/2" in 1883. He was beaten only once during his pole-vaulting career, which continued until 1895.

H. Henry Baxter's brother Algernon Sidney Baxter (1819-1897) was a successful businessman in St. Louis, Missouri and New York City. An acquaintance of Ulysses S. Grant from Grant's time as a resident of St. Louis, A. Sidney Baxter served on Grant's staff as a Captain of Quartermasters from 1861 to 1862, resigning because of illness shortly after the Battle of Shiloh.

== Legacy ==
The Gaysvile, Vermont Grand Army of the Republic post was named for him.

Baxter's family contributed to the construction of the H. H. Baxter Memorial Library, a landmark which now serves as Rutland's Jewish Center. The Baxter Library was added to the National Register of Historic Places in 1978.

Military offices
Preceded by George Bradley Kellogg	Vermont Adjutant General; 1859–1861	Succeeded by Peter T. Washburn
Business positions
Preceded by Henry Keep	President of the New York Central Railroad; 1867–1869	Succeeded by Cornelius Vanderbilt
