= Henry Keep (businessman) =

American financier

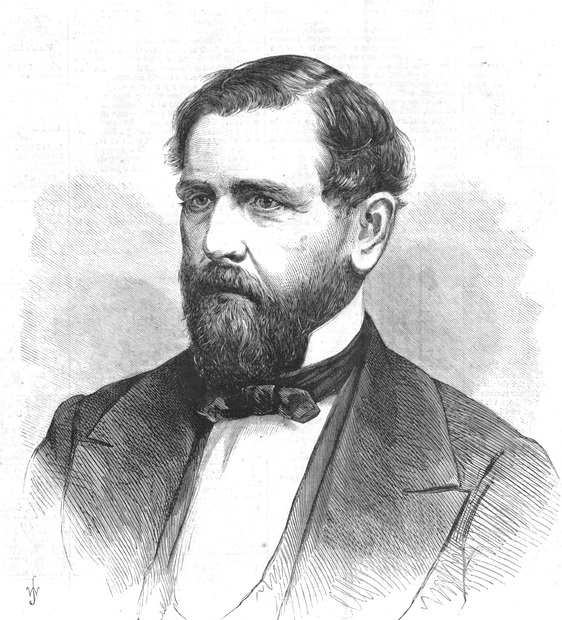
- Henry Keep in 1868
- Born: June 22, 1818; Adams, New York, U.S.
- Died: July 30, 1869 (aged 51); New York City, New York, U.S.
- Occupations: Banker, financier, railroad executive
- Spouse: Emma Woodruff Keep
- Children: Emma Gertrude Keep

Henry Keep (June 22, 1818 – July 30, 1869) was an American currency speculator, banker, stock speculator, and railroad financier who invested heavily in the Chicago and North Western Railway, Cleveland and Toledo Railroad, Michigan Southern and Northern Indiana Railroad, and New York Central Railroad. He was treasurer of the Michigan Southern and Northern Indiana Railroad from 1861 to 1863, and briefly president of the New York Central Railroad in 1866.

== Early life ==
Henry Keep was born on June 22, 1818, in Adams, New York, to Herman Chandler Keep and his wife, Dorothy (née Kent). He had two sisters, Mary and Martha. He was a descendant of John Keep, and emigrant from the Kingdom of England who arrived in the Massachusetts Bay Colony in 1660 and was killed in 1676 during King Philip's War. He was also related to William Ezra Keep, a successful builder in Hartford, Connecticut.

Keep had no schooling as a child. His father died in 1835 when Keep was just 17. His family was left impoverished and lost their home, so his mother turned herself and her children over to the county poorhouse. The county loaned children out as workers to local businessmen and farmers, if the employer provided a wage or some other means of improvement to the child. Keep was sent to work for Joseph Grammon, a local farmer who promised to send the boy to public school. Grammon failed to keep his word, beat the Henry mercilessly, and barely fed him. With $1.50 ($44 in 2025 dollars) and a coat given to him by a friend, Keep ran away. Grammon later offered a reward of two cents for his return.

Keep settled in Honeoye Falls, New York, where he got a job as a teamster on the Erie Canal, and later found a position as a hack driver in nearby Rochester, New York.

== Financier and railroad baron ==
=== Currency speculation ===
During the Panic of 1837, Keep would buy purchased depreciated Watertown banknotes in Rochester, then travel to Watertown (where the notes were worth more) and cash them for a profit. He quickly quadrupled his net worth. He then invested in notes issued by the state, which were trading at a discount due to the economic recession. He then began traveling around upstate New York, where he would approach people carrying Canadian banknotes. These were worthless in the United States, so Keep would exchange his state notes for the Canadian banknotes (at yet another heavy discount). When he had enough Canadian banknotes in hand, Keep would travel to Canada and cash the banknotes at par. He made $500 to $1,000 a week ($17,277 to $34,554 in 2025 dollars) a week in these exchanges.

=== Banking ===
On September 28, 1847, Keep established Henry Keep's Bank in Watertown, New York. Some time in 1850, Keep opened the Frontier Bank in Watertown. On August 1, 1850, Keep opened the Citizens' Bank in Watertown, and in 1852 opened a branch of this bank in Fulton, New York. On September 17, 1851, he opened the Mechanic's Bank in Watertown, and later invested in the Union Bank of Watertown.

Keep proved so successful at banking that he moved to New York City in 1850, and began investment banking operations on Wall Street.

=== Railroading ===
Just prior to the American Civil War, railroad stocks were worth about a nickel each. Keep invested heavily in railroad stocks on the eve of the war, then saw his stocks soar in value as railroads became essential to the war effort. He also made bold trades in undervalued railroads, earning hundreds of thousands of dollars. Along with Jacob Barker, Daniel Drew, James Fisk, Jay Gould, Jacob Little, and Cornelius Vanderbilt, Keep was one of the greatest speculators on the stock market in his day. He also became one of the ablest stock pool managers in the history of the New York Stock Exchange. (Note: A stock pool is where a group of investors pool their money to buy stock in a corporation. The sudden purchase of large numbers of shares drives up the price, attracting more and more investors. Once the price reaches its height, the pool manager slowly starts selling off shares—quietly earning the pool investors a tidy sum.) He was so successful at stock pools that he became one of the first managers of a "blind pool", where not even the contributors to the pool knew which stocks were being bought or sold, when, or at what price. His refusal to talk about his trading schemes earned him the nickname "Henry the Silent".

Keep formed a partnership with LeGrand Lockwood, co-founder of Lockwood & Company. The firm was one of Wall Street's leading brokerage houses, Lockwood was a longtime ally of Cornelius Vanderbilt. Together, the two men manipulated the stock of the Michigan Southern and Northern Indiana Railroad in the 1850s, buying large quantities whenever they forced the price down. They won control of the company in 1859. On April 25, 1860, Keep was elected to its board of directors. He served as its treasurer from 1861 to 1863. Keep solidified his hold on the company in 1863 by breaking Addison G. Jerome, who controlled a majority of the company's stock. Keep noticed that the board of directors was authorized to issue up to 14,000 shares in new stock. Keep called a secret meeting of the board, which excluded Jerome, and the board authorized the issue. Keep began selling small numbers of these shares, and Jerome began buying them up in an attempt to force Keep off the board of directors. To finance his purchases, Jerome engaged in short sales of stock. Keep then dumped the majority of the 14,000 shares on the market, causing the price to drop significantly. Jerome lost $3 million covering his short sales, and was financially broken. (He died a year later.)

Keep also invested heavily in the New York Central Railroad. Beginning in 1865, Cornelius Vanderbilt began to wage a long and bitter war for control of the Central. The Central was governed by a clique of men known as the "Albany Regency", and controlled most of the rail traffic outside of New York City. But Vanderbilt's Hudson River Railroad not only had the only direct link between Albany, New York, and New York City but also had the only rail line into lower Manhattan. Vanderbilt won an agreement with the Central to transfer freight to his line. The contract also required the Central to pay the Hudson River Railroad $100,000 a year ($2,058,511 in 2025 dollars) for keeping extra rolling stock on hand in the summer to handle the increased traffic moving north. Keep, LeGrand Lockwood, and American Express and Wells Fargo founder William Fargo decided to seek control of the Central. They quickly amassed almost two-thirds of the company's stock, and ousted the "Albany Regency". Keep, elected president of the Central on December 12, 1866, immediately revoked the yearly payment. An outraged Vanderbilt stopped carrying all Central freight. Steamboats could not move the Central's cargoes because the Hudson River was frozen due to a harsh winter. Freight backed up in Albany, and New York City was effectively cut off by rail. The Central's stock price fell. In an attempt to make money off the situation, Keep borrowed a significant number of shares to sell short. Flooding the market with shares only drove the price further downward, and Vanderbilt and his allies quickly purchased these shares. This forced Keep to pay his lenders out of his own pocket, hurting him financially, and allowed the Vanderbilt group to gain control of the Central. Keep resigned, and Horace Henry Baxter was named president of the Central in December 1866.

Keep partnered with investor Rufus Hatch, and won control of the Chicago and North Western Railway in 1867. He made $1.5 million ($36,300,000 in 2025 dollars) manipulating the road's stock. He was named its president in June 1868. Marvin Hughett, a veteran manager of the company, convinced him to finance a massive expansion of the railroad's system.

Keep also was one of the largest investors in the Cleveland and Toledo Railroad. He was elected to its board of directors in 1859. He was also a director of the Detroit, Monroe and Toledo Railroad in 1863.

== Personal life and death ==
Keep married Emma Woodruff, daughter of a prominent Watertown hotel owner and real estate developer, in 1847. The couple had just one child, daughter Emma Gertrude Keep.

Keep's health began to fail in early 1869. He was so ill that, on June 18, rumors swept Wall Street that he had died. Keep died late in the evening on July 30, 1869, at his home at 601 Fifth Avenue in New York City. He had just recently offered to donate $1.5 million to anyone willing to found a National Academy of Art. Keep's funeral was held in his home, and he was buried at Brookside Cemetery in Watertown, New York. His widow built a large mausoleum in which he was later laid to rest. In the Adams State Road Cemetery near Adams, New York, is a large mausoleum, built by Henry Keep, in which Keep's parents were laid to rest. Henry Keep's mausoleum was broken into in 1973, and his coffin opened and his remains disturbed. Police said that the vandals probably believed Keep had been buried with jewelry or other valuables. No culprits were ever found.

Keep left his daughter $500,000 ($12,100,000 in 2025 dollars) in railroad stock. His gave his sister Mary two farms near Watertown worth $185,000 ($4,500,000 in 2025 dollars), his sister Martha $200,000 ($4,800,000 in 2025 dollars) in cash, and each of his three sisters-in-law stock worth $100,000 ($2,400,000 in 2025 dollars). The remainder of his estate, valued contemporaneously at $1 million ($24,200,000 in 2025 dollars), and by financial historians at $4.5 million ($108,800,000 in 2025 dollars), went to his wife.

== Legacy ==
Keep's widow built the Henry Keep Home for the elderly, infirm, and widowed in Watertown. It opened in 1883. The building was razed in 1977, and a new structure erected on the same site. It is now known as the Samaritan-Keep House.

Emma Keep also created a foundation in her husband's name to support the Henry Keep Home. The foundation built and currently owns several structures in Watertown: the Centennial Apartments, the Henry Keep Apartments on Washington Street, the Henry Keep Apartments on Public Square, and the Olympic Apartments. It also owns and maintains the Ives Hill Retirement Community as well as Keep House, a place for out-of-town families to stay while their loved ones are receiving medical care at the local hospital.

== Bibliography ==
- America's Successful Men of Affairs: An Encyclopedia of Contemporaneous Biography. Vol. 1. New York: New York Tribune. 1895.
- Carosso, Vincent P. (1975). The New York Stock Exchange. New York: Arno Press. ISBN 9780405069475.
- Chandler, Alfred Dupont (1977). The Visible Hand: The Managerial Revolution in American Business. Cambridge, Mass.: Belknap Press of Harvard University Press. ISBN 9780674940529.
- Commemorative Biographical Record of Hartford County, Connecticut: Containing Biographical Sketches of Prominent and Representative Citizens, and of Many of the Early Settled Families. Chicago: J.H. Beers & Co. 1901.
- Ellis, George W.; Morris, John E. (1906). King Philip's War: Based on the Archives and Records of Massachusetts, Plymouth, Rhode Island and Connecticut, and Contemporary Letters and Accounts, With Biographical and Topographical Notes. New York: The Grafton Press.
- Haddock, John A. (1894). The Growth of a Century: As Illustrated in the History of Jefferson County, New York, From 1793 to 1894. Philadelphia: Sherman & Co.
- Hough, Franklin B. (1854). A History of Jefferson County in the State of New York, From the Earliest Period to the Present Time. Albany, N.Y.: Joel Munsell.
- Ingham, John N. (1983). Biographical Dictionary of American Business Leaders. Vol. 2: H to M. Westport, Conn.: Greenwood Press. ISBN 9780313239083.
- "Keep-Schley, Emma A.". Appleton's Annual Cyclopaedia and Register of Important Events of the Year 1900. Third Series. Vol. V. New York: D. Appleton & Co. 1901.
- Meints, Graydon M. (1992). Michigan Railroads and Railroad Companies. East Lansing. Mich.: Michigan State University Press. ISBN 9780870133183.
- Michigan State Gazetteer and Business Directory for 1863-64. Detroit: Charles F. Clark. 1863.
- Renehan, Edward (2009). Commodore: The Life of Cornelius Vanderbilt. New York: Basic Books. ISBN 9780465002566.
- Shampine, Dave (2010). Colorful Characters of Northern New York: Northern Lights. Charleston, S.C.: History Press. ISBN 9781614232483.
- Sobel, Robert (1999). Panic on Wall Street: A History of America's Financial Disasters. Washington, D.C.: BeardBooks. ISBN 9781893122468.
- Sobel, Robert (2000). Curbstone Brokers: The Origins of the American Stock Exchange. Washington, D.C.: BeardBooks. ISBN 9781893122659.
- Sobel, Robert (2000). The Fallen Colossus. Washington, D.C.: BeardBooks. ISBN 9781893122888.
- Starr, Timothy (2012). Railroad Wars of New York State. Charleston, S.C.: History Press. ISBN 9781609497279.
- Stiles, T.J. (2009). The First Tycoon: The Epic Life of Cornelius Vanderbilt. New York: Alfred A. Knopf. ISBN 9780375415425.
- Tygiel, Jules (1996). The Great Los Angeles Swindle: Oil, Stocks, and Scandal During the Roaring Twenties. Berkeley, Calif.: University of California Press. ISBN 9780520207738.
