= Trenor W. Park =

American politician

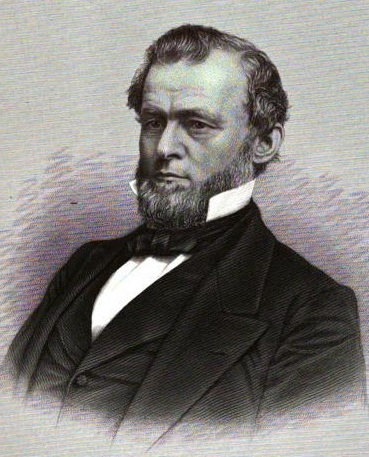
- From 1893's American Encyclopaedia of Biography

Member of the Republican National Committee from Vermont
- In office 1868–1870
- Preceded by: Abraham B. Gardner
- Succeeded by: Luke P. Poland

Member of the Vermont House of Representatives from Bennington
- In office 1865–1869
- Preceded by: Abraham B. Gardner
- Succeeded by: Luther R. Graves

Chair of the California Republican State Central Committee
- In office 1856–1860
- Preceded by: New position
- Succeeded by: William Sherman

Personal details
- Born: December 8, 1823 Woodford, Vermont
- Died: December 13, 1882 (aged 59) Aboard ship San Blas between New York City and Aspinwall, Panama
- Resting place: Old Bennington Cemetery, Bennington, Vermont
- Party: Whig (Before 1856); Republican (From 1856)
- Spouse: Laura Van Der Spiegle Hall (m. 1846–1875, her death)
- Children: 3
- Relatives: Hiland Hall (father in law); John G. McCullough (son in law); Julia Hunt Catlin (daughter in law)
- Occupation: Attorney; Businessman; Politician
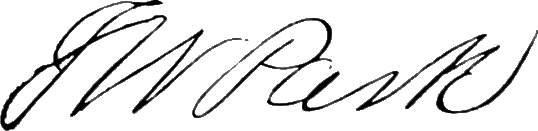
- Signature

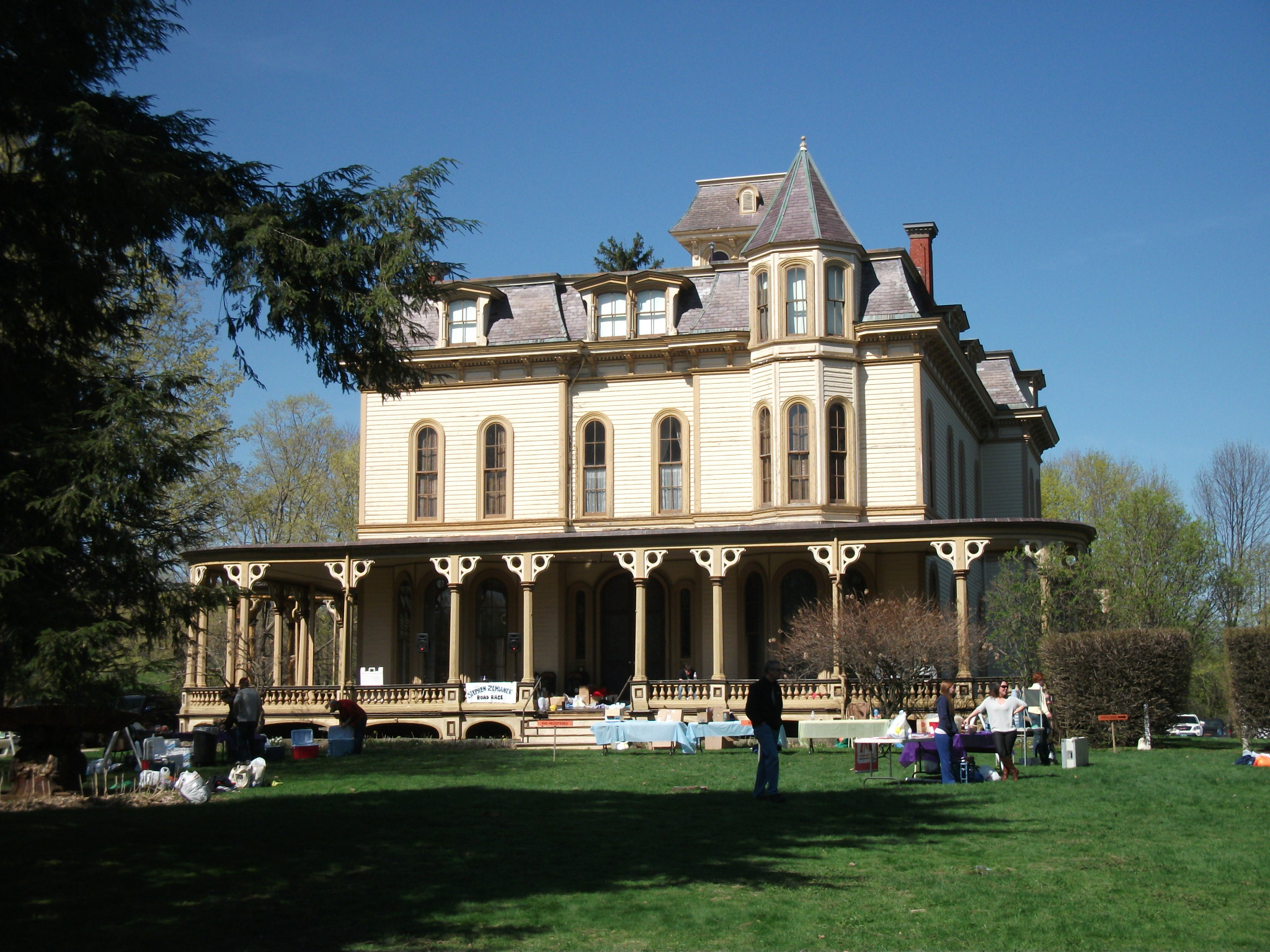
Park-McCullough House, Vermont

Trenor William Park (December 8, 1823 – December 13, 1882) was an American lawyer, political figure, and businessman. He was most notable as a founder of the Republican Party in California, and for his Republican leadership roles in Vermont, including member of the Republican National Committee and the Vermont House of Representatives.

Born in Woodford, Vermont, Park studied law as a teenager, and attained admission to the bar at age 21, as soon as he was legally eligible. He practiced in Bennington until 1852. Park was also a businessman, and invested in lumbering and other ventures. In 1846 he married Laura Van Der Spiegle Hall, whose father Hiland Hall had served as a Congressman and Governor of Vermont. In 1851, Hall was named Chairman of the U.S. Land Commission that settled Mexican land titles after the annexation of California. He relocated to San Francisco, and Park went with him.

In California, Park practiced law and was a founder of the Halleck, Peachy, Billings & Park firm. He continued to pursue business opportunities, including real estate and mining, and became the manager of John C. Frémont's Rancho Las Mariposas gold mine. Park faced temporary financial setbacks during the Panic of 1857, but recovered and became very wealthy. When the Republican Party was organized in the mid-1850s, Park won election as the first Chairman of the state party's Central Committee.

Park returned to Vermont in 1864, and continued to practice law and pursue investments in a variety of businesses while also maintaining a residence in New York City. He also served as a member of the Vermont House of Representatives and Vermont's member of the Republican National Committee. Park was a candidate for the 1874 Republican nomination for Governor but withdrew in favor of Asahel Peck, who went on to win the general election.

A noted civic activist and philanthropist, Park's donations included Bennington's public library, the building and land for the Vermont Soldiers' Home, and the University of Vermont's Park Gallery of Art, which later became part of the university's Robert Hull Fleming Museum. Park died at sea in 1882, and was buried first at Brooklyn, New York's Green-Wood Cemetery, and later at Bennington's Old Cemetery.

== Early life ==
Trenor William Park was born in Woodford, Vermont on December 8, 1823, the son of Luther and Cynthia (Pratt) Park. Park was named for Thomas Trenor, who fled Ireland after taking part in the failed Irish Rebellion of 1798 and became a prominent Bennington businessman and friend of Luther Park. Trenor Park was raised in Bennington and began working at an early age, including selling candy and carrying letters to and from the Bennington post office.

At age 15 Park became the proprietor of a candy store on Bennington's North Street, and at age 16 he began to study law with Bennington County State's Attorney Alanson P. Lyman, attaining admission to the bar as soon as he was legally eligible in 1844. Park began a practice in Bennington, and maintained it until 1852, also becoming active in lumbering and other business ventures. On December 15, 1846, he married Laura Van Der Spiegle Hall, the daughter of Congressman and Governor Hiland Hall. They had three children Eliza, Laura and Trenor Luther Park.

== Career in California ==
In 1851 Hall was appointed Chairman of the U.S. Land Commission empowered to settle Mexican land titles after the annexation of California, and Park traveled to San Francisco with him. He practiced law successfully, soon becoming a partner in the state's leading firm, Halleck, Peachy, Billings & Park. In 1855 Park played a key role in San Francisco's political reform movement by establishing the San Francisco Bulletin newspaper. He also became active in several commercial enterprises, including real estate and mining, and managed the Rancho Las Mariposas gold mine owned by John C. Frémont. Park lost some of his investments in the Panic of 1857, but eventually became very wealthy.

Originally a Whig, at the founding of the Republican Party, Park became an active member, serving as a delegate to several state conventions. When the state party was organized in 1856, Park was selected as the first Chairman of California's Republican State Central Committee. He served until 1860, when he was succeeded by William Sherman. In 1863 he was a Unionist candidate for the U.S. Senate, narrowly losing election in the California legislature. In 1864 he was a California delegate to the Union National Convention that nominated Republican President Abraham Lincoln for reelection and Democrat Andrew Johnson for vice president.

== Return to Vermont ==
In 1864 Park returned to Vermont, where he incorporated the First National Bank of North Bennington, was an original investor in the Central Vermont Railroad, and again speculated in several successful business ventures, including timber and mines. He also established a second residence in New York City. He served in the Vermont House of Representatives from 1865 to 1869. In 1868 he was a Vermont delegate to the Republican National Convention that nominated Ulysses S. Grant for president and Schuyler Colfax for vice president. The same year, he was elected as Vermont's member of the Republican National Committee, serving until 1870.

In 1870 he was one of the founders of Rutland, Vermont's Baxter National Bank, and he often continued to invest in partnership with the bank's president, Horace Henry Baxter. In 1871 Park's daughter Eliza married John G. McCullough, former Attorney General of California, who became active in several of Park's business ventures and later served as Governor of Vermont. Also in 1871, Park was an owner and promoter of the supposedly depleted Utah Emma Silver Mine. English citizens invested millions of pounds, and in 1876 and 1877 his partners and he were accused of defrauding the group that purchased the mine. Park and his associates were acquitted in a nationally publicized April 1877 trial.

Park was a candidate for the 1874 Republican nomination for Governor, but withdrew in favor of the eventual nominee and general election winner, state Supreme Court Justice Asahel Peck. The same year, Park purchased controlling interest in the Panama Railway and was elected its president, succeeding Russell Sage. During the rest of the 1870s he engaged in a well-publicized contest with rival financier Jay Gould for control of Pacific Mail, the company that shipped cargo between the eastern and western United States by moving it overland across the Isthmus of Panama. In 1881, Park sold his stock in the Panama railroad for $7 million (over $200 million in 2022).

Active in civic affairs, Park was a member of the committee that oversaw design and construction of the Bennington Battle Monument, and was a trustee of the University of Vermont. His philanthropic donations included the Bennington Free Library (with Seth B. Hunt), and the building and land for the Vermont Soldiers' Home (again in conjunction with the Hunt family). He also donated the University of Vermont's Park Gallery of Art, the exhibits of which were later incorporated into the university's Robert Hull Fleming Museum.

== Death and burial ==
Trenor Park died on December 13, 1882, while aboard the ship San Blas between New York and Aspinwall, Panama while en route to San Francisco. His funeral took place at New York City's Collegiate Reformed Church, and he was buried in Brooklyn's Green-Wood Cemetery. Park was later re-interred at Bennington's Old Cemetery.

== Legacy ==
His Bennington home, the Park-McCullough House, was added to the National Register of Historic Places in 1972 and is open to the public.

== Trenor Luther Park ==
Trenor Luther Park (1861–1907) studied at Harvard University and was a successful businessman, yachtsman and golfer. He was married to Julia Hunt Catlin (1864–1947). Trenor L. Park died during surgery for an intestinal ailment, and his friends and family believed his decline had been hastened by despondence over the death of his nine-year-old daughter Elliot, who had been killed in an accident earlier that year.

== Laura Hall Park ==
Laura Hall Park (1858–1939) married Frederic Beach Jennings (1853–1920), a Bennington and New York City lawyer and businessman. They donated the site of their Vermont home to become the location of Bennington College.

== Sources ==
- The Hoosac Valley: Its Legends and its History, by Grace Greylock Niles, 1912, page 464
- Trenor Park: A New Englander in California, by Virginia Bell, California Historical Society, 1981,
- Biography of Trenor W. Park, History of Bennington County, Vermont, edited by Lewis Cass Aldrich, 1889
- Proceedings of the First Three Republican National Conventions of 1856, 1860 and 1864, published by Charles W. Johnson, Minneapolis, 1893, page 248
- National Register of Historic Places web site, Vermont state listings,
- Genealogical and Family History of the State of Vermont, edited by Hiram Carleton, 1903, Volume II, pages 12 to 14
- Men of Vermont: Illustrated Biographical History of Vermonters & Sons of Vermont, Jacob Ullery, 1894, Transcript Publishing Company, Brattleboro, pages 296 to 298
- Vermont: the Green Mountain State, Walter Hill Crockett, 1921, Volume 4, pages 65 to 66
- One Thousand Men, by Dorman B. E. Kent, published by Vermont Historical Society 1915, page 123
- The Vermont Encyclopedia, by John J. Duffy, Samuel B. Hand, and Ralph H. Orth, 2003, pages 53 to 54, 228
- Letter as Chairman, Republican State Central Committee, Trenor William Park, September 2, 1856, University of California Berkeley archives
- The National Cyclopaedia of American Biography, published by James T. White and Company, 1892, Volume II, page 135
