= Emma Silver Mine =

Silver mine in Utah, United States

The Emma Silver Mine is a currently inactive silver mine near Alta, Utah, in the United States. The mine is most noted for an attempt in 1871 by two American business promoters, including Senator William M. Stewart and James E. Lyon, to make a profit by promoting the depleted silver mine to British investors.

== Origins ==
In the Spring of 1871, promoters Senator William M. Stewart of Nevada, and James E. Lyon from Wisconsin, attempted to sell the "worked-out" Emma Silver Mine at Alta, Utah to British investors. Lyon owned the mine along with Trenor W. Park and Henry H. Baxter at an estimated $1.5 million worth. Stewart had been sending bogus ore samples from other deposits to get people in England excited about buying out the Emma mine. Stewart claimed that the mine could be sold for $5 to 8 million in England. As a reward for Stewart's effort he was to receive a percentage of the profits from the sale of the depleted silver mine.

== British investment ==
To get the people of England to invest, Stewart and Park got U.S. ambassador, Robert C. Schenck, a Grant appointee, to be named on the director’s list. Schenck gave his name and reputation to get English people to invest in the phony mine in exchange for shares in the company. Many British speculators invested millions of pounds in the exhausted mine. Secretary of State Hamilton Fish and Grant discovered the indiscretion and advised Schenck on November 21, 1871 to drop his name from the mine. Schenck did so on December 6, however he delayed severing his name with the mine until January 12, 1872, time enough for himself and other investors to sell their shares at a profit. The mine was sold to English investors for a sum of $5 million. The scandal was exposed by a U.S. Congressional investigation in 1876 led by the Democratic Party. Schenck was reprimanded by the House investigation committee, but not charged with any crimes.
