= Benjamin Douglas =

American politician

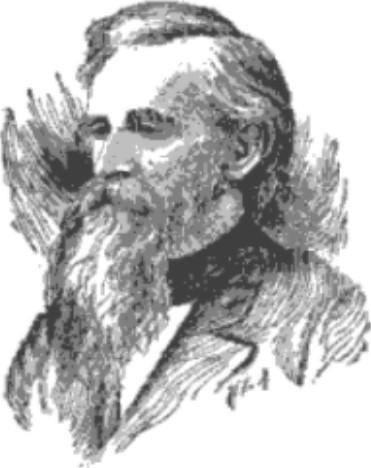

Lieutenant Governor of Connecticut
- In office 1861–1862

Personal details
- Born: April 3, 1816 Northford, Connecticut
- Died: June 26, 1894 (aged 78) Middletown, Connecticut
- Political party: Republican
- Occupation: Businessman, politician

Benjamin Douglas (April 3, 1816 – June 26, 1894) was an American politician, inventor, and abolitionist who was the 50th lieutenant governor of Connecticut from 1861 to 1862.

== Family ==
Douglas was born in Northford, Connecticut, on April 3, 1816. His paternal grandfather was an American Revolutionary War soldier, William Douglas. His first sixteen years were spent working on his parents' farm. In 1838 he married Mary Adaline Parker (born 1821), daughter of Elias and Grace Mansfield Parker. The following year his brother William married Mary's sister Grace. In 1850 he bought the former home of Thomas Mather, a Middletown businessman, on Maine Street in Middletown. This home, built between 1811 and 1813, is listed on the Connecticut Freedom Trail as an Underground Railroad stop.

He had five children: John Mansfield (born 1839), Sarah Kirtland (born 1841), Benjamin (born 1843), William (born 1845), Benjamin (born 1849), and Edward (1854-1889).

== Invention ==
In 1832 Douglas apprenticed to a machinist. Following his apprenticeship, and together with his brother William, he founded a machine shop and foundry in 1839. In 1842 his brother and he patented a hand pump design for use in farms, homes, and businesses. This was the first of many patents relating to pumps that became the basis of their successful manufacturing business W & B Douglas Company.

They also made fire hydrants and hand fire pumpers. Their Middletown pump works occupied two acres and consisted of twenty one buildings. In 1876 the company employed 300 people and had over 700 products displayed at Centennial Exhibition in Philadelphia. The factory closed around 1923, and the buildings were razed in 1940. Many of their pumps remain in operation today.

== Political career ==
As an adult, Douglas lived in Middletown, Middlesex County, Connecticut. He was a Republican and served in the state general assembly for several years. He was mayor of Middletown from 1850 to 1853. He was a delegate to the Republican National Convention from Connecticut in 1856 and cast his vote for Abraham Lincoln. Later, he was the lieutenant governor of Connecticut for a single one-year term, from 1861 to 1862, during one of the eight years that William A. Buckingham was governor of Connecticut. Douglas succeeded Julius Catlin as lieutenant governor and his successor was Roger Averill, both of whom also served when Buckingham was governor.

== Abolition ==
Benjamin Douglas was a founding member of the Middletown Anti-Slavery Society. In 1839 he was one of eleven members and the group met at his factory. His home is believed to have been a stop on the Underground Railroad in Middletown. During his time as mayor of Middletown, he refused to comply with the 1850 Fugitive Slave Act.

== Death ==
Douglas died at his home in Middletown on June 26, 1894.

== See also ==
- List of governors of Connecticut

Political offices
Preceded by Julius Catlin	Lieutenant Governor of Connecticut; 1861–1862	Succeeded by Roger Averill
