= Ridleys Ferry, California =

Former settlement in California, US

Coordinates: 37.6097°N 120.1358°W

Ridleys Ferry, later Benton Mills, is a former settlement in Mariposa County, California, United States.

It was located on the south bank of the Merced River, opposite the settlement of Bagby.

== History ==
It was on the Rancho Las Mariposas, an 1844 Mexican land grant acquired in 1847 by John C. Frémont. During the California Gold Rush Frémont built a stamp mill at Ridleys Ferry, and renamed it Benton Mills in honor of his father-in-law Senator Thomas Hart Benton.

Thomas E. Ridley operated a ferry across the Merced River at the site from 1850 to 1852.

The settlement endured during the 1850s and 1860s.

== See also ==
- List of ghost towns in California
