= Woodford, Vermont =

- Town
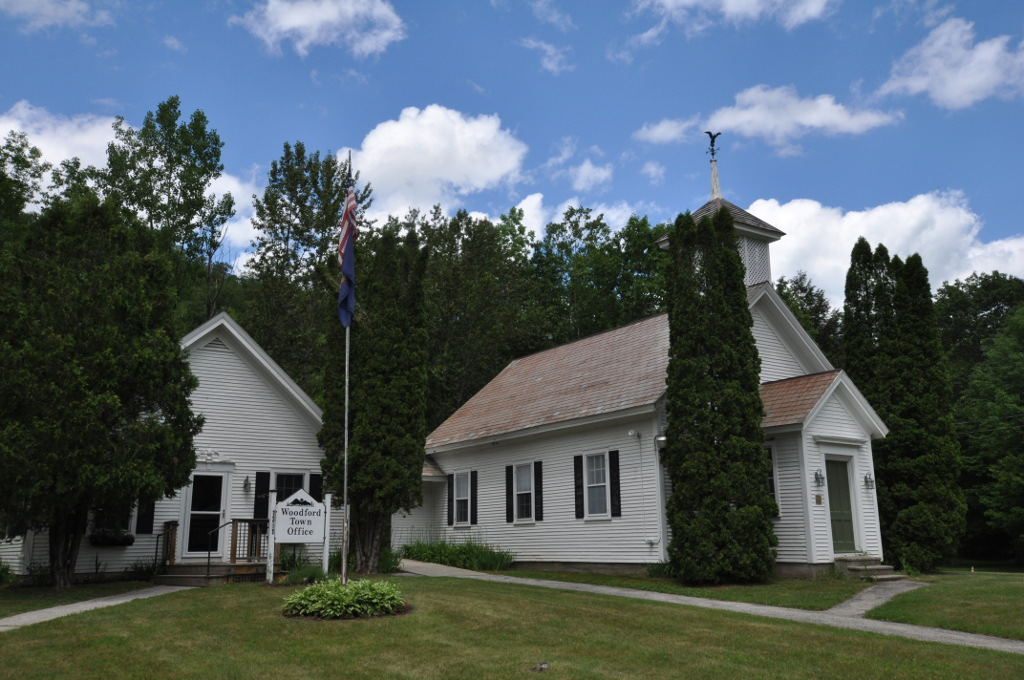
- Woodford Town Hall

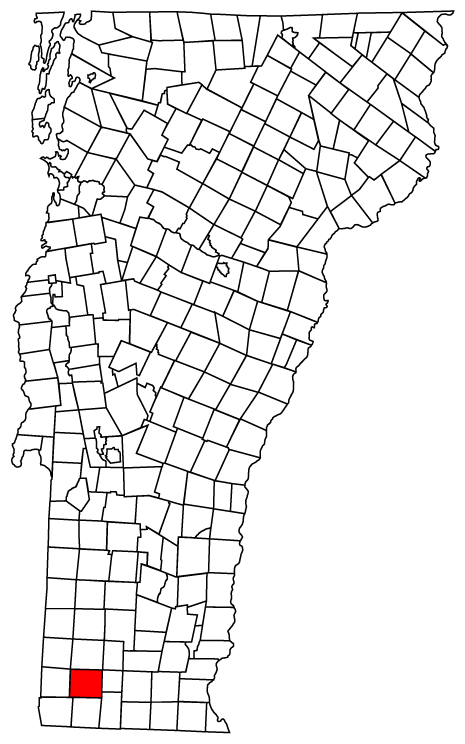
- Woodford, Vermont
- Coordinates: 42°52′50″N 73°06′15″W
- Country: United States
- State: Vermont
- County: Bennington
- Communities: Woodford; Woodford Hollow

Area
  - Total: 47.6 sq mi (123.3 km^{2})
  - Land: 47.4 sq mi (122.8 km^{2})
  - Water: 0.15 sq mi (0.4 km^{2})
- Elevation: 2,238 ft (682 m)

Population (2020)
  - Total: 355
  - Density: 9.1/sq mi (3.5/km^{2})
- Time zone: UTC-5 (Eastern (EST))
  - Summer (DST): UTC-4 (EDT)
- ZIP code: 05201
- Area code: 802
- FIPS code: 50-85675
- GNIS feature ID: 1462271
- Website: woodfordvt.org

Woodford is a town in Bennington County, Vermont, United States. As of the 2020 census, the population was 355.

== Geography ==
Woodford is located in southern Bennington County, directly east of the town of Bennington. Woodford is on the crest of the Green Mountains: the western half of the town drains into the Walloomsac River of Bennington, then west to the Hudson River, while the eastern half of the town drains to the Deerfield River, a tributary of the Connecticut River.

According to the United States Census Bureau, the town has a total area of 47.6 square miles (123.3 km^{2}), of which 47.4 square miles (122.8 km^{2}) is land and 0.15 square miles (0.4 km^{2}), or 0.35%, is water.

== Demographics ==
Historical population
Census	Pop.	Note	%±
1790	60		—
1800	138		130.0%
1810	254		84.1%
1820	212		−16.5%
1830	395		86.3%
1840	487		23.3%
1850	423		−13.1%
1860	379		−10.4%
1870	371		−2.1%
1880	487		31.3%
1890	353		−27.5%
1900	279		−21.0%
1910	187		−33.0%
1920	231		23.5%
1930	139		−39.8%
1940	170		22.3%
1950	198		16.5%
1960	207		4.5%
1970	286		38.2%
1980	314		9.8%
1990	331		5.4%
2000	414		25.1%
2010	424		2.4%
2020	355		−16.3%
U.S. Decennial Census

As of the census of 2000, there were 414 people, 172 households, and 115 families residing in the town. The population density was 8.7 people per square mile (3.4/km^{2}). There were 334 housing units at an average density of 7.0 per square mile (2.7/km^{2}). The racial makeup of the town was 98.31% White, 0.24% Asian, 0.72% from other races, and 0.72% from two or more races. Hispanic or Latino of any race were 0.24% of the population.

There were 172 households, out of which 29.7% had children under the age of 18 living with them, 52.9% were married couples living together, 9.9% had a female householder with no husband present, and 33.1% were non-families. 22.1% of all households were made up of individuals, and 6.4% had someone living alone who was 65 years of age or older. The average household size was 2.41 and the average family size was 2.85.

In the town, the population was spread out, with 21.7% under the age of 18, 8.2% from 18 to 24, 31.6% from 25 to 44, 27.8% from 45 to 64, and 10.6% who were 65 years of age or older. The median age was 40 years. For every 100 females, there were 102.0 males. For every 100 females age 18 and over, there were 100.0 males.

The median income for a household in the town was $33,929, and the median income for a family was $36,944. Males had a median income of $29,063 versus $24,688 for females. The per capita income for the town was $17,752. About 11.0% of families and 16.6% of the population were below the poverty line, including 26.3% of those under age 18 and none of those age 65 or over.

== Notable people ==
- Franklin W. Olin, founder of Olin Industries, and benefactor of the Franklin W. Olin College of Engineering
- Trenor W. Park, attorney, businessman, and politician
