= Halleck, Peachy & Billings =

San Francisco law firm

- Headquarters: San Francisco, California
- No. of offices: 1
- Major practice areas: Land cases
- Date founded: 1849
- Dissolved: 1861

Halleck, Peachy & Billings was one of the leading early law firms in San Francisco, California and specialized in land cases. The firm was organized by Frederick H. Billings and Archibald Carey Peachy in 1849, who were joined soon after by Henry Wager Halleck. Halleck, Peachy & Billings was employed by claimants in the settlement of titles to Mexican land grants. The firm dissolved in 1861 after Halleck returned to military life and left California.

== History ==
The firm handled more than half of the land claim cases in California immediately following the enaction of the Land Act of 1851. Although Halleck wrote the land title report that helped draft the Land Act of 1851, he did not support the Land Commission, and the firm of Halleck, Peachy & Billings defended many land titles against the Commission. It has been said that Halleck handled the preparation of the briefs for the cases, Peachy the oratory, and that Billings brought in the business. In 1853 Halleck built the Montgomery Block in San Francisco, and the partnership became permanently located there. The firm was dissolved in 1861.

== Principals ==
=== Halleck ===
Halleck (1815–1872) was an engineering graduate of West Point. When the Mexican–American War began in 1846, Halleck was ordered to California. In 1848 Halleck wrote a report on land titles which was based on land grant settlements made by the United States in Florida. Having studied law in his leisure time, resigned from the army in 1854, and joined two other attorneys of a major San Francisco law partnership, renamed Halleck, Peachy & Billings. He wrote two legal works acknowledged to be leading texts in their time - Mining Laws of Spain and Mexico and International Law. In 1861, four months into the American Civil War, Halleck was appointed to the rank of major general in the Union Army and left California.

=== Peachy ===
Archibald Carey Peachy (1820–1883) was a native of Virginia who came to California in 1849. On the trip, Peachy met Frederick Billings, and soon after their arrival in San Francisco they formed a partnership as Peachy & Billings. Peachy was a member of the California Assembly in 1852, and of the California State Senate in 1860 and 1862.

=== Billings ===
Frederick Billings (1823–1890) graduated at the University of Vermont in 1844, and was admitted to the bar in 1848. In 1849, he was appointed legal advisor of California Territory under Governor Mason. At this time he became acquainted with Henry W. Halleck. In the spring of 1849 Billings began the practice of law in San Francisco. In 1863 Billings was an important political figure and was credited by some with saving the state of California for the Union. After returning to Vermont in 1866, Billings reorganized the troubled Northern Pacific Railroad and was elected its president in 1879.

=== Park ===
Trenor W. Park (1823–1882) of Vermont, came to California in 1852, where his father-in-law Hiland Hall had been appointed to the chairmanship of the United States Land Commission of California, by President Fillmore in 1851. Soon after arriving in San Francisco, Park commenced the practice of law, and was invited to join the law firm of Halleck, Peachy & Billings, which became Halleck, Peachy, Billings & Park.
