= XXII Corps (Union army) =

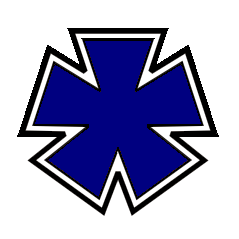
- Badge of the 3rd Division of the XXII Corps
- Active: February 2, 1863 – June 26, 1865
- Country: United States of America
- Branch: Union Army
- Type: Infantry and Cavalry
- Size: Corps
- Part of: Department of Washington
- Colors: White background, red badge (1st Division); Blue background, white badge (2nd Division); White background, blue badge (3rd Division)
- Engagements: Eastern Theater: • Valley Campaigns of 1864 • Battle of Fort Stevens • Skirmishes with Mosby's Rangers

Commanders
- First Commander: Major General Samuel P. Heintzelman
- Second Commander: Major General Christopher C. Augur
- Third Commander: Major General John G. Parke

XXII Corps was a corps in the Union army during the American Civil War. It was created on February 2, 1863, to consist of all troops garrisoned in Washington, D.C., and included three infantry divisions and one of cavalry (under Judson Kilpatrick, which left to join the Army of the Potomac during the Gettysburg campaign). Many of its units were transferred to the Army of the Potomac during Grant's Overland Campaign.

This Corps did not include the many regiments that passed through Washington, D.C., on the way to the front or away from it. Nor does it include the many regiments from the Army of the Potomac, Army of Georgia, and Army of the Tennessee that encamped in the area to participate in the Grand Review of the Armies.

== History ==
Civil War Armies at the time took their name from the Department that it was born out of. This is the reason for the naming of the Army of the Potomac, born out of the Department of the Potomac. At the time of the war, the Union named most of its departments, and thus its armies, after naturally occurring landmarks, specifically water courses, i.e. The Army of the Potomac, The Army of the James, The Army of the Gulf, etc. In opposition, the Confederacy named most of their Armies for geographic areas and states.

=== Department of the East ===
Comprising all of the United States east of the Mississippi River, about half of which became Confederate territory. Formed on January 1, 1861, there were many Departments formed within its borders, and finally destablished August 17, 1861. Its primary focus was to employ a chain of command to all units until the smaller departments could be formed. Headquartered in Albany, New York, it was commanded by Major General John E. Wool.

=== Department of Washington, D.C. ===
Constituted April 9, 1861, to include Washington, D.C., to its original boundaries of Arlington, Virginia, and the state of Maryland as far as Bladensburg. It was formed to center on the defense of the national capital, and to differentiate it from the Department of the East. The department was commanded by Lieutenant Colonel Charles F. Smith from April 10 through April 28, 1861, and Colonel (later Brigadier General) Joseph K. Mansfield from April 28, 1861, through the Department's dissolution on July 25, 1861.

=== Army of the Potomac ===
The Army of the Potomac, formed July 25, 1861, and destablished August 16, 1861, provide for the defense of the city of Washington, D.C. This Department was entrusted with the duty of protecting the United States' capital, with the construction of fortifications. Before the dissolution of the Department of the Potomac, most of the fortifications in the Washington, D.C., area were constructed, mainly by the regiments that were garrisoned there, most of whom had gone on to form the Army of the Potomac. Commanded by Major General George B. McClellan.

=== Military District of Washington ===
A Military District during the Civil War was a formation within a Department for the purpose of reporting directly to the department commander for administrative affairs.

The Military District of Washington was organized June 26, 1862, to include Washington, D.C.; Alexandria, Virginia; and Fort Washington, Maryland. It was a District under the Department of the Potomac. It was incorporated into the Department of the Rappahanock from April 4, 1862, through June 26, 1862, when it again became an independent command. On February 2, 1863, it merged into the Department of Washington. Commanded by Brigadier General James S. Wadsworth.

=== Department of the Rappahannock ===
The Department of the Rappahannock was formed April 4, 1862, from the original I Corps of the Army of the Potomac, to control the area east of the Blue Ridge Mountains to the Potomac River, the Fredericksburg and Richmond Rail Road and the District of Columbia expanded to include the area between the Potomac and Patuxent Rivers. It was merged into the Army of Virginia as III Corps on June 26, 1862, with Major General Irwin McDowell as its commander.

=== Defenses of Washington, D.C. ===
The Defenses of Washington D.C. was a short lived command, from September 2, 1862, through February 2, 1863. used for the consolidation of all the defenses of the area including and surrounding Washington, D.C. Its main focus was on the maintaining of the fortifications in extending in a ring around Washington, D.C.

=== Department of Washington ===
On February 2, 1863, the Department of Washington was re-formed to encompass the area from north of the Potomac from Piscataway Creek to Annapolis Junction (near present-day Fort Meade), west to the Monocacy River, south to the Bull Run Mountains by way of Goose Creek, then east to Occoquan River. The size of it would expand throughout the war to include the entirety of the counties in the surrounding states of Maryland and Virginia.

The Quartermaster Department of the Department of Washington was the largest Quartermaster Department in the Union Army. Duties as varied as building, maintenance of fortifications, supplies, road building, transportation, and ordnance testing as well as many other duties were taken over by the quartermasters of the Washington Department. Washington, D.C., also served as a transship point for supplies and materiel destined to both the Army of the Potomac and Army of the James.

=== XXII Corps ===
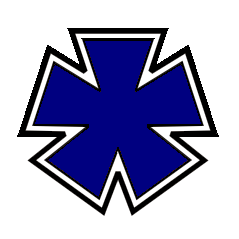
The blue Pentagon Cross served as the badge of the 3rd Division, XXII Corps

A Corps is a grouping of two to six divisions, providing a level of the chain of command typically commanded by a major general. Corps were first created by an Act of Congress on July 17, 1862, but Major General George B. McClellan had instituted them in the spring of 1862. Before this time, the formations were known as either "Wings" or "Grand Divisions". Most Corps came under the operational command of an Army, but the XXII Corps did not.

XXII Corps was formed as a Corps under the Department of Washington on February 2, 1863. As was tradition, its commanders doubled as commanders of the Department of Washington. During its time, many of the regiments that were fought out arrived to reconstitute and would then be transferred back out, most of them from or to the Army of the Potomac.

== Battles ==
=== Mosby's Raids ===
During the time of existence of the 43rd Battalion Virginia Cavalry, better known as Mosby's Rangers, Mosby's Command, or Mosby's Raiders, commanded by Colonel John S. Mosby, made many forays in the area known as Mosby's Confederacy which extended from Loudoun County to Fairfax County. Many of the raids it performed came into the area protected by XXII Corps, and many skirmishes with Brigadier General William Gamble's Cavalry Division, as well as various other XXII Corps units. During its reign, Mosby's Raiders captured Brigadier General Edwin H. Stoughton (then commanding the 2nd Vermont Brigade), cut telegraph wires during Early's Valley Campaign and numerous raids against rail lines and supply stations.

=== Battle of Fort Stevens ===
The corps took part in the defense of Washington during Jubal Early's Washington Raid of 1864, playing a major role in the defense of Fort Stevens on July 11, 1864. Hardin's Division held the skirmish lines and engaged in small engagements, suffering 73 killed and wounded. The following day, Early found the works held by veteran soldiers of Major General Horatio Wright's VI Corps and Brevet Brigadier General William Emory's XIX Corps. After making a small fight, Early would withdraw, crossing back into Virginia the next day.

== Command history ==
Major General Samuel P. Heintzelman	February 2, 1863 – October 13, 1863
Major General Christopher C. Augur	October 13, 1863 – June 11, 1865
Major General John G. Parke	June 7, 1865 – June 26, 1865

== Notable officers ==
Name	Unit	Dates Served
Major General John G. Barnard	Chief Engineer, Department of Washington	July 1, 1862 — June 5, 1864
Major General Silas Casey	Commanded Casey's Division (Provisional Brigade) and served as an administrative officer	June 1862 — May 1863
Maj. Gen. George B. McClellan	Commanded Department of the Potomac	July 25, 1861 — August 16, 1861
Major General Montgomery C. Meigs	Quartermaster General of the Union Army and commander of War Department clerks during the Battle of Fort Stevens	May 15, 1861 — June 30, 1865
Brigadier General John Joseph Abercrombie	Commanded Abercrombie's Division	October 1862 — June 26, 1863
Brigadier General Barton S. Alexander	Chief Engineer of the Defenses of Washington, D.C.	July 1, 1862 — April 7, 1863
Brigadier General Robert Cowdin	Commanded 1st and 2nd Brigade, Abercrombie's Division	October, 1862 — March 30, 1863
Brigadier General Gustavus Adolphus DeRussy	Commander of DeRussy's Division, stationed south of Washington, D.C.	May 25, 1863 — August 20, 1865
Brigadier General Martin Davis Hardin	Commander of Haskin's Division, stationed north of Washington, D.C.	July 8, 1864 — August 2, 1865
Brigadier General Joseph Abel Haskin	Commander of Haskin's Division, stationed north of Washington, D.C., later Chief of Artillery	February 2, 1863 — April 10, 1866
Brigadier General William Gamble	Commanded Cavalry Division	December 21, 1863 — July 17, 1865
Brigadier General Rufus King	Commanded King's Division	July 15, 1863 — October 20, 1863
Brigadier General Joseph K. Mansfield	Commanded the original Department of Washington	April 28, 1861 — March 15, 1862
Brigadier General Edwin H. Stoughton	Commander, 2nd Vermont Brigade	December 7, 1862 — March 9, 1863
Colonel John Baillie McIntosh	Commander of Cavalry Division	January 2, 1864 — May 2, 1864
Chief Aeronaut Thaddeus S. C. Lowe	Commander of the Union Army Balloon Corps	October 1861 — August 1863

== Components of XXII Corps ==
Many Regiments and Brigades serving in the XXII Corps were only temporarily assigned to it. Some mainly served during times when they were reconstituting due to battle casualties, while others were trained in the vicinity of Washington before going into the field. Yet others were heavy artillery regiments assigned to the fortifications surrounding the capital. Many units, including heavy artillery regiments, left when more soldiers were needed during Grant's Overland Campaign and continued through the Richmond-Petersburg Campaign until the end of the war. Some units began serving before the XXII Corps was formed.

=== Famed Brigades in XXII Corps ===
The California Brigade was formed by Oregon Senator and Colonel Edwin Baker to have a California presence in the Eastern Theater. After the death of Colonel Baker at the Battle of Ball's Bluff, the brigade was redesignated the Philadelphia Brigade. Made up of the 1st, 2nd, 3rd, and 5th California Infantry. After redesignation as the Philadelphia Brigade, it consisted of the 69th, 71st, 72nd, and 106th Pennsylvania Infantry.

The First New Jersey Brigade was a Brigade formed by the state of New Jersey while defending Washington, D.C. This was the first brigade in the Civil War to be formed with the intention of encompassing regiments from one state. It consisted of the 1st, 2nd, 3rd, 4th, and 10th New Jersey Infantry. By the end of the war, at different it would have up to eight New Jersey regiments.

The Pennsylvania Reserve Division was formed out of an overflow of volunteers over the amount requested by the Department of War. After the Secretary of War declined to accept the new units into Federal Service, they were formed, equipped and maintained by the State of Pennsylvania. During its service in Washington, D.C., it was composed of the 3rd, 4th, and 8th Pennsylvania Reserves.

Vermont gave two brigades to the defenses of Washington, D.C. The 1st Vermont Brigade, composed of the 2nd, 3rd, 4th, and 6th Vermont Infantry. It was brigaded together through the efforts of Colonel William F. "Baldy" Smith who went to his West Point classmate and friend, Major General George B. McClellan.

The 2nd Vermont Brigade, composed of 12th, 13th, 14th, 15th, and 16th Vermont Infantry, all nine-month regiments, was formed October 27, 1862.

The Iron Brigade was the only named brigade to come from varied states, the 2nd, 6th, and 7th Wisconsin Infantry, along with the 19th Indiana Infantry and was formed on October 1, 1861. Although at the time, it wasn't known by this name, simply known as 3rd Brigade, I Corps. It wouldn't earn the moniker for almost a year, during the Battle of South Mountain during the Antietam Campaign.

=== Connecticut ===
Unit	Duration	Destination
1st Connecticut Cavalry	April 29, 1865 — August 2, 1865	Mustered out
1st Connecticut Heavy Artillery	August 27, 1862 — May 13, 1864	Overland Campaign
2nd Connecticut Heavy Artillery	November 23, 1863 — May 13, 1864	Overland Campaign
2nd Connecticut Heavy Artillery	June 3, 1865 — August 18, 1865	Mustered out
2nd Connecticut Light Artillery	October 15, 1862 — June, 1863	Gettysburg campaign
2nd Connecticut Light Artillery	October 12, 1863 — January, 1864	Transfer to New Orleans, Louisiana
5th Connecticut Infantry	May 20, 1865 — July 19, 1865	Mustered out
14th Connecticut Infantry	May 15, 1865 — May 21, 1865	Mustered out
19th Connecticut Infantry	September 16, 1862 — November 23, 1863	Redesignated 2nd Connecticut Heavy Artillery
22nd Connecticut Infantry	October 3, 1862 — April 14, 1863	Siege of Suffolk
29th Connecticut Infantry (Colored)	April 18, 1865 — May 28, 1865	Transfer to Brownsville, Texas

=== Delaware ===
Unit	Duration	Destination
Nield's Independent Battery Light Artillery	September, 1862 — April 18, 1863	Transfer to Norfolk, Virginia
1st Delaware Infantry	May 12, 1865 - July 12, 1865	Mustered out
3rd Delaware Infantry	May 12, 1865 — June 3, 1865	Mustered out
4th Delaware Infantry	May 12, 1865 — June 3, 1865	Mustered out
8th Delaware Infantry	May 12, 1865 — June 3, 1865	Mustered out

=== District of Columbia ===
Unit	Duration	Destination
1st District of Columbia Cavalry	June, 1863 — January, 1864	Transfer to Yorktown, Virginia
2nd District of Columbia Infantry	September 22, 1862 — September 12, 1865	Mustered out

=== Illinois ===
Unit	Duration	Destination
8th Illinois Cavalry	January 31, 1864 — July 1, 1865	Transfer to Chicago, Illinois, to be mustered out

=== Indiana ===
Unit	Duration	Destination
16th Independent Battery Indiana Light Artillery	October 1, 1862 — June, 1865	Transfer to Indiana to be mustered out
19th Indiana Infantry	August 5, 1861 — March, 1862	Bull Run Campaign (Part of the Iron Brigade)
28th Indiana Infantry (Colored)	April 26, 1864 — July 1, 1864	
63rd Indiana Infantry	May 27, 1862 — August 16, 1862	Bull Run Campaign

=== Maine ===
Unit	Duration	Destination
1st Maine Heavy Artillery	August 25, 1861 — May 15, 1864	Overland Campaign
2nd Maine Light Artillery	November 5, 1863 — April 25, 1864	Overland Campaign
3rd Maine Light Artillery	September, 1862 — July 5, 1864	Richmond-Petersburg Campaign
7th Maine Light Artillery	February 2, 1864 — April 25, 1864	Overland Campaign
15th Maine Infantry	April 23, 1865 — May 31, 1865	Transfer to Savannah, Georgia
23rd Maine Infantry	October 19, 1862 — June 17, 1863	Transfer to Maine to muster out (9 month regiment)
25th Maine infantry	October 18, 1862 — June 30, 1863	Transfer to Maine to muster out (9 month regiment)
27th Maine Infantry	October 20, 1862 — July 4, 1863	Transfer to Maine to muster out (9 month regiment)
31st Maine Infantry	April 19, 1864 — May 3, 1864	Overland Campaign
32nd Maine Infantry	April 21, 1864 — May 3, 1864	Overland Campaign

=== Maryland ===
Unit	Duration	Destination
Battery "D" Maryland Light Artillery	June, 1864 — June 25, 1865	Mustered out
Baltimore Independent Battery Light Artillery	January, 1865 — June 17, 1865	Mustered out

=== Massachusetts ===
Unit	Duration	Destination
2nd Massachusetts Cavalry	July 29, 1863 — July 14, 1864	Pursuit of Early
3rd Massachusetts Cavalry	April 20, 1865 — June 14, 1865	Transfer to St. Louis, Missouri
5th Massachusetts Cavalry	May 8, 1864 — May 12, 1864	Petersburg - Richmond Campaign
5th Massachusetts Cavalry	June 30, 1864 — March, 1865	Transfer to Richmond, Virginia
1st Massachusetts Heavy Artillery	January 1, 1862 — May 15, 1864	Overland Campaign
1st Massachusetts Heavy Artillery	May 23, 1865 — August 17, 1865	Mustered out
3rd Massachusetts Heavy Artillery	August, 1864 — September 18, 1865	Mustered out
4th Massachusetts Heavy Artillery	November 12, 1864 — June 17, 1865	Mustered out
7th Massachusetts Light Artillery	July 22, 1863 — August 18, 1863	New York Draft Riots
7th Massachusetts Light Artillery	September 11, 1863 — January 24, 1864	Transfer to New Orleans, Louisiana
9th Massachusetts Light Artillery	September 4, 1862 — June 25, 1863	Gettysburg campaign
10th Massachusetts Light Artillery	October 17, 1862 — June 24, 1863	Gettysburg campaign
11th Massachusetts Light Artillery	November 4, 1862 — May 25, 1863	Transfer to Boston, Massachusetts, to be mustered out (9 month regiment)
11th Massachusetts Light Artillery (Reorganized)	February 6, 1864 — April 9, 1864	Overland Campaign
16th Massachusetts Light Artillery	April 18, 1864 — July 1, 1865	Transferred to Massachusetts, to be mustered out
40th Massachusetts Volunteer Infantry	September 8, 1862 — April 15, 1863	Transferred with division to Department of Virginia and North Carolina

=== New Hampshire ===
Unit	Duration	Destination
14th New Hampshire Infantry	October, 1862 — March, 1864	

=== New Jersey ===
Unit	Duration	Destination
2nd New Jersey Cavalry	October 25, 1864 — November 9, 1863	
10th New Jersey Infantry	December 26, 1861 — April, 1863	

=== New York ===
Unit	Duration	Destination
9th New York Heavy Artillery	September, 1862 — May 18, 1864	
11th New York Infantry	May 7, 1861 — July 15, 1861	

=== Ohio ===
Unit	Duration	Destination
131st Ohio Infantry (Detachments from)	May 15, 1864 — August 19, 1864	

=== Pennsylvania ===
Unit	Duration	Destination
2nd Pennsylvania Heavy Artillery	February 26, 1862 — May 28, 1864	
5th Pennsylvania Heavy Artillery	September 14, 1864 — June 30, 1865	
6th Pennsylvania Heavy Artillery	September 15, 1864 — June 15, 1865	

=== Vermont ===
Unit	Duration	Destination
10th Vermont Infantry	September 8, 1862 — June 22, 1863	
11th Vermont Infantry	September 22, 1862 — May 15, 1864	
12th Vermont Infantry	October 10, 1862 — June 25, 1863	
13th Vermont Infantry	October 13, 1862 — June 25, 1863	
14th Vermont Infantry	October 25, 1862 — June 25, 1863	
15th Vermont Infantry	October 26, 1862 — June 25, 1863	
16th Vermont Infantry	October 27, 1862 — June 25, 1863	

=== United States Volunteers ===
Unit	Duration	Destination
Veteran Reserve Corps		
1st Battalion, Veteran Reserve Corps		
2nd Battalion, Veteran Reserve Corps		
Union Army Balloon Corps	October, 1861 — August, 1863	

== See also ==
- Washington, D.C., in the American Civil War
- List of corps of the United States
- Lists of American Civil War Regiments by State
- Baltimore riot of 1861
- First Bull Run Union order of battle
- Field artillery in the American Civil War
- Siege artillery in the American Civil War
- Infantry in the American Civil War
- Military leadership in the American Civil War#The Union
- Habeas corpus#Suspension during the Civil War and Reconstruction
