= Vermont in the American Civil War =

During the American Civil War, the State of Vermont gave strong support to the Union war effort, raising troops and money. According to Rachel Cree Sherman:

By the spring of 1865 Vermont was devastated, having sent one tenth of its entire population to war, with a loss of over 5,000 lives to battle, wounds, and disease. The state had dedicated nearly $10 million to support the conflict, half of that amount offered up by towns with no expectation of recompense.

== Background ==
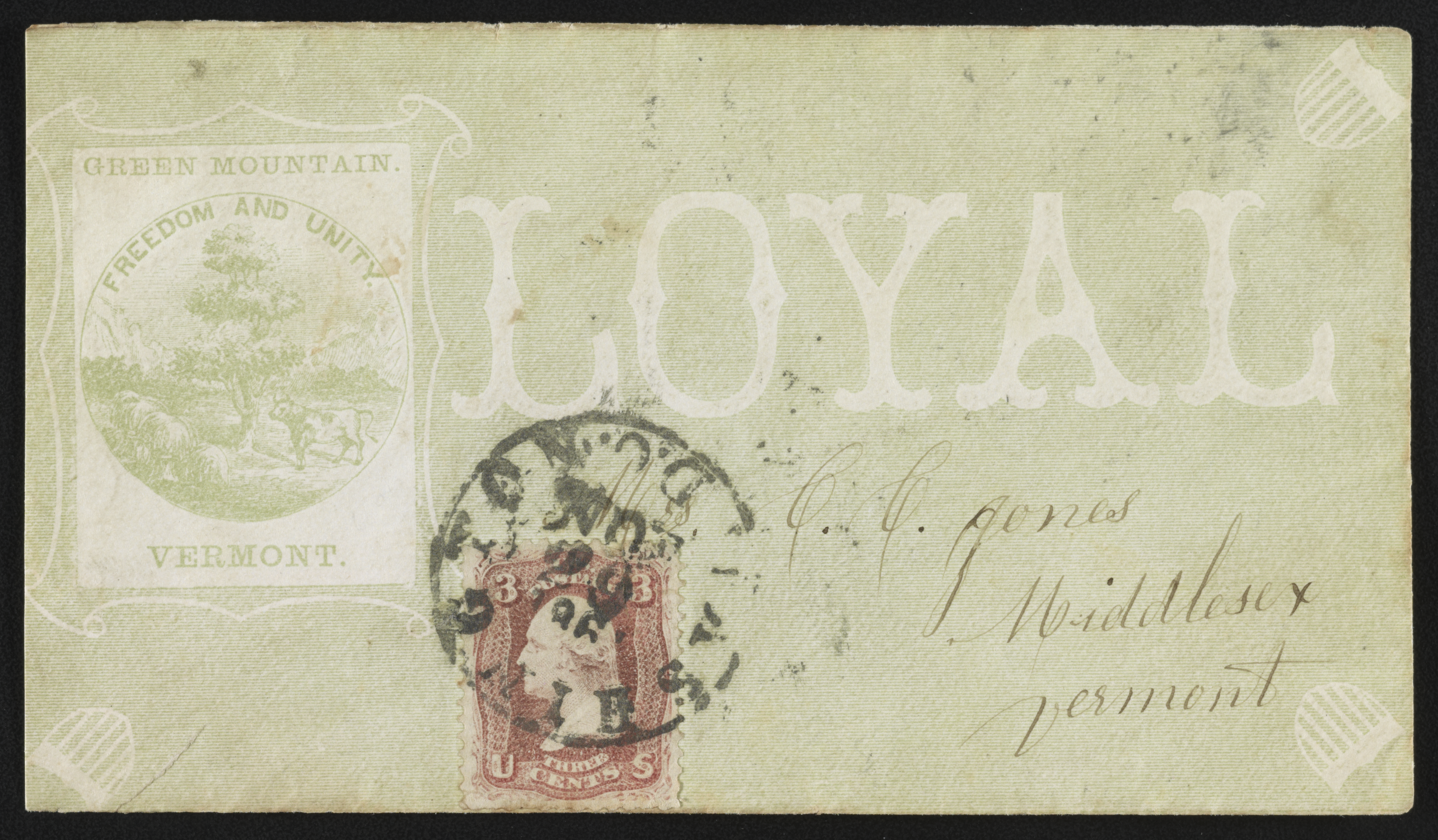
Civil War envelope showing Vermont state seal with message "Loyal"

The second article in Vermont's constitution, originally written in 1777, abolished slavery, making it the first state to do so. Although its climate was not conducive to the slave trade, Vermonters were early participants in the abolitionist movement. In the 1860 presidential election, Vermont gave Republican Abraham Lincoln a lopsided victory, 33,808 votes compared to 8,649 for Stephen Douglas, 1,866 for John Bell, and 217 for John C. Breckinridge. Lincoln would win 75.86% of the vote in the state, making Vermont his strongest victory in popular vote percentage. One historian opined that the heavy rain on election day "reduced the Republican majority by at least 7,000" votes.

In the closing days of 1860, in response to a pro-Southern resolution by Representative Albert Rust of Arkansas, Vermont Representative Justin S. Morrill offered an amendment, "Resolved, That in the opinion of this committee, the existing discontent among the Southern people and the growing hostility to the Federal Government, are greatly to be regretted, and that any reasonable, proper and constitutional remedy necessary to preserve the peace of the country, and the perpetuity of the Union, should be promptly and cheerfully grant." His amendment was rejected by a large majority, and Congress and the Union continued its downward spiral toward disunion.

Lawyer Lucius E. Chittenden served on the ill-fated Peace conference of 1861 and later as Registrar of the Treasury in the Lincoln administration. Vermont politicians in Congress included Senators Solomon Foot and Jacob Collamer and Representatives Justin S. Morrill, Homer Elihu Royce and Portus Baxter.

During the war, three men served as Governor of Vermont; Erastus Fairbanks, Frederick Holbrook and J. Gregory Smith. Fairbanks reportedly responded to the Federal Government's response for troops with "Vermont will do its Full Duty." Under his administration, Vermont fielded six infantry and one cavalry regiments. Governor Holbrook's administration saw the recruitment of 10 infantry regiments, 2 light artillery batteries, and 3 sharpshooter companies. Under his administration, as well, Vermont built three military hospitals in the state which were "soon credited by the United States medical inspector with perfecting a larger percentage of cures than any United States military hospital record elsewhere could show." Governor Smith oversaw the recruitment of Vermont's last infantry regiment, a third light artillery battery, and, as a result of a Confederate raid on his hometown, St. Albans, two companies of frontier cavalry.

== Military enrollment ==
The state sent more than 34,000 to serve, out of a total population of about 350,000 citizens. More than 28,100 Vermonters served in Vermont volunteer units. Vermont fielded 17 infantry regiments, 1 cavalry regiment, 3 light artillery batteries, 1 heavy artillery company, 3 companies of sharpshooters, and 2 companies of frontier cavalry. Instead of replacing units as they were depleted, Vermont regularly provided recruits to bring the units in the field back up to normal strength. With the nation's oldest senior military college, Norwich University, located in Vermont, the state provided the Union with numerous officers.

Nearly 5,000 others served in other states' units, in the United States Army or the United States Navy. The 54th Massachusetts Volunteer Infantry included 66 black people from Vermont; a total of 166 black Vermonters served out of a population of 709 in the state.

Vermonters suffered a total of 1,832 men killed or mortally wounded in battle; another 3,362 died of disease, in prison or from other causes, for a total loss of 5,194. More than 2,200 Vermonters were taken prisoner during the war, and 615 of them died in or as a result of their imprisonment.

Historian Howard Coffin claimed that the state's most important contribution to the war was at the Battle of the Wilderness where the Vermont Brigade held the crucial intersection of two roads, the loss of which would have split the Union forces in half. 1,200 Vermonters died. They also played a crucial role at the Battle of Gettysburg, where, under General George J. Stannard, the 2nd Vermont Brigade broke Pickett's charge by stepping out of a protected area and firing at the flank of the attackers.

General Winfield Scott, learning that a regiment of Green Mountain Boys (the 1st Vermont Infantry) was awaiting orders, said "I want your Vermont regiments, all of them. I have not forgotten the Vermont men on the Niagara frontier... I remember the Vermont men in the War of 1812."

A significant number of generals hailed from Vermont. Several led Vermont units, including Lewis A. Grant, John W. Phelps, William Farrar Smith, George J. Stannard, Edwin H. Stoughton, Stephen Thomas, James M. Warner, and William Wells. Others served in other states' units or in the Regular Army, including Benjamin Alvord, John C. Caldwell, Sylvester Churchill, Joel Dewey, Charles Doolittle, William B. Hazen, Ethan Allen Hitchcock, Charles Edward Hovey, Joseph A. Mower, Thomas E. G. Ransom, Israel B. Richardson, Benjamin S. Roberts, Truman Seymour, George Crockett Strong, Stewart Van Vliet, and George Wright. Six Vermonters became brevet brigadier general, including Asa P. Blunt, George P. Foster, William W. Henry, John R. Lewis, Edward H. Ripley and Charles B. Stoughton.

One native Vermonter, Chester A. Arthur, who later became President of the United States, served as Adjutant General of the State of New York during the war. Some notable Vermont sailors include George Dewey, Charles Edgar Clark, George F. Emmons, George Colvocoresses, Theodore P. Greene, Edward D. Robie, and Edwin T. Woodward.

== Service ==
The first military action seen by Vermonters was at the Battle of Big Bethel on June 10, 1861, where a battalion of the 1st Vermont Infantry was engaged.

The 2nd, 3rd, 4th, 5th, 6th, and later the 11th Vermont Infantry regiments served in the 1st Vermont Brigade, which saw action in nearly every major engagement in the Eastern Theater from the First Battle of Bull Run to Appomattox Court House.

The 7th Vermont Infantry, 8th Vermont Infantry, and two Vermont Light Artillery Batteries served in the Department of the Gulf under Benjamin F. Butler. The 8th Vermont later saw service in the Shenandoah Valley Campaigns of 1864.

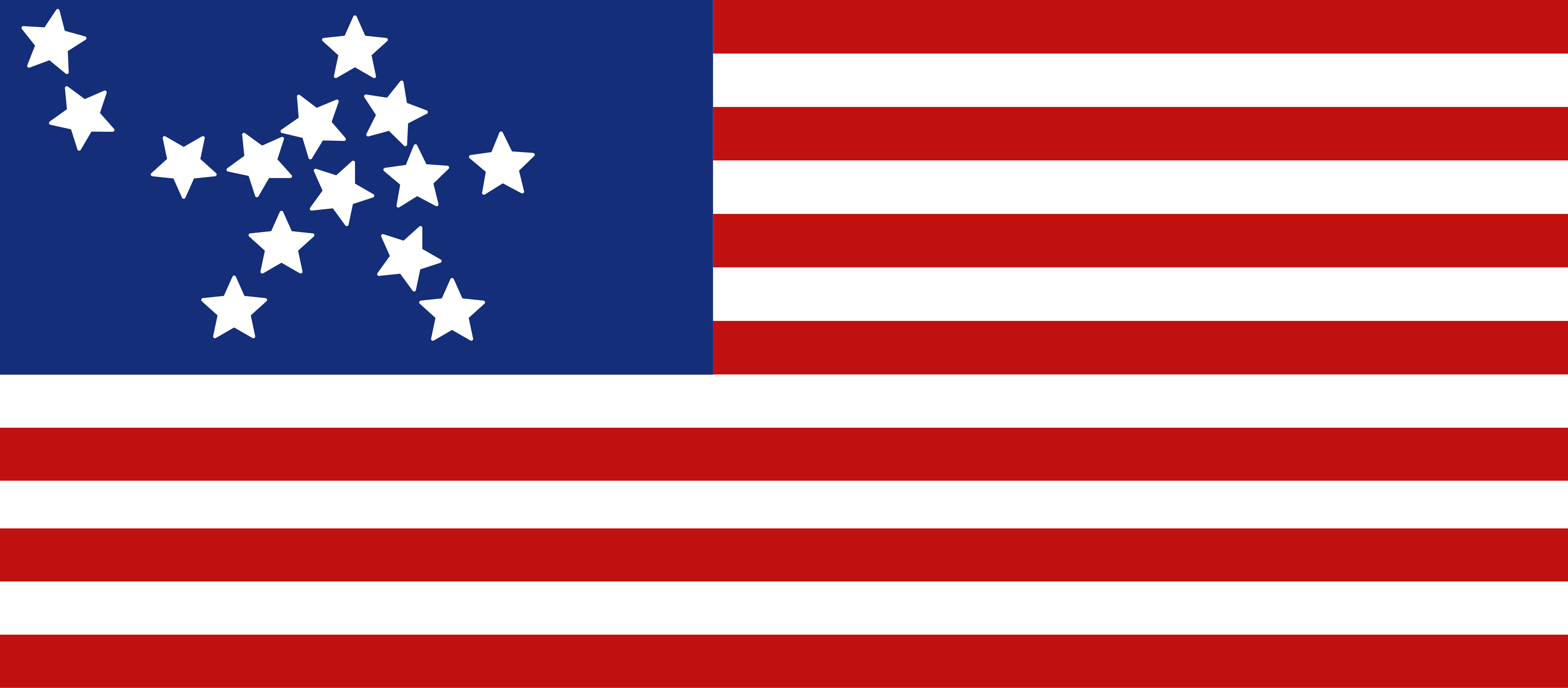
Digital remake of one of the American flags carried by Vermont troops

The 9th Vermont Infantry suffered capture at the Battle of Harpers Ferry during the 1862 Maryland Campaign, but later fought well with the VII, XVIII and XXIV Corps in eastern Virginia and North Carolina, and was one of the first units to enter Richmond, Virginia, in April 1865.

The 10th Vermont Infantry gained its niche in history at the Battle of Monocacy, an important but often overlooked battle that delayed a Confederate drive on Washington D.C.

At Gettysburg on the first day of battle, July 1, 1863, General John Sedgwick is quoted as saying, "Put the Vermonters ahead and keep the column well closed up." The 12th, 13th, 14th, 15th, and 16th Vermont Infantry regiments were banded together as the 2nd Vermont Brigade, which gained lasting credit for its actions in helping stop Pickett's Charge on July 3, 1863, during the Battle of Gettysburg.

At the Battle of the Wilderness, Vermont experienced its worst day of the war; 1,000 men were killed or wounded from the 1st Vermont Brigade alone. One in eight of the casualties resulting in the battle was by this brigade, which was one of 32 brigades on the Union side.

Vermont fielded three companies of sharpshooters, which served with Hiram Berdan in the two U.S. Sharpshooter regiments.

The 1st Vermont Cavalry regiment participated in more than 70 engagements.

After the St. Albans raid on October 19, 1864, Vermont fielded two companies of Frontier Cavalry, who spent six months on the Canada–US border to prevent further incursions from Confederate raiders.

Sixty-four Vermonters received the Medal of Honor, including Willie Johnston, the youngest person ever to receive the award.

== Civil War sites in Vermont ==
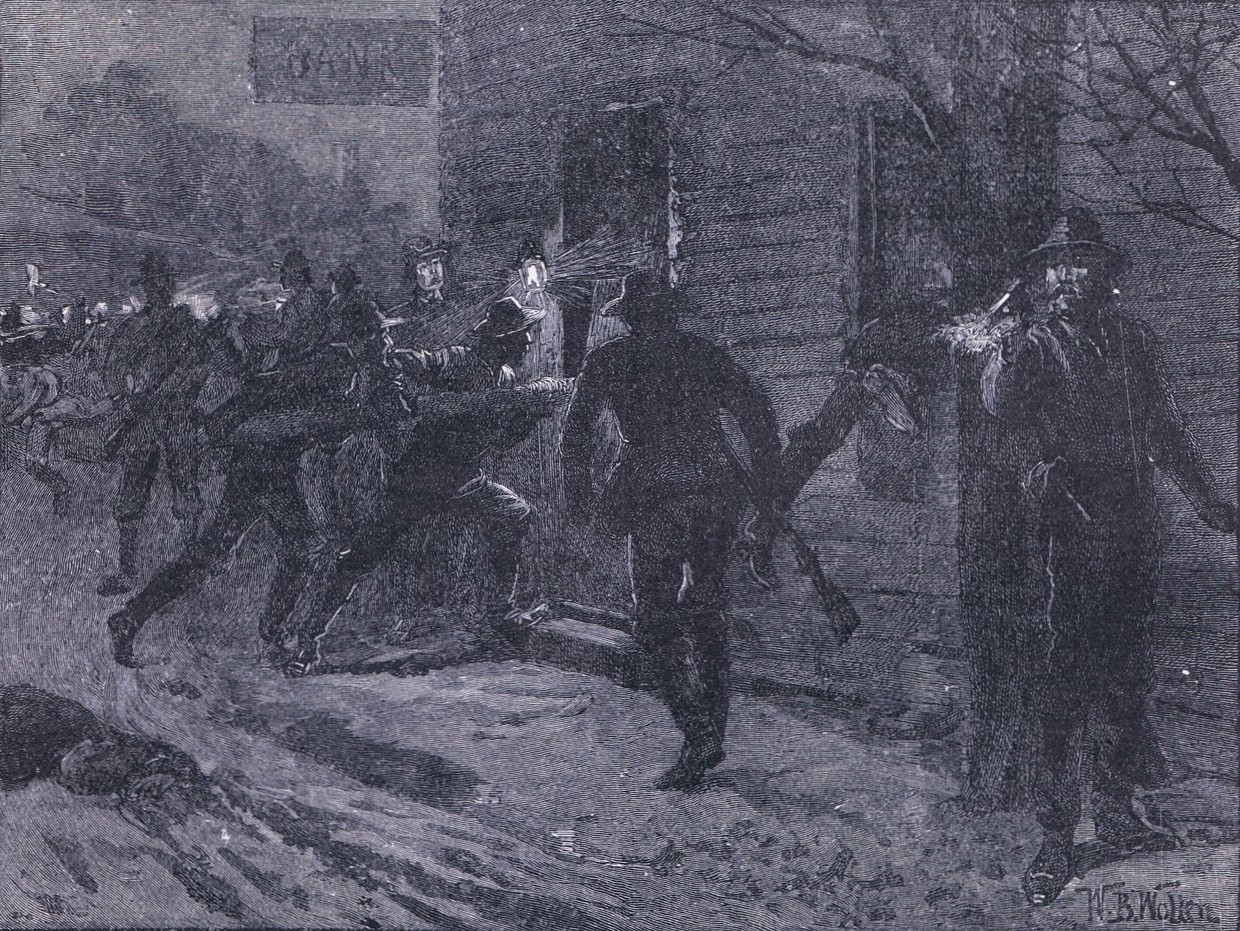
Confederate raid into Vermont, by William Barnes Wollen

St. Albans, Vermont, is the site of the northernmost land action in the Civil War, the St. Albans Raid. On October 19, 1864, Confederate raiders, under the command of Lieutenant Bennett H. Young, robbed three banks, escaped to Canada, were captured, and put on trial. The Canadian courts decided they were acting under military orders and they could not be extradited back to the United States without Canada violating her neutrality.

Most Vermont towns have a monument in memory of the soldiers who participated in the Civil War. Decades after the war, the upland hillsides of the state were littered with the cellar holes of long-gone farmhouses from farms that had been abandoned because all the family's sons had been killed in the Civil War.

There are several facilities in the state that have significant collections of manuscripts and archives of the war, including the Vermont State House, the Vermont Historical Society, University of Vermont Howe Library, the Bennington Museum, the Sheldon Museum in Middlebury, the Vermont Veterans Militia Museum and Library, Norwich University Sullivan Museum and special collections, and the State of Vermont Public Records Division.

== Notable Civil War leaders from Vermont ==
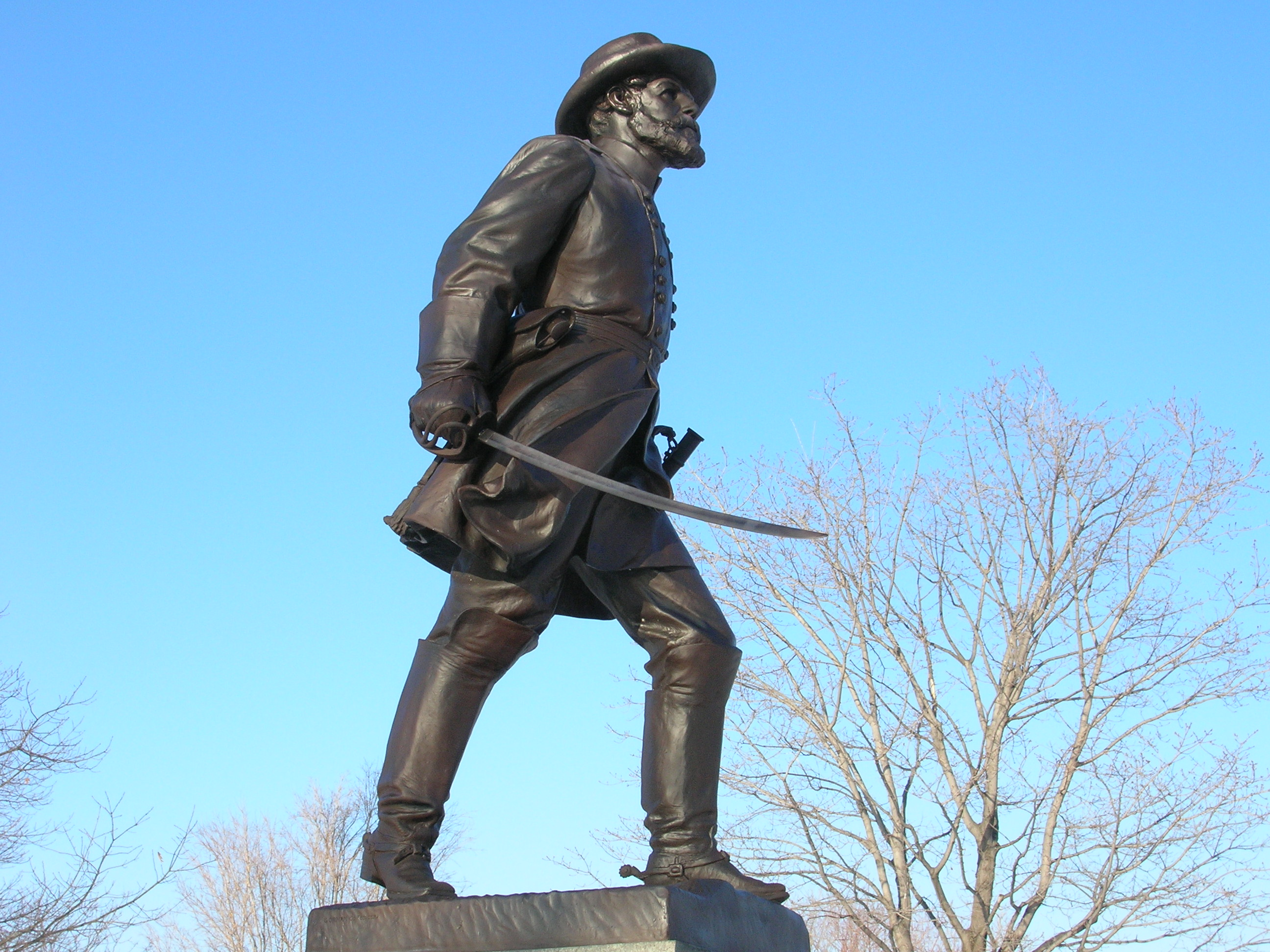
Statue of General William Wells in Battery Park in Burlington, Vermont

- George Dewey
- Erastus Fairbanks
- Lewis A. Grant
- Frederick Holbrook
- John Lonergan
- Redfield Proctor
- J. Gregory Smith
- William Farrar Smith
- George J. Stannard
- William Wells

== See also ==
- List of Vermont Civil War units
- History of Vermont
- Category:People of Vermont in the American Civil War
- Norwich University
- St. Albans Raid
