= John McMahon (wrestler) =

American professional wrestler (1841–1911)

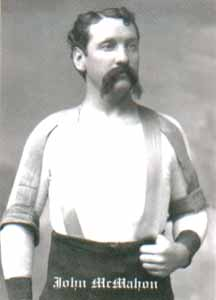

Personal information
- Born: July 7, 1841 Bakersfield, Vermont, US
- Died: April 3, 1911 (aged 69) Bakersfield, Vermont, US

Professional wrestling career
- Ring name(s): John McMahon; The Green Mountain Boy
- Billed height: 5 ft 10.5 in (1.79 m)
- Billed weight: 190 lb (86 kg)
- Debut: June 1861
- Retired: March 2, 1891

John McMahon (July 7, 1841 – April 3, 1911) was an American professional wrestler who specialized in collar-and-elbow wrestling. He competed from 1861 to 1891, and was undefeated for 17 years. He traveled throughout the world to face the top wrestlers of the day. He competed in several styles of wrestling which included collar-and-elbow, catch wrestling and Greco-Roman wrestling. His biggest rivalry was with Colonel J.H. McLaughlin. Toward the end of his career, he performed in wrestling matches for traveling circuses. He is no relation to the McMahon family.

== Career ==
John McMahon was born in Bakersfield, Vermont July 7, 1841, to Hugh McMahon and Ann Owens of Ireland. He had one younger brother, Thomas H. McMahon, and two sisters, Bridget and Elizabeth.

McMahon served in the Union army Co G 13th Vermont Volunteers under Captain Marvin White. during the Civil War. The 13th Regiment went into camp at Brattleboro on September 29, 1862, and was mustered into United States service on October 3 with 953 officers and men. It left Vermont on October 11, and arrived in Washington, D.C., on October 13. The regiment set up camp on East Capitol Hill, a half-mile west of the 12th Vermont Infantry, then moved to Camp Chase, Arlington, Virginia, on October 25, returning to East Capital Hill three days later when the 2nd Vermont Brigade was formed. The regiment marched to Munson's Hill on October 30, and Hunting Creek on November 5, where it stayed until November 26, in 'Camp Vermont'. It was engaged in picket duty near Fairfax Courthouse until December 12 to January 20, 1863, participating in a repulse of J.E.B. Stuart's cavalry on December 29. The regiment was stationed at Wolf Run Shoals from January 20 to April 2, then performed railroad guard duty at Warrenton Junction until June 25. On June 25, the brigade was assigned as the 3rd Brigade, 3rd Division, I Corps, and ordered to form the rear guard of the Army of the Potomac as it marched north after Robert E. Lee's Army of Northern Virginia. The 13th marched with the brigade from Wolf Run Shoals on June 25, crossed the Potomac river on June 27 at Edward's Ferry, and moved north through Frederick City and Creagerstown, Maryland. On the morning of July 1, it left Westminster, Maryland, arrived on the battlefield at Gettysburg after dark on the first day of the battle, and camped in a wheat field to the left of Cemetery Hill. He enlisted on Sept 11 1862 and mustering in on October 10. He mustered out July 21, 1863. During which time he gained notoriety as a wrestler. John McMahon began his professional wrestling career in Port Henry, New York in June 1861. He won the match, which began an undefeated streak that lasted until 1878. Although he favored the collar-and-elbow wrestling practiced in Ireland, the country of his ancestry, he also competed in matches that involved catch wrestling and Greco-Roman wrestling. On July 22, 1873, McMahon defeated Thomas Copeland to become recognized as the champion of the United States and Canada. The following month, he also defeated Albert Ellis, who was billed as the champion of England. Because McMahon outweighed his opponent by 60 pounds, the match was contested under Cornwall and Devon rules, which required both men to wear short jackets. His rivalry with Ellis continued, and the pair faced each other twice more. One bout was declared a draw because of a disputed call by the referee. McMahon won the third and final match between the two. McMahon also traveled to the Western United States in search of competitors. In 1877, he defeated Harry Thurston in a match held in a lumberyard in California. He was also sent to Virginia City, Nevada to help a gambler who had lost a large sum of money to "Dakota Bill" Tompkins. Without revealing his identity, McMahon arranged a match with Tompkins, a local championship wrestler. McMahon's friends bet money on McMahon, who defeated Tompkins in a best-of-five match.

McMahon wrestled James Farwell in January 1878; Falwell won a controversial victory to retain his status as champion of the Pacific Coast. After McMahon's main rival, Colonel J.H. McLaughlin, retired, McMahon ceased to compete as well. The two had never faced each other, but there was a dispute as to who would win if such a match took place. McMahon returned to Virginia City to open a saloon. In October of that year, McLaughlin offered a bet that nobody would be able to defeat Robert Wright, one of his trainees. McMahon accepted the bet, defeated Wright, and arranged a match against McLaughlin. He defeated McLaughlin in a best-of-three match on November 23, 1878. A rematch took place, which McLaughlin won. The third and final contest between the two took place in March 1879 and ended in a draw. On May 12 of that year, McMahon defeated Australian "Professor" William Miller in a best-of-three match before a crowd of over 2000 spectators in Gilmore's Garden in New York.

In August 1879, McMahon faced his second cousin once removed, James Owens, in the St. James Opera House on Broadway in New York City. McMahon lost the first fall but won the next two to claim victory in the match. They faced each other again on July 16, 1880, for the collar-and-elbow world championship. After a match lasting over three hours, McMahon emerged victorious to win the title.

In the mid-1880s, McMahon traveled internationally to compete and won titles in Australia and Argentina. In 1884, he defeated John Tedford in England to win the world collar-and-elbow wrestling championship.

In his later career, McMahon faced such wrestlers as Sorakichi Matsuda, Captain James C. Daly and Gus Lambert. He also faced William Muldoon, now a member of the Professional Wrestling Hall of Fame. One match between the two, which took place on March 22, 1881, featured a best-of-three-falls rule, in which the wrestlers competed in Muldoon's favored Greco-Roman style, followed by the collar-and-elbow style preferred by McMahon. Each competitor won the fall in his preferred style, which led to a catch-as-catch-can match to determine the winner. The match did not take place, however, as the men were unable to agree to the outfits to be worn during the match; as a result, the contest was declared a draw. One of McMahon's final series of matches was against Henry Moses Dufur. Their first match was declared a draw after neither competitor was able to throw the other within six hours. Although the wrestlers were willing to continue, the lease on the hall had expired and the match was ended at 2:45 in the morning. McMahon lost the second contest, but he defeated Dufur for the world collar-and-elbow championship in their final encounter.

McMahon also wrestled in traveling circuses. He was part of Adam Forepaugh's Circus, and he competed for P. T. Barnum's circus for over two years. With the latter group, he wrestled over 300 pre-arranged matches against Ed Decker. He also continued in regular competition outside the circus; in his final match, he defeated Jim Cowley on March 2, 1891. After retiring from wrestling he returned to Bakersfield, Vermont to become a farmer. McMahon never married and died after an attack of angina pectoris on April 3, 1911. He is buried in Saint Georges Catholic Cemetery located in Bakersfield, Vermont.

== Championships and accomplishments ==
- Collar-and-Elbow Championship (2 times)
