= Asa P. Blunt =

Asa Peabody Blunt
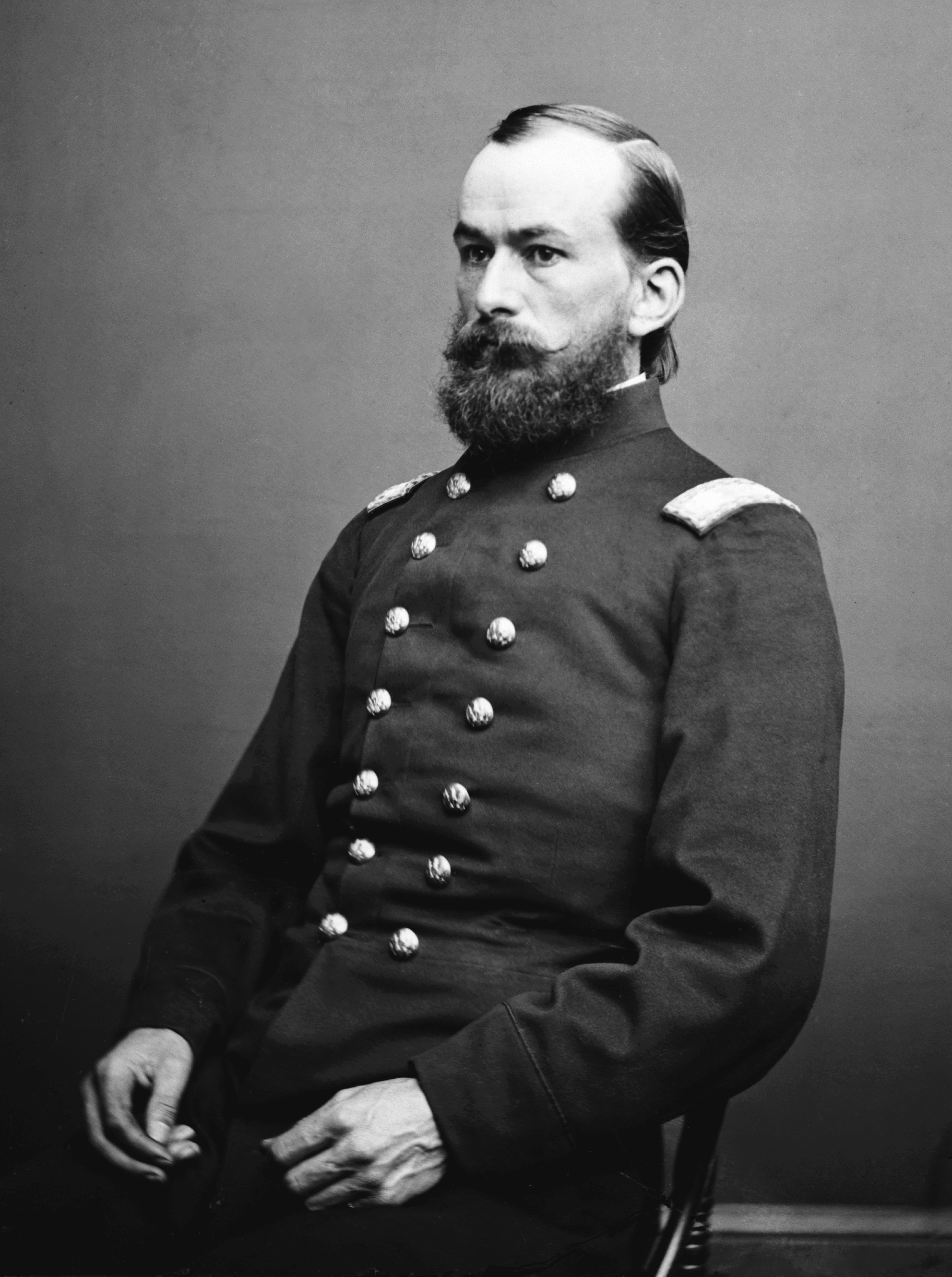
- As a Colonel in 1862
- Born: October 19, 1826; Danville, Vermont, US
- Died: October 4, 1889 (aged 62); Manchester, New Hampshire, US
- Burial place: Pine Grove Cemetery, Manchester, New Hampshire
- Military career
- Allegiance: United States; Union
- Branch: United States Army; Union Army
- Service years: 1861–1888
- Rank: Colonel; Brevet Brigadier general
- Units: 3rd Vermont Infantry; 6th Vermont Infantry; 12th Vermont Infantry; 2nd Vermont Brigade
- Conflicts: American Civil War; Battle at Lee's Mills; Battle of Savage's Station

Asa Peabody Blunt (October 19, 1826 – October 4, 1889) was an officer in the Union Army during the American Civil War. He remained on active duty after the war. In recognition of his service during the Civil War, he was appointed to the grade of brevet brigadier general of volunteers. Blunt was notable as commander of the 2nd Vermont Brigade and the United States Disciplinary Barracks at Fort Leavenworth, Kansas.

== Early life ==
Blunt was born in Danville, Vermont. In 1850, Asa and his wife Mary were living in Southampton, New York, where he was an overseer in a cotton mill. By 1860, they were living in St. Johnsbury, Vermont, where Blunt was a draftsman for the Fairbanks Scales company.

== Civil War ==
Blunt was appointed adjutant of the 3rd Vermont Infantry on June 6, 1861, and was mustered into federal service on July 16. On September 25, he was promoted to lieutenant colonel, 6th Vermont Infantry, and then Colonel of the 12th Vermont Infantry on September 19, 1862. On October 27, the 2nd Vermont Brigade was formed from the 12th, 13th, 14th, 15th, and 16th, Vermont Infantry regiments, and Blunt assumed temporary command of the brigade as the ranking colonel, filling this position until December 7, when Brigadier General Edwin H. Stoughton arrived and assumed command.

Stoughton was not popular with the officers and men of the brigade, so when he was captured by Confederate partisan John S. Mosby on March 9, 1863, few mourned his loss. Colonel Blunt assumed command of the brigade again, turning it over to the new brigade commander, Brigadier General George J. Stannard, on April 20.

By the end of June, most of the brigade was waiting to muster out, their nine months obligation ended. But Robert E. Lee's incursion into Pennsylvania delayed that for a few weeks, and the brigade finally got to see some action. Blunt's 12th and the 15th regiments, however, were left behind in Emmitsburg, Maryland, guarding the supply trains, and were not able to participate in the brigade's flanking movement that helped stop Pickett's Charge on July 3 at the Battle of Gettysburg. On July 4, Blunt's regiment was released to return to Vermont, and he mustered out with the regiment on July 14, 1863.

Just more than six months later, On February 24, 1864, Blunt was appointed Captain and Assistant Quartermaster of Volunteers, and was ordered to report to the Commanding General, Department of Virginia and North Carolina, for duty in the Quartermaster's Department, which duties he assumed on April 25. He became the Depot Quartermaster for the Army of the James on May 4, 1864, and served in this position until late 1865. In recognition of his meritorious service at the Battle at Lee's Mills and Savage's Station, President Andrew Johnson, on May 4, 1866, nominated Blunt for appointment to the grade of brevet brigadier general of volunteers, to rank from March 13, 1865, and the United States Senate confirmed the appointment on May 18, 1866. He also received appointments to the brevet grades of major, lieutenant colonel and colonel of volunteers, Quartermaster's Department, to rank from June 9, 1865. He received appointments to the same brevet grades in the Regular Army to rank from March 2, 1867.

== Postwar life ==
On July 14, he was transferred to Fort Monroe, remaining there until July 1866. In late August, he was transferred to the position of Chief of Quartermaster Department of the Potomac.

He received a regular army commission as captain and Assistant Quartermaster on March 28, 1867, and the same day, brevets to major and lieutenant colonel. On April 5, 1867, he was ordered to duty in connection with the National Cemeteries in the valleys of the James and Appomattox rivers and south of Richmond. On April 9, 1867, he was mustered out of the volunteers. On April 11 appointed Chief Quartermaster, First Military District, with headquarters in Richmond. He was later ordered to Washington, D.C., and placed in charge of Lincoln Depot and the various National Cemeteries in the Department of Washington. By March 1, 1869, he was Department Quartermaster in Charleston, South Carolina.

Between 1877 and 1888 Blunt was Commandant of the United States Disciplinary Barracks at Fort Leavenworth, Kansas.

Blunt was promoted to permanent major on September 29, 1889. He died in Manchester, New Hampshire on October 4, 1889.

== See also ==
- List of American Civil War brevet generals (Union)
