= Stephen F. Brown =

American lawyer

Stephen Flavius Brown
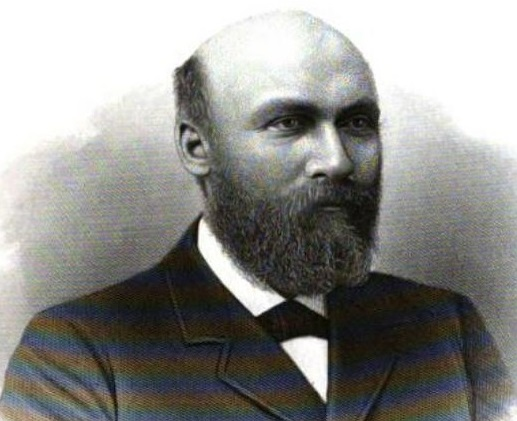
- Stephen F. Brown in 1891
- Born: April 4, 1841; Swanton, Vermont, US
- Died: September 8, 1903 (aged 62); Swanton, Vermont, US
- Burial place: Church Street Cemetery, Swanton, Vermont, US
- Military career
- Allegiance: United States; Union
- Branch: Union Army
- Service years: 1862–1864
- Rank: Captain
- Units: 13th Vermont Infantry; 17th Vermont Infantry
- Conflicts: American Civil War: Battle of Gettysburg; Battle of the Wilderness
- Other work: Attorney

Stephen F. Brown (April 4, 1841 – September 8, 1903) was a Union Army officer in the American Civil War. He became famous for entering the Battle of Gettysburg armed only with a camp hatchet. He soon acquired a sword and pistol from a Confederate he took prisoner. Brown distinguished himself in battle and aiding other soldiers.

After the war, he graduated from Albany Law School, and moved to the growing city of Chicago to set up a practice. He became a businessman in addition to attorney. Brown rebuilt his practice and businesses after losing multiple properties in the Great Chicago Fire of 1871. Two decades later he returned to Swanton, Vermont to aid his aging parents.

The 13th Vermont Infantry honored Brown by placing a statue of him on the Regimental Monument at Gettysburg.

== Early life ==
Stephen Flavius Brown was born to Samuel G. Brown and Anne M. (Crawford) Brown in Swanton, Vermont, on April 4, 1841. He had a brother, Samuel G. Brown, Jr., and sister Ann E., who died young. Their father farmed on the Crawford homestead. After Stephen Brown was educated in Swanton, he started working in winters as a teacher, while also attending school in Swanton Falls. He farmed with his father in summer. He passed the entry exam and planned to begin studies at the University of Vermont in the fall of 1862.

Instead of beginning college, Brown enlisted for the Civil War as a Private in Company K, 13th Vermont Infantry Regiment, a nine months' regiment. He was soon elected the company's First Lieutenant. The 13th Vermont was part of the 2nd Vermont Brigade, and carried out duties in Maryland and Virginia during 1862 and 1863.

== Battle of Gettysburg ==
In July 1863, the 2nd Vermont Brigade marched from Maryland to Gettysburg, Pennsylvania, as part of the VI Corps. While en route, Brown violated a "no straggling" order and disobeyed a security detail guarding a well in order to refill the canteens of several soldiers in his company who were succumbing to the summer heat. Brown was arrested and relieved of his sword and pistol, an officer's symbols of authority. But given the fierce fighting at the Battle of Gettysburg, Brown was allowed to keep marching with his men.

Once the 2nd Brigade arrived at Gettysburg, Brown determined to reclaim his honor by taking part in the fight. Arming himself with a hand axe from a woodpile near his regiment's camp, Brown charged into battle to the cheers of his men. During the hand-to-hand combat, he compelled the surrender of a Confederate officer, and took his sword and pistol before making him a prisoner.

During the battle, Brown suffered head trauma from the concussion of an artillery shell, which exploded near him as he gave aid to a member of the regiment who had lost a leg during the fighting. Despite hearing loss and other effects from the concussion, Brown refused to leave the field, telling the regimental surgeon that he would continue to fight unless the entire regiment was ordered to retreat.

The 13th Vermont's role at Gettysburg included taking part in the counterattack on Pickett's Charge. Units of the 2nd Vermont Brigade, commanded by George J. Stannard, marched out from the Union lines, executed a left flank maneuver, and fired directly into the flank of Pickett's men as they advanced. Stannard's timely action effectively ended Pickett's Charge and the Battle of Gettysburg.

Brown continued to wear the captured sword and pistol until the end of his service. The charges against him for violating the "no straggling" order were not pursued.

== Later military service ==
After the 13th Vermont's term of service ended in 1863, Brown reenlisted, as did many of his fellow soldiers. This time he was a member of the 17th Vermont Infantry. Promoted to Captain, he was assigned as commander of the regiment's Company A.

In May 1864 Brown was wounded at the Battle of the Wilderness, when a bullet struck his left shoulder as he was giving orders to his company. His left arm had to be amputated, and Brown was discharged in August 1864.

== Later life ==
After the war Brown enrolled at Albany Law School. He graduated in 1868.

He moved to Chicago, which was growing rapidly. There he established a successful law practice and was also successful as a real estate investor. During the Great Chicago Fire of 1871 he lost his law library, the building containing his law office, and several other buildings he owned. He was able to recover and continue his law practice and business activities.

In May 1882 the U. S. Grant Grand Army of the Republic Post (Number 28) in Chicago held a testimonial dinner in Brown's honor. They presented him with a medal to commemorate his heroism at Gettysburg.

In 1891 Brown returned to his hometown of Swanton to care for his aged parents. His father died during that year. He continued to reside there after his mother died, too.

In 1901 Brown was elected President of the Reunion Society of Vermont Officers. He was active in the Grand Army of the Republic (GAR) and the Military Order of the Loyal Legion of the United States (MOLLUS).

== Death and burial ==
Brown died in Swanton on September 8, 1903. He is buried at Church Street Cemetery in Swanton.

== Family ==
His father Samuel G. Brown enlisted at the start of the war, and served in Company A, 1st Vermont Infantry.

Brown's brother, Samuel G. Brown Jr., served as a lieutenant in the 17th Vermont Infantry. Wounded in the Battle of the Wilderness, he died in Washington, D.C., from typhoid fever.

In 1896 Brown married Mary N. McDonough in Swanton.

== Honors and legacy ==
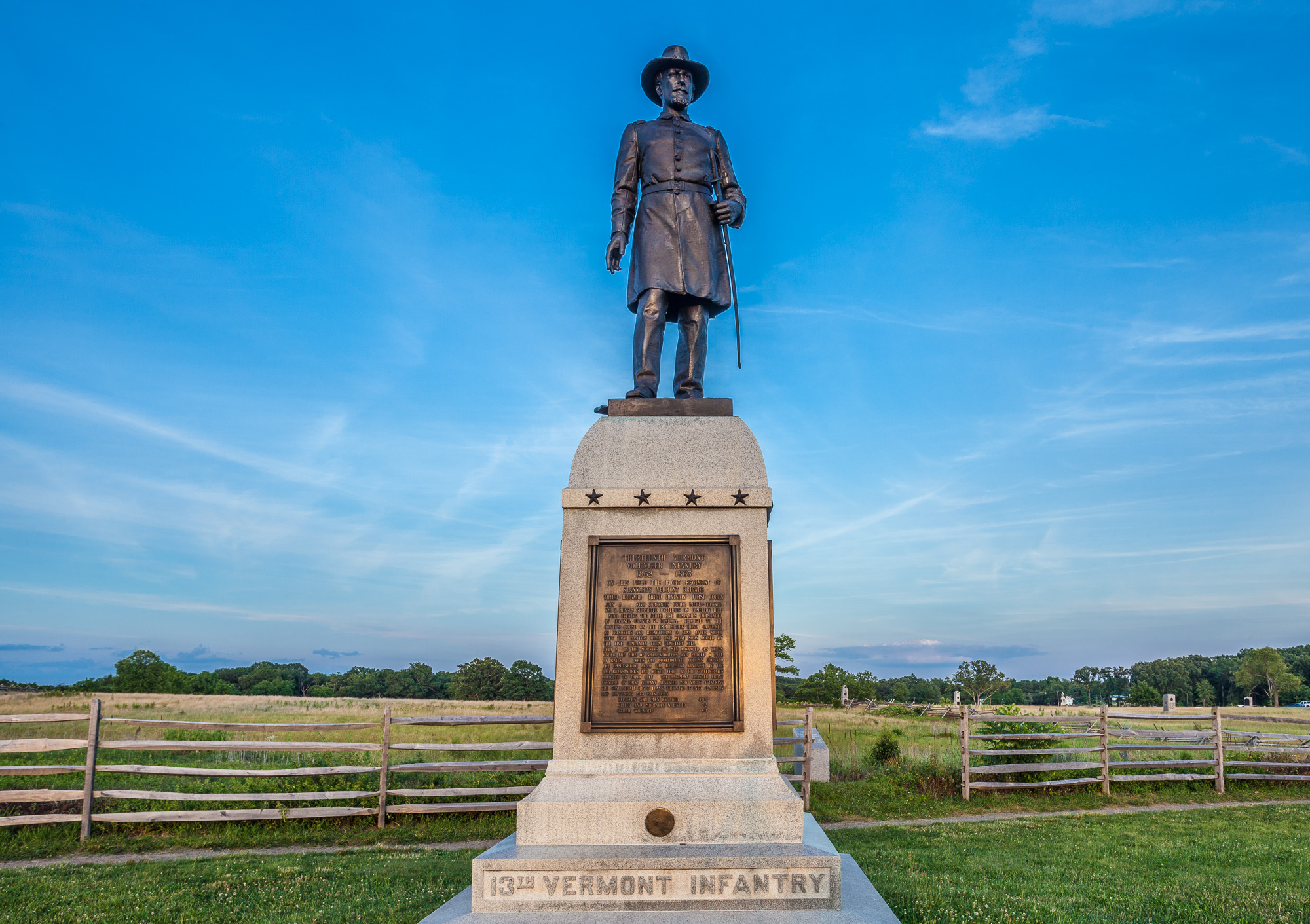
13th Vermont Infantry monument at Gettysburg.

The monument to the 13th Vermont on the Gettysburg battlefield is topped with a statue of Brown. The War Department would not allow Brown to be depicted carrying his axe, regarding that as a tribute to disobedience of orders. Instead, the statue depicts him with a sword at his side and an axe at his feet.

A panel on the base of the monument is dedicated to Brown. It reads:

The statue represents Stephen F. Brown, Co. K, who arrived on the field without a sword, but seized a camp hatchet, and carried it in the battle until he captured a sword from a Confederate officer. Persevering and determining like him were all the men of this regiment of Green Mountain Boys.

Brown presented the sword he seized at Gettysburg to the Vermont Historical Society.
