= George Grenville Benedict =

American politician and soldier (1826–1907)

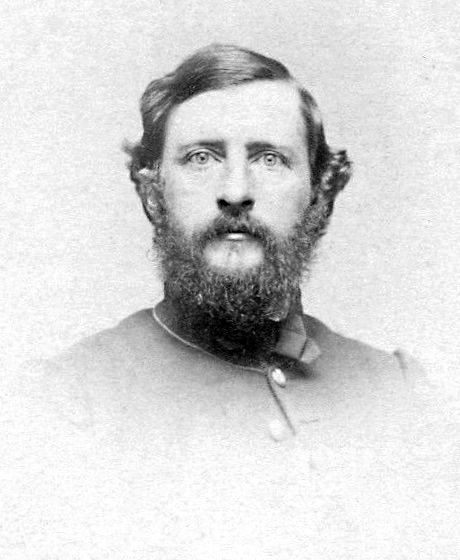
- Benedict as a private in the 12th Vermont Infantry.
- Born: December 10, 1826; Burlington, Vermont
- Died: April 8, 1907 (aged 80); Burlington, Vermont
- Burial place: Greenmount Cemetery
- Military career
- Allegiance: United States of America
- Branch: United States Army; Vermont Militia
- Service years: 1862 - 1865; 1866 - 1867
- Rank: Major (Union Army); Colonel (Militia)
- Unit: 12th Regiment Vermont Volunteer Infantry
- Conflicts: American Civil War: Battle of Gettysburg
- Awards: Medal of Honor

George Grenville Benedict (December 10, 1826 – April 8, 1907) was an American politician, newspaper editor and soldier who fought in the American Civil War. Benedict was awarded the country's highest award for bravery during combat, the Medal of Honor, for his action during the Battle of Gettysburg in Pennsylvania on July 3, 1863. He was honored with the award on June 27, 1892.

== Biography ==
Benedict was born on December 10, 1826, in Burlington, Vermont. He entered the University of Vermont and graduated with honors in 1847, receiving the degree of Master of Arts in 1850. While a student, he became a member of the Sigma Phi Society as well as the Phi Beta Kappa honor society. He was married on October 27, 1853, to Mary Anne, the daughter of Edward and Abigail Frances Kellogg of Canaan, New York.

He was editor and publisher of The Burlington Daily Free Press in Burlington, Vermont. He served as the president of the Vermont & Boston Telegraph Company from 1859 to 1863; was elected by the people of Chittenden county as a member of the Vermont Senate 1869-71; and served as the secretary of the Corporation of the University of Vermont and State Agricultural College from 1865 to 1879. He was selected as a delegate to the Republican National Convention in 1880. Also in 1880, Benedict was elected to the University of Vermont Board of Trustees.

He served two terms as Burlington postmaster (1861 to 1864 and 1871 to 1874).

=== Military career ===
Benedict enlisted in the 12th Vermont Infantry at Burlington in August 1862. On the third day of the Battle of Gettysburg, he was among a group of men involved in the successful flank attack on Pickett's Charge, for which he gained the Medal of Honor.

In 1863, he was promoted to a lieutenant, and later appointed aid-de-camp on the staff of Gen. George J. Standard, commanding the 2nd Brigade of Vermont Volunteers. By 1865, he held the office of assistant inspector general with the rank of major. Rising again in 1866, Benedict was appointed aide-de-camp to Governor Paul Dillingham with the rank of colonel. Colonel Benedict was appointed to be military historian of the State of Vermont by Governor Redfield Proctor in 1879.

=== Books ===
During his nine-month stint in the Army, Benedict wrote back letters to the newspaper, The Burlington Daily Free Press, for publication. After the war, he later compiled these letters into a two-volume work Vermont in the Civil War: A History of the Part Taken by the Vermont Soldiers and Sailors in the War for the Union 1861-1865 in 1866.

In 1895, he also published Army Life in Virginia: Letters from the Twelfth Vermont Regiment and Personal Experiences of Volunteer Service in the War for the Union 1862-1863.

=== Memberships ===
Benedict was a member of the Military Order of the Loyal Legion of the United States and the Vermont Society of the Sons of the American Revolution. He was elected a member of the American Antiquarian Society in 1899.

=== Death ===
Colonel Benedict died on April 8, 1907, aged 80, in Burlington, Vermont. He is buried in the Greenmount Cemetery in that city.

== Medal of Honor citation ==
Rank and organization: Second Lieutenant, Company C, 12th Vermont Infantry. Place and date: At Gettysburg, Pa., July 3, 1863.

Passed through a murderous fire of grape and canister in delivering orders and re-formed the crowded lines.

== See also ==
- Battle of Gettysburg, Third Day cavalry battles
- List of Medal of Honor recipients for the Battle of Gettysburg
- List of American Civil War Medal of Honor recipients: A–F
