= William T. Nichols =

American politician

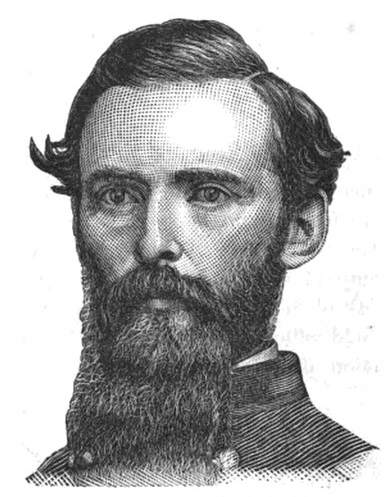
From 1887's A Short History of the 14th Vermont Regiment

William Thomas Nichols (March 24, 1829 - April 10, 1882) was a 19th-century politician, soldier, and businessman. He served in both houses of the Vermont legislature and commanded the 14th Vermont Infantry during the American Civil War. After the war, he became a founder of the Illinois village of Maywood, now a suburb of Chicago.

== Biography ==
William T. Nichols was born in Clarendon, Vermont, the son of James Tilson Nichols and Minerva D. (Briggs) Nichols. Trained as a lawyer, he served as an assistant clerk in Vermont’s House of Representatives and then as the state's attorney in 1858–59.

In 1855, he traveled to Kansas Territory and became involved in the dispute over whether the territory would enter the United States as a slave-owning or free state. At one point, he volunteered for the risky task of delivering dispatches from the journalist William A. Phillips to Charles L. Robinson, a Free-Stater who was acting as territorial governor and who would later become the first governor of the state of Kansas. For this service, Nichols was appointed to Robinson's staff with the rank of colonel. He returned to Vermont the following year.

Nichols served in two volunteer Vermont regiments during the Civil War. In 1861, he enlisted as a private in the short-lived 1st Vermont Infantry, remaining until the unit was mustered out of service three months later. In 1862, he was commissioned colonel to command the 14th Vermont Infantry. He led his regiment in repulsing Pickett's Charge at the Battle of Gettysburg. Shortly after Gettysburg, the 14th Vermont Infantry was mustered out of service.

Nichols's service in the state legislature overlapped the war years. In September 1861, just after the 1st Vermont Infantry was disbanded, he was elected to the Vermont House of Representatives. In 1863, after the disbanding of the 14th Vermont Infantry, he was elected to the Vermont Senate, becoming the youngest man (at age 34) ever to serve as a Vermont state senator.

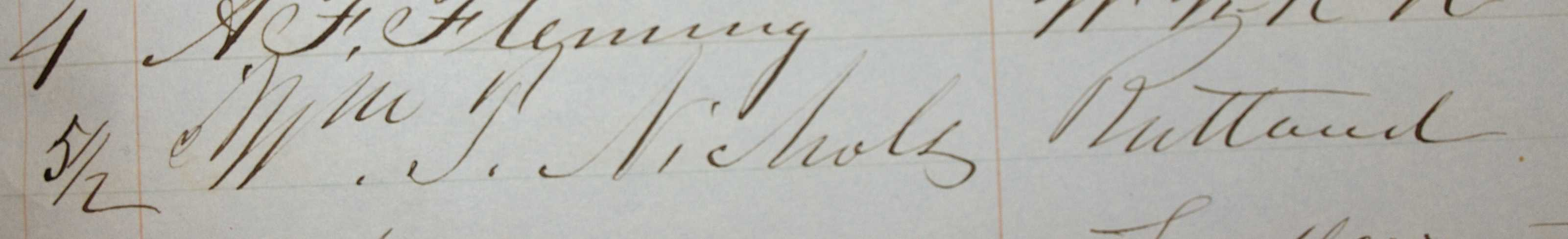
Colonel William Thomas Nichols' signature from the Franklin House Hotel Guest Register, Sept. 1854 - April 1855. From the private collection of H. Blair Howell.

After the war, having lost money in various investments, Nichols determined to go south to invest in real estate. In October 1865, Nichols took passage on the SS Republic steamship, bound for New Orleans. It ran into a hurricane off the coast of Georgia and sank. Nichols—who afterwards wrote a detailed account of the sinking to his wife in a letter that has survived—managed to get into lifeboat number 2, which two days later was rescued by the sailing ship Horace Beals. Once arrived in the south, Nichols bought two cotton plantations and invested in a tannery.

Nichols did not stay in the south, however, and eventually ended up in the area of Chicago, Illinois. On April 6, 1869, with six other men, he founded the Maywood Company, a consortium that led to the incorporation of the village of Maywood, Illinois, in 1881. Maywood, now a suburb of Chicago, was named in honor of Nichols's daughter May. Nichols served as the president of the company until his death.

Nichols was also the president and treasurer of a subsidiary venture that manufactured farm tools, the Chicago Scraper and Ditcher Company. In 1878, he patented a new version of the screw harrow for soil cultivation.

Nichols died of pneumonia in Maywood in 1882 and is buried in Evergreen Cemetery in Rutland, Vermont.

== Personal life ==
Nichols married Thyrza Stevens Crampton (b. 1832), and they had two daughters, May (b. 1857) and Lucy (b. 1860). Thyrza and May both died of typhoid fever in 1865. May died before Nichols left on his ill-fated voyage on the SS Republic, and Thyrza died shortly after she learned that Nichols had survived the shipwreck. Nichols remarried, with his second wife being Thyrza's sister Helen.

Nichols's great-great-granddaughter is the writer Thyrza Nichols Goodeve. She accompanied a 2004 expedition to the site of the SS Republic wreck, which had been located the year before.
