= 13th Vermont Infantry Regiment =

- Flag of Vermont, 1837–1923
- Active: October 3, 1862 to July 21, 1863
- Disbanded: July 21, 1863
- Allegiance: United States; Union
- Branch: United States Army; Union Army
- Type: Infantry
- Engagements: Battle of Gettysburg

Commanders
- Colonel: Francis V. Randall

The 13th Vermont Infantry Regiment was a nine months' infantry regiment in the Union Army during the American Civil War. It served in the eastern theater, predominantly in the Defenses of Washington, from October 1862 to August 1863. It was a member of the 2nd Vermont Brigade.

== History ==
The 13th Vermont Infantry was raised as a result of President Lincoln's call on August 4, 1862, for additional troops due to the disastrous results of the Peninsula Campaign. It was composed of volunteers from Washington, Chittenden, Lamoille and Franklin counties, as follows:

- Company A, Emmett Guards of Burlington, Captain John Lonergan.
- Company B, Waitsfield, Company, Captain Orcas C. Wilder.
- Company C, East Montpelier, Company, Captain Lewis L. Coburn.
- Company D, Colchester, Company, Captain William D. Munson.
- Company E, Morristown, Company, Captain Joseph J. Boynton.
- Company F, Richmond, Company, Captain John L. Yale.
- Company G, Bakersfield, Company, Captain Marvin White.
- Company H, Lafayette Artillery of Calais, Captain William V. Peck.
- Company I, Montpelier, Company, Captain John M. Thacher.
- Company K, Highgate, Company, Captain George S. Blake.

The regiment's commander, Colonel Francis V. Randall of Braintree, had served with the 2nd Vermont Infantry. Lieutenant Colonel Andrew C. Brown had no previous military experience. Major Lawrence D. Clark had served as captain of Co. A, 1st Vermont Infantry. Clark resigned in March 1863 because of impaired health, and was replaced by Captain Joseph J. Boynton, of Company C. Brown resigned in May 1863, and was succeeded by Captain William D. Munson, of Company D.

James Stevens Peck, originally a second lieutenant in Company I, was subsequently appointed regimental adjutant.

The 13th Regiment went into camp at Brattleboro on September 29, 1862, and was mustered into United States service on October 3 with 953 officers and men. It left Vermont on October 11, and arrived in Washington, D.C., on October 13.

The regiment suffered its first two casualties within two weeks of arriving in Washington: Isaac N. Brooks, 16, of Company E, died on October 26; and Lieutenant Nathaniel Jones Jr., of Company B, died of typhoid fever on October 29.

The regiment set up camp on East Capitol Hill, a half-mile west of the 12th Vermont Infantry, then moved to Camp Chase, Arlington, Virginia, on October 25. They returned to East Capitol Hill three days later when the 2nd Vermont Brigade was formed.

The regiment marched to Munson's Hill on October 30, and Hunting Creek on November 5, where it stayed until November 26, in 'Camp Vermont'. It was engaged in picket duty near Fairfax Courthouse from December 12 to January 20, 1863. It participated in a repulse of J.E.B. Stuart's cavalry on December 29. The regiment was stationed at Wolf Run Shoals from January 20 to April 2, then performed railroad guard duty at Warrenton Junction until June 25.

On June 25, the brigade was assigned as the 3rd Brigade, 3rd Division, I Corps, and ordered to form the rear guard of the Army of the Potomac as it marched north after Robert E. Lee's Army of Northern Virginia. The 13th marched with the brigade from Wolf Run Shoals on June 25, crossed the Potomac River on June 27 at Edward's Ferry, and moved north through Frederick City and Creagerstown, Maryland.

On the morning of July 1, it left Westminster, Maryland, arriving on the battlefield at Gettysburg after dark on the first day of the battle. It camped in a wheat field to the left of Cemetery Hill.

== Gettysburg ==
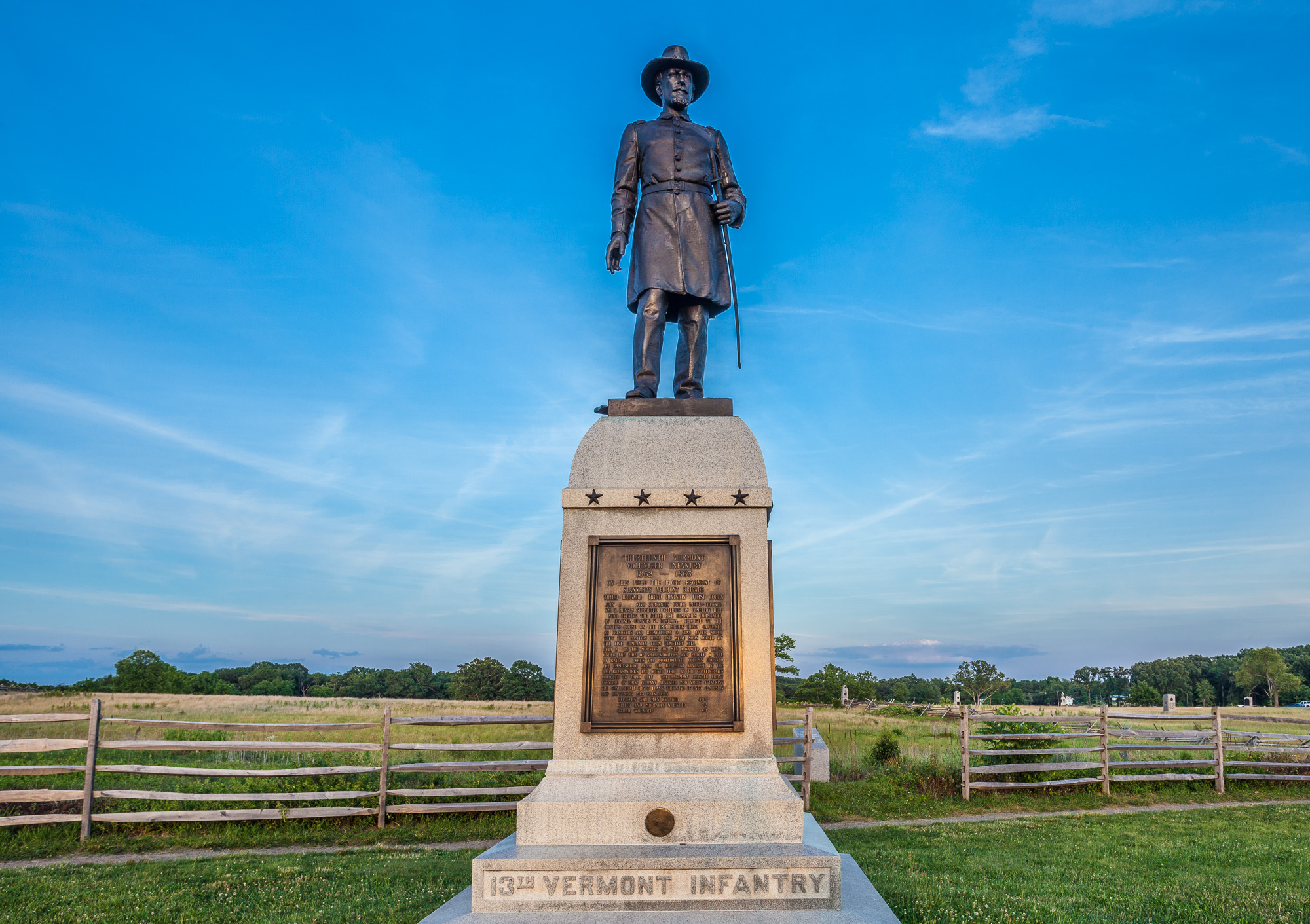
Memorial to the 13th Vermont Volunteer Infantry at Gettysburg

On the afternoon of July 2, the 13th responded to a request by General Winfield S. Hancock to assist Lieutenant Gulian V. Weir, Battery C, 5th U.S. Artillery, whose battery was in danger of being captured by a regiment of Brigadier General Ambrose R. Wright's brigade. The battery was saved and moved back to the rear. The 13th moved forward to Emmittsburg road and captured two rebel guns. Receiving fire from Rodgers' house, Captain John Lonergan, Company A, surrounded the building and took 81 prisoners from an Alabama regiment, returning to the main lines on Cemetery Ridge. He subsequently received the Medal of Honor for his actions.

The 13th, 14th and 16th Vermont Regiments played a pivotal role in the Union repulse of Pickett's Charge on the afternoon of July 3. The 13th and 16th flanked James L. Kemper's brigade as it approached the copse of trees on Cemetery Ridge, then the 16th wheeled about, and joined by the 14th, stopped the advance of Cadmus M. Wilcox's brigade, capturing hundreds of Virginians. Lieutenant George Grenville Benedict, an aide to Brigadier General George J. Stannard, related General Abner Doubleday's reaction, saying he "waved his hat and shouted: 'Glory to God, glory to God! See the Vermonters go it!'"

During the forced march from Virginia to Gettysburg, 1st Lieutenant Stephen F. Brown, Company K, had disobeyed orders and left the regiment to get water for his men. He was placed in arrest and had his sword and sidearm taken from him. When the regiment arrived on the battlefield at Gettysburg, he was released from arrest, but his weapons were back in the regiment's supply train. Taking a camp hatchet, he went into battle, captured a rebel officer and relieved him of his sword and sidearm. Lieutenant Brown, who subsequently served in the 17th Vermont Infantry, kept the sword and eventually donated it to the Vermont Historical Society.

During the battle, the 13th's surgeon, George Nichols, was in charge of a field hospital for the I Corps.

After the battle, the 13th Regiment participated in the pursuit of Lee's Army of Northern Virginia across the Catoctin mountains on July 7, to Middletown, Maryland, on July 8, when it was ordered home. The regiment marched to Monocacy Junction, where it took a train to Baltimore. Departing Baltimore on July 11, the regiment was met by the 12th Vermont Infantry in Brattleboro on July 13. After a few days furlough, the regiment was mustered out on July 21.

Like the other regiments in the 2nd Vermont Brigade, dozens of newly discharged members from the 13th Regiment enlisted again, predominantly in the regiments of the 1st Vermont Brigade, and the 17th Vermont Infantry.

== Medal of Honor citation ==
- John Lonergan, Captain, Company A, for gallantry in the recapture of four guns and the capture of two additional guns from the enemy; also the capture of a number of prisoners" at Gettysburg, July 2, 1863.

== Final statement ==
Final Statement
Original members	957
Gain (recruits and transfers)	11
--- Aggregate	968
--- Losses ---
Killed in action	12
Died of wounds	8
Died of disease	53
Total of deaths	72
Honorably discharged	83
Deserted	7
--- Total losses	162
Mustered out at various times	806
Total wounded	84
Total taken prisoner	5

== See also ==
Vermont in the Civil War
