= 6th Pennsylvania Heavy Artillery Regiment =

Union Army artillery regiment

6th Pennsylvania Heavy Artillery
- Pennsylvania flag
- Active: September 15, 1864, to June 15, 1865
- Country: United States
- Allegiance: Union
- Branch: Heavy Artillery
- Engagements: Participated in no engagements. Was assigned to garrison duty for the entire duration of service.

The 6th Pennsylvania Heavy Artillery was a heavy artillery regiment that served in the Union Army from 1864 to 1865, during the American Civil War.

== History ==
Because the 5th Pennsylvania Heavy Artillery had more men than was standard for a heavy artillery regiment, the excess men were organized into the 6th Heavy Artillery. The men of the 5th were from Allegheny, Butler, Westmoreland, Fayette, Washington, and Lawrence Counties. Charles Barnes was the first colonel, Joseph B. Copeland lieutenant colonel, Robert H. Long, Joseph R. Kemp, and Frank H. White were majors. (Due to their large size, it was usual for heavy artillery regiments that served as field infantry to be divided into two or more battalions.) The regiment was mustered together at Camp Reynolds near Pittsburgh, Pennsylvania, on September 15, 1864. As was usual for this time in the war, it was initially trained as an infantry unit, not heavy artillery.

The regiment was sent to the Department of Washington as part of the 2nd Brigade, DeRussy's Division, XXII Corps. Later that month, it was assigned to protect the Orange and Alexandria Railroad. In mid-November, after Major General Philip Sheridan cleared the Shenadoah Valley of Confederate forces, the 6th was returned to Washington, D.C., and converted into heavy artillery. It served at various forts around the city for the rest of the war.

It was mustered out on June 15, 1865, and disbanded at Camp Reynolds on June 17.

== Casualties ==
- Killed and mortally wounded: - officers, 2 enlisted men
- Wounded: - officers, - enlisted men
- Died of disease: - officers, 44 enlisted men
- Captured and missing: - officers, - enlisted men
- Total: - officers, 46 enlisted men
