= 15th Vermont Infantry Regiment =

- Flag of Vermont, 1837–1923
- Active: October 22, 1862 to August 5, 1863
- Disbanded: August 5, 1863
- Allegiance: United States; Union
- Branch: United States Army; Union Army
- Type: Infantry

Commanders
- Colonel: Redfield Proctor

The 15th Vermont Infantry Regiment was a nine-months' infantry regiment in the Union Army during the American Civil War. It served in the eastern theater, predominantly in the Defenses of Washington, from October 1862 to August 1863. It was a member of the 2nd Vermont Brigade.

== History ==
The 15th Vermont Infantry was raised as a result of U.S. President Abraham Lincoln's call on August 4, 1862, for additional troops, due to the disastrous results of the Peninsula Campaign.

It was composed of volunteers from Caledonia, Orleans, Orange and Windsor counties, as follows:

- West Fairlee, Co. A
- Danville, Co. B
- West Randolph, Co. C
- Wait's River, Co. D
- Island Pond, Co. E
- McIndoe's Falls, Co. F
- Lyndon, Co. G
- Frontier Guards of Coventry, Co. H
- Barton, Co. I
- St. Johnsbury, Co. K

Colonel Redfield Proctor, previously of the 3rd and 5th Vermont regiments, was selected to command the regiment. He would later serve as Governor of Vermont. William W. Grout, the regiment's lieutenant colonel, would later serve in the U.S. Congress.

The regiment went into camp at Brattleboro on October 8, 1862, occupying barracks just vacated the day before by the 12th Vermont Infantry, and was mustered into United States service on October 22. It left Vermont on October 23, and arrived in Washington, D.C., on October 26; the next day it joined the 14th Vermont Infantry and some Maine regiments in Camp Chase, in Arlington, Virginia, then returned to camp on East Capitol Hill, and on October 30 became part of the 2nd Vermont Brigade.

The regiment marched to Munson's Hill on October 30, and Hunting Creek the next day, where it stayed until November 26. It performed picket duty at Occoquan Creek from November 26, to December 4, when it moved to "Camp Vermont" until December 12. It engaged in further picket duty near Fairfax Courthouse until December 20, then moved to Fairfax Station until March 24. From March 24 to May 7 it was at Union Mills, followed by nearly two weeks at Bealeton. It returned to Union Mills until mid-June, then for ten days elements of the regiment were stations at Bristoe Station, Catlett's Station and Manassas.

On June 25, the brigade was assigned as the 3rd Brigade, 3rd Division, I Corps, and ordered to form the rear guard of the Army of the Potomac as it marched north after Robert E. Lee's Army of Northern Virginia. The 15th marched with the brigade from Wolf Run Shoals on June 25, crossed the Potomac River on June 27, at Edward's Ferry, and moved north through Frederick and Creagerstown, Maryland. It was drawing near Gettysburg on July 1, when the 12th and 15th regiments were detached to guard the corps trains. The two regiments accompanied the corps trains to Rock Creek Church, near the battlefield.

After the battle, regiment participated in the pursuit of Lee's Army of Northern Virginia across the Catoctin mountains to Middletown, Maryland, then back over South Mountain, through Boonsboro, to Williamsport by July 14. The regiment marched to Harper's Ferry, across South Mountain again, and camped near Petersville, near Berlin (present-day Brunswick). On July 18, the regiment was released, taking a train from Berlin to Baltimore. It reached New York City on July 20, spent two uneventful days there during the Draft riots, then continued on to Brattleboro, where it mustered out on August 5.

Like the other regiments in the 2nd Vermont Brigade, dozens of newly discharged members from the 15th regiment enlisted again, predominantly in the regiments of the 1st Vermont Brigade, and the 17th Vermont Infantry.

== Final statement ==
Final Statement
Original members	939
Gain (recruits and transfers)	1
--- Aggregate	940
--- Losses ---
Transfer to other regiments	1
Died of disease	78
Honorably discharged	66
Deserted	1
Died from accident	1
--- Total losses	147
Mustered out at various times	793

== See also ==
- Vermont in the Civil War
