= 16th Independent Battery Indiana Light Artillery =

- Active: March 24, 1862 – July 5, 1865
- Country: United States
- Allegiance: Union
- Branch: Artillery
- Engagements: Battle of Cedar Mountain; Battle of Groveton; Second Battle of Bull Run; Battle of Antietam (reserves)

16th Indiana Battery Light Artillery was an artillery battery that served in the Union Army during the American Civil War.

== Service ==
The battery was organized in Lafayette, Indiana and mustered in at Indianapolis, Indiana on March 24, 1862, for three years service.

The battery was attached to Military District of Washington, D.C., June 1862. Artillery, II Corps, Army of Virginia, to September 1862. Artillery, 2nd Division, XII Corps, Army of the Potomac, to October 1862. Artillery, 2nd Brigade, Defenses North of the Potomac, Defenses of Washington, D.C., to February 1863. Fort Washington, Defenses of Washington, North of the Potomac, XXII Corps, to May 1864. 2nd Brigade, DeRussy's Division, XXII Corps, to July 1864. 3rd Brigade, DeRussy's Division, XXII Corps, to December 1864. 1st Brigade, DeRussy's Division, XXII Corps, to July 1865.

The 16th Indiana Battery Light Artillery mustered out July 5, 1865, in Indianapolis.

== Detailed service ==
Left Indiana for Washington, D.C., June 1. Duty at Capitol Hill until June 26. Ordered to join Banks in the Shenandoah Valley June 26, 1862. Pope's Campaign in northern Virginia July to September. Battle of Cedar Mountain August 9. Fords of the Rappahannock August 21–23. Battles of Groveton August 29 and Bull Run August 30. Maryland Campaign September 6–22. Battle of Antietam, September 16–17 (reserve). Ordered to Washington, D.C., and duty in the defenses of that city north and south of the Potomac River until June 1865. Repulse of Early's attack on Washington July 11–12, 1864. Ordered to Indianapolis, June 1865.

== Casualties ==
The battery lost a total of 11 enlisted men during service, all due to disease.

== See also ==
- List of Indiana Civil War regiments
- Indiana in the Civil War
