= 14th Vermont Infantry Regiment =

- Flag of Vermont, 1837–1923
- Active: October 21, 1862 to July 30, 1863
- Disbanded: July 30, 1863
- Allegiance: United States; Union
- Branch: United States Army; Union Army
- Type: Infantry
- Engagements: Battle of Gettysburg

Commanders
- Colonel: William T. Nichols

The 14th Vermont Infantry Regiment was a nine months' infantry regiment in the Union Army during the American Civil War. It served in the eastern theater, predominantly in the Defenses of Washington, from October 1862 to August 1863. It was a member of the 2nd Vermont Brigade.

== History ==
The 14th Vermont Infantry, a nine months regiment, raised as a result of President Lincoln's call on August 4, 1862, for additional troops due to the disastrous results of the Peninsula Campaign.

It was composed of volunteers from Addison, Rutland and Bennington Counties, as follows:

- Bennington, Co. A
- Wallingford, Co. B
- Manchester, Co. C
- Shoreham, Co. D
- Middlebury, Co. E
- Castleton, Co. F
- Bristol, Co. G
- Rutland, Co. H
- Vergennes, Co. I
- Danby, Co. K

The regiment's commander, Colonel William T. Nichols, of Rutland, had served with the 1st Vermont Infantry. Lieutenant Colonel Charles W. Rose, of Middlebury, had also served in the 1st regiment.

The 14th regiment went into camp at Brattleboro on October 6, 1862, and was mustered into United States service on October 21. It left Vermont on October 22, and arrived in Washington, D.C., on October 25; the next day it joined the 12th Vermont Infantry and some Maine regiments in Camp Chase, in Arlington, Virginia, then returned to camp on East Capital Hill, and on October 30 became part of the 2nd Vermont Brigade.

The regiment marched to Munson's Hill on October 30, and Hunting Creek on November 5, where it stayed until November 26. It performed picket duty at Occoquan Creek from November 26, to December 5, when it moved to "Camp Vermont" until December 12. It engaged in further picket duty near Fairfax Courthouse until January 20, 1863, subsequently moving to Fairfax Station until March 24. From March 24 to June 25, it was at Wolf Run Shoals, Union Mills, and on the Occoquan.

On June 25, the brigade was assigned as the 3rd Brigade, 3rd Division, I Corps, and ordered to form the rear guard of the Army of the Potomac as it marched north after Robert E. Lee's Army of Northern Virginia. The 14th marched with the brigade from Wolf Run Shoals on June 25, crossed the Potomac river on June 27, at Edward's Ferry, and moved north through Frederick City and Creagerstown, Maryland. On the morning of July 1, it left Westminster, Maryland, arrived on the battlefield at Gettysburg after dark on the first day of the battle, and camped in a wheat field to the left of Cemetery Hill.

== Gettysburg ==
On the afternoon of July 2, the 14th double-quicked to the rescue of a Union battery that was threatened by an attack by Confederate General A. P. Hill.

The 13th, 14th and 16th Vermont regiments played a pivotal role in the Union repulse of Pickett's Charge on the afternoon of July 3. The 13th and 16th regiments flanked James L. Kemper's brigade as it approached the copse of trees on Cemetery Ridge, then the 16th wheeled about, and joined by the 14th, stopped the advance of Cadmus M. Wilcox's brigade, capturing hundreds of Virginians. Lieutenant George Benedict, an aide to Brigadier General George J. Stannard, related General Abner Doubleday's reaction, saying he "waved his hat and shouted: 'Glory to God, glory to God! See the Vermonters go it!'"

After the battle, the 14th regiment participated in the pursuit of Lee's Army of Northern Virginia across the Catoctin mountains to Middletown, Maryland, then back over South Mountain, through Boonesboro, to Williamsport by July 14. The regiment marched to Harper's Ferry, across South Mountain again, and camped near Petersville, near Berlin. On July 18, the regiment was released, took a train from Berlin to Baltimore. It reached New York City on July 20. General Edward Canby, who commanded a small number of troops trying to contain the Draft riots that had been raging for four days, asked Colonel Nicholson to hold his regiment in the city for a few days. Colonel Nichols gathered his regiment and made an impassioned plea for them to remain, but the men demurred. The regiment continued its trip home, arrived in Brattleboro on July 21, and mustered out on July 30.

Like the other regiments in the 2nd Vermont Brigade, dozens of newly discharged members from the 14th regiment enlisted again, predominantly in the regiments of the 1st Vermont Brigade, and the 17th Vermont Infantry.

== Final statement ==
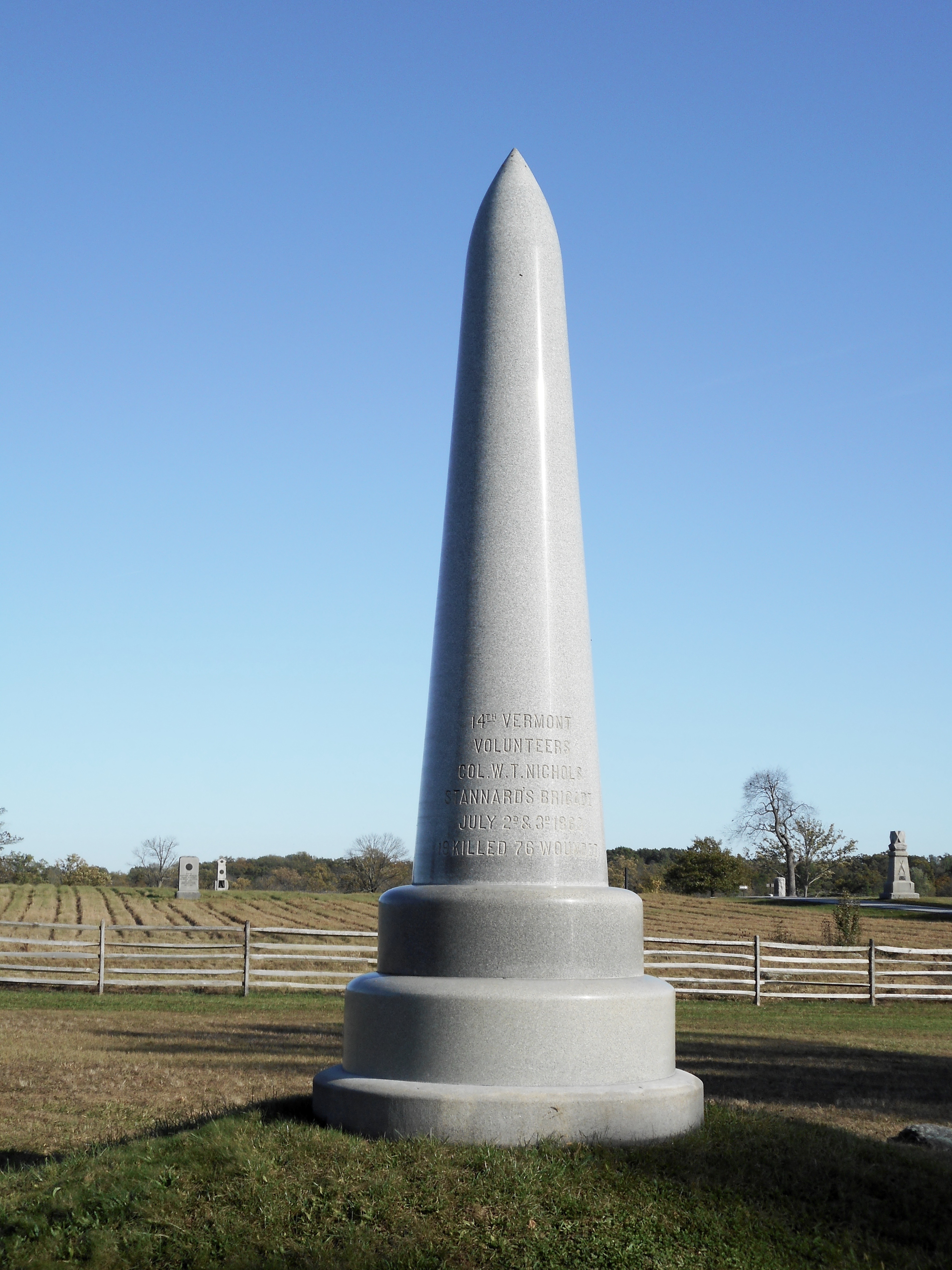
Monument to the 14th Vermont Volunteer Infantry Regiment at Gettysburg

Final Statement
Original members	960
Gain (recruits and transfers)	4
--- Aggregate	964
--- Losses ---
Killed in action	18
Died of wounds	9
Died of disease	39
Died in Confederate prisons	1
Murdered	1
Honorably discharged	71
Deserted	0
Transferred to Veteran Reserve Corps	1
--- Total Losses	140
Mustered out at various times	824
Total wounded	65

== See also ==
- Vermont in the Civil War
