= 12th Vermont Infantry Regiment =

- Flag of Vermont, 1837–1923
- Active: October 4, 1862 to July 14, 1863
- Disbanded: July 14, 1863
- Allegiance: United States; Union
- Branch: United States Army; Union Army
- Type: Infantry

Commanders
- Colonel: Asa P. Blunt

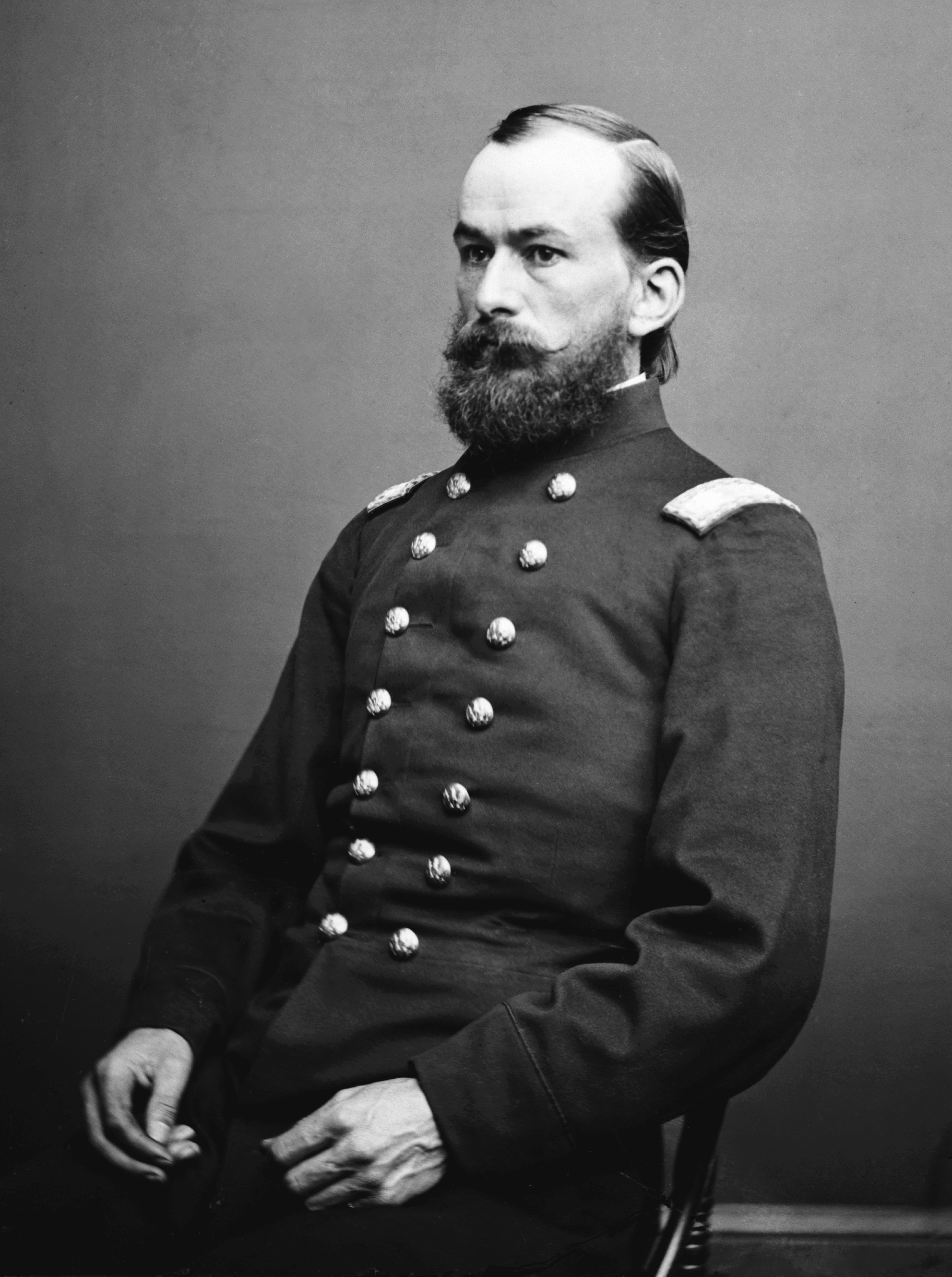
Asa P. Blunt commanded the 12th during its nine months in 1863

The 12th Vermont Infantry Regiment was a nine months' infantry regiment in the Union Army during the American Civil War. It served in the eastern theater, predominantly in the Defenses of Washington, from October 1862 to July 1863. It was a member of the 2nd Vermont Brigade.

== History ==
The 12th Vermont Infantry, a nine months regiment, raised as a result of President Lincoln's call on August 4, 1862, for additional troops due to the disastrous results of the Peninsula Campaign.

It was composed of volunteers from ten volunteer militia companies as follows:

- West Windsor Guards, Co. A
- Woodstock Light Infantry, Co. B
- Howard Guard of Burlington, Co. C
- July 14, 1863 has Company G under the command of Ebenzer J. Ornisbill (spelling ?)
- Tunbridge Light Infantry, Co. D
- Ransom Guards of St. Albans, Co. E
- New England Guard of Northfield, Co. F
- Allen Grays of Brandon, Co. G
- Bradford Guards, Co. H
- Saxton's River Light Infantry of Rockingham, Co. I
- Rutland Light Guard, Co. K

Colonel Asa P. Blunt, previously of the 3rd and 6th Vermont regiments, was selected to command the regiment. Lieutenant Colonel Roswell Farnham and Major Levi G. Kingsley had held commissions in the 1st Vermont Infantry, along with a total of 65 officers and men.

The regiment went into camp at Brattleboro on September 25, 1862, and was mustered into United States service on October 4. It left Vermont on October 7, and arrived in Washington, D.C., on October 10, and went into camp on East Capital Hill. On October 30 it became part of the 2nd Vermont Brigade, which also included the 13th, 14th, 15th and 16th Vermont Infantry regiments.

Colonel Blunt, as ranking colonel, commanded the brigade until the arrival of Brigadier General Edwin H. Stoughton, on December 7.

Stoughton was not popular with the officers and men of the brigade, so when he was captured by Confederate partisan John S. Mosby on March 9, 1863, few mourned his loss. Colonel Blunt assumed command of the brigade again, turning it over to the new brigade commander, Brigadier General George J. Stannard, on April 20, who led the brigade until the Battle of Gettysburg.

The regiment marched to Munson's Hill on October 30, and Hunting Creek the next day, where it stayed until December 12, in 'Camp Vermont.' It was engaged in picket duty near Fairfax Courthouse from December 12 to January 20, 1863, participating in a repulse of J.E.B. Stuart's cavalry on December 29. The regiment was stationed at Wolf Run Shoals from January 20 to May 1, performed railroad guard duty at Warrenton Junction until May 7, and camped near Rappahannock Station until May 18. From then until June 1, it camped near Bristoe and Catlett's Station. For the majority of June, it was at Union Mills.

On June 25, the brigade was assigned as the 3rd Brigade, 3rd Division, I Corps, and ordered to form the rear guard of the Army of the Potomac as it marched north after Robert E. Lee's Army of Northern Virginia. The 12th marched with the brigade from Wolf Run Shoals on June 25, crossed the Potomac river on June 27, at Edward's Ferry, and moved north through Frederick City and Creagerstown, Maryland. It was drawing near Gettysburg on July 1, when the 12th and 15th regiments were detached to guard the corps trains.

The regiment accompanied the corps trains to Rock Creek Church, near the battlefield, and two companies of the 12th went forward to protect ammunition trains on the Taneytown road.

After the battle, the regiment moved south to Westminster, Maryland, then served as guards for a train of 2,500 Confederate prisoners who were taken to Baltimore, Maryland. Departing Baltimore, the regiment traveled to Brattleboro, Vermont, where it arrived on July 9. It was mustered out on July 14, 1863.

Dozens of newly discharged members of the regiment enlisted again, predominantly in the regiments of the 1st Vermont Brigade, and the 17th Vermont Infantry.

== Final Statement ==
Final Statement
Original members	998
Gain (recruits and transfers)	7
--- Aggregate	1005
--- Losses ---
Died of disease	63
Honorably discharged	75
Deserted	4
Transferred to Veteran Reserve Corps and other organizations	2
--- Total Losses	144
Mustered out at various times	861

== See also ==
Vermont in the Civil War
