= 16th Vermont Infantry Regiment =

- Flag of Vermont, 1837–1923
- Active: October 23, 1862 to July 30, 1863
- Disbanded: July 30, 1863
- Allegiance: United States; Union
- Branch: United States Army; Union Army
- Type: Infantry
- Engagements: Battle of Gettysburg

Commanders
- Colonel: Wheelock G. Veazey

The 16th Vermont Infantry Regiment (or 16th VVI) was a nine months' infantry regiment in the Union Army during the American Civil War. It served in the eastern theater, predominantly in the Defenses of Washington, from October 1862 to August 1863. It was a member of the 2nd Vermont Brigade.

== Recruitment ==
The 16th Vermont Infantry, a nine months regiment, was raised as a result of President Abraham Lincoln's call on August 4, 1862, for additional troops due to the disastrous results of the Peninsula Campaign.

It was recruited in Windsor and Windham Counties, the two southernmost counties in the state, and rendezvoused in the following towns:

- Bethel, Co. A, recruited by Asa G. Foster.
- Brattleboro, Co. B, Robert B. Arms.
- Ludlow, Co. C, Asa G. Foster.
- Townshend, Co. D, David Ball.
- Springfield, Co. E, Alvin C. Mason.
- Wilmington, Co. F, Henry F. Dix.
- Barnard, Co. G, Harvey N. Bruce.
- Felchville, Co. H, Joseph C. Sawyer.
- Williamsville, Co. I, Lyman E. Knapp.
- Chester, Co. K, Samuel Hutchinson.

== History ==
On September 27, 1862, the officers listed above met at Bellows Falls and elected Wheelock G. Veazey, of Springfield, colonel, Charles Cummings, of Brattleboro, lieutenant colonel, and William Rounds, of Chester, major.

The regiment rendezvoused at Brattleboro on October 9, and was mustered into the United States service on October 23, with 949 officers and men. The left Brattleboro on October 24, and arrived in Washington, D.C., on the morning of October 27, going into camp near the other four regiments that were then formed into the 2nd Vermont Brigade.

=== In the field ===
The regiment marched to Munson Hill on October 30, then to Hunting Creek on November 5, where it remained until December 12. It next served on picket duty near Fairfax Court House until January 20, 1863, where it participated in the repulse of Stuart's cavalry on December 29, 1862. The regiment was next stations at Union Mills from March 24 to June 1, then Bristoe Station, Catlett's Station and Manassas until June 15, when it returned to Union Mills.

On June 25, the brigade was assigned as the 3rd Brigade, 3rd Division, I Corps, and ordered to form the rear guard of the Army of the Potomac as it marched north after Robert E. Lee's Army of Northern Virginia. The 16th marched with the brigade from Wolf Run Shoals on June 25, crossed the Potomac river on June 27, at Edward's Ferry, and moved north through Frederick City and Creagerstown, Maryland. It was drawing near Gettysburg on July 1, when the 12th and 15th regiments were detached to guard the corps trains. The two regiments accompanied the corps trains to Rock Creek Church, near the battlefield. The remaining regiments of the brigade arrived on the battlefield at Gettysburg after dark on the first day of the battle, and camped in a wheat field to the left of Cemetery Hill.

=== Gettysburg ===
On July 2, the brigade helped reinforce picket lines along Cemetery Ridge that were threatened by an attack by Confederate General A. P. Hill.

The 13th, 14th and 16th Vermont regiments played a pivotal role in the Union repulse of Pickett's Charge on the afternoon of July 3. The 13th and 16th regiments flanked James L. Kemper's brigade as it approached the copse of trees on Cemetery Ridge, then the 16th wheeled about, and joined by the 14th, stopped the advance of Cadmus M. Wilcox's brigade, capturing hundreds of Virginians. Lieutenant George Benedict, an aide to Brigadier General George J. Stannard, related General Abner Doubleday's reaction, saying he "waved his hat and shouted: 'Glory to God, glory to God! See the Vermonters go it!'"

=== Final days ===
After the battle, due to Brigadier General George J. Stannard's wounding, Colonel Veazey assumed command of the brigade, and it participated in the pursuit of Lee's Army of Northern Virginia across the Catoctin mountains to Middletown, Maryland, then back over South Mountain, through Boonesboro, to Williamsport by July 14. On the previous day, a picket detail of 150 from the 16th participated in a skirmish with rebel pickets, in which two soldiers were wounded. This was the last known action of the brigade.

The 14th, 15th and 16th regiments marched to Harper's Ferry, across South Mountain again, and camped near Petersville, near Berlin. On July 18, the regiment was released, took a train from Berlin to Baltimore. It reached New York City on July 20. After spending a few uneventful days in that riot-torn city, assisting with security, the regiment continued its trip home, arrived in Brattleboro on July 21, and mustered out on July 30.

Like the other regiments in the 2nd Vermont Brigade, dozens of newly discharged members from the 14th regiment enlisted again, predominantly in the regiments of the 1st Vermont Brigade, and the 17th Vermont Infantry.

== Medal of Honor ==
- Wheelock G. Veazey, colonel, "rapidly assembled his regiment and charged the enemy's flank; charged front under heavy fire, and charged and destroyed a Confederate brigade, all this with new troops in their first battle," at Gettysburg on July 3, 1863.

== Notable members ==
- Henry A. Fletcher, Lieutenant governor of Vermont
- Kittredge Haskins, US Congressman
- Lyman Enos Knapp, governor of the District of Alaska
- Crosby P. Miller, US Army brigadier general
- William H. Walker, associate justice of the Vermont Supreme Court

== Final statement ==
Final Statement
Original members	964
Gain (recruits and transfers)	4
--- Aggregate	968
--- Losses ---
Killed in action	16
Died of wounds	8
Died of disease	48
Died in Confederate prisons	1
Total deaths	73
Honorably discharged	59
Deserted	2
Promoted to U.S. Army	2
Appointed Cadet at West Point	1
--- Total Losses	137
Mustered out at various times	831
Total wounded	87
Total taken prisoner	4

== See also ==
- Vermont in the Civil War
