= John Lonergan =

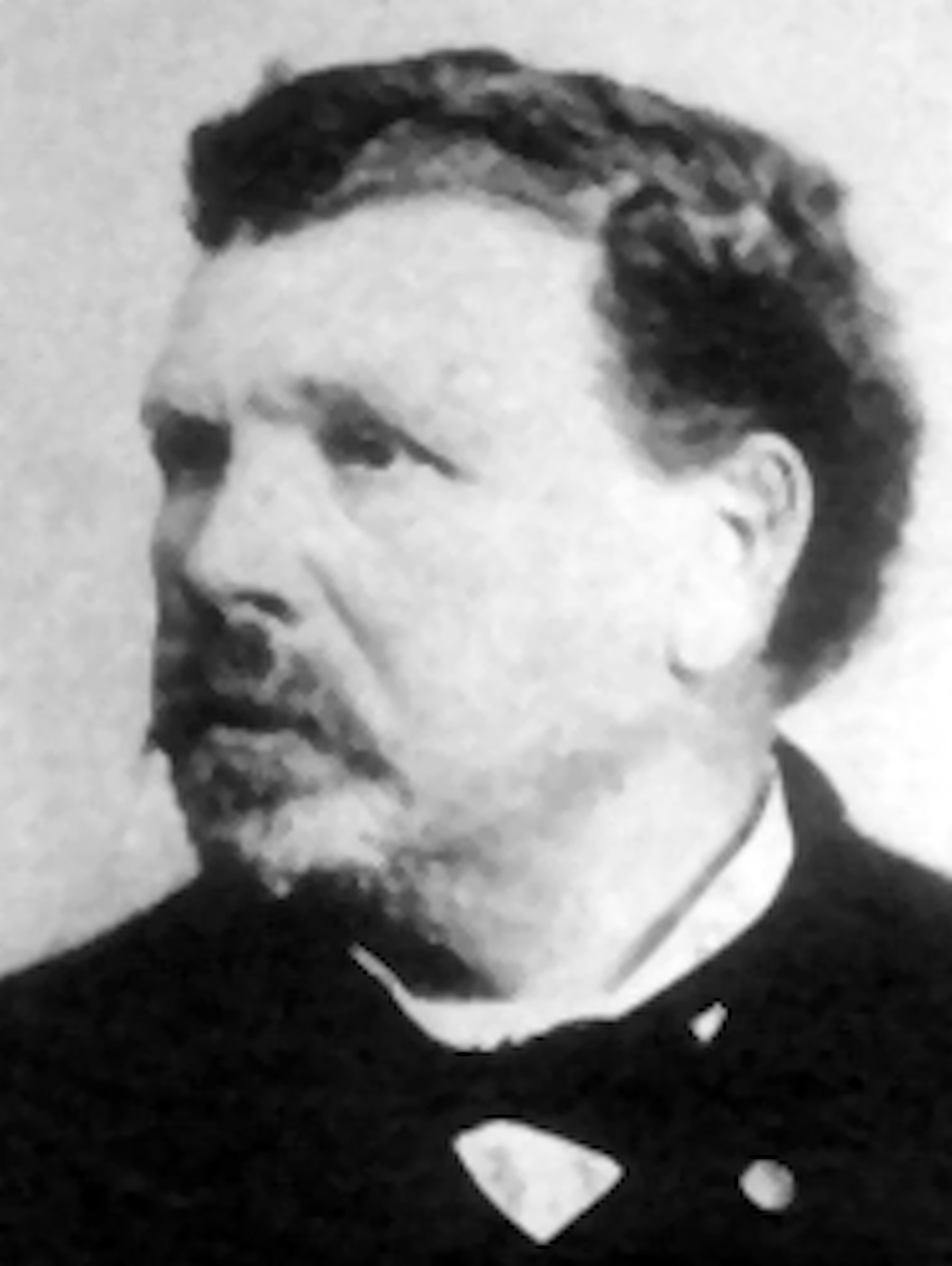
- Born: April 7, 1839; Carrick-on-Suir, Ireland
- Died: August 6, 1902 (aged 66); Montreal, Quebec, Canada
- Military career
- Allegiance: United States of America; Union
- Branch: United States Army; Union Army
- Service years: 1862 – 1863, 1865
- Rank: Captain
- Units: Company A, 13th Vermont Infantry
- Conflicts: American Civil War
- Awards: Medal of Honor

John Lonergan (April 7, 1839 – August 6, 1902) was a captain in the Union Army and a Medal of Honor recipient for his actions in the Battle of Gettysburg during the American Civil War.

== Life ==
Lonergan was born in Carrick-on-Suir, Ireland on April 7, 1838. His family emigrated to the United States when he was a child, and he lived most of his life in Burlington, Vermont. During the American Civil War, he raised three companies to fight on the Union side, mostly composed of men of Irish birth or Irish parentage. He served as a captain in Company A of the 13th Vermont Infantry.

After the war, he was appointed a deputy customs collector in Montreal, Quebec, Canada. He resigned from his position in December 1897 due to heart disease. He died in Montreal on August 6, 1902.

== Medal of Honor citation ==
Rank and organization: Captain, Company A, 13th Vermont Infantry. Place and date: At Gettysburg, Pa., July 2, 1863. Entered service at: Burlington, Vt. Birth: Ireland. Date of issue: October 28, 1893.

Citation:

Gallantry in the recapture of 4 guns and the capture of 2 additional guns from the enemy; also the capture of a number of prisoners.

== See also ==
- List of Medal of Honor recipients for the Battle of Gettysburg
- List of American Civil War Medal of Honor recipients: G–L
