= 2nd Vermont Brigade =

12th Vermont Infantry Regiment
- Flag of Vermont, 1837–1923
- Active: 1862–1863
- Allegiance: United States; Union
- Branch: United States Army; Union Army
- Type: Infantry

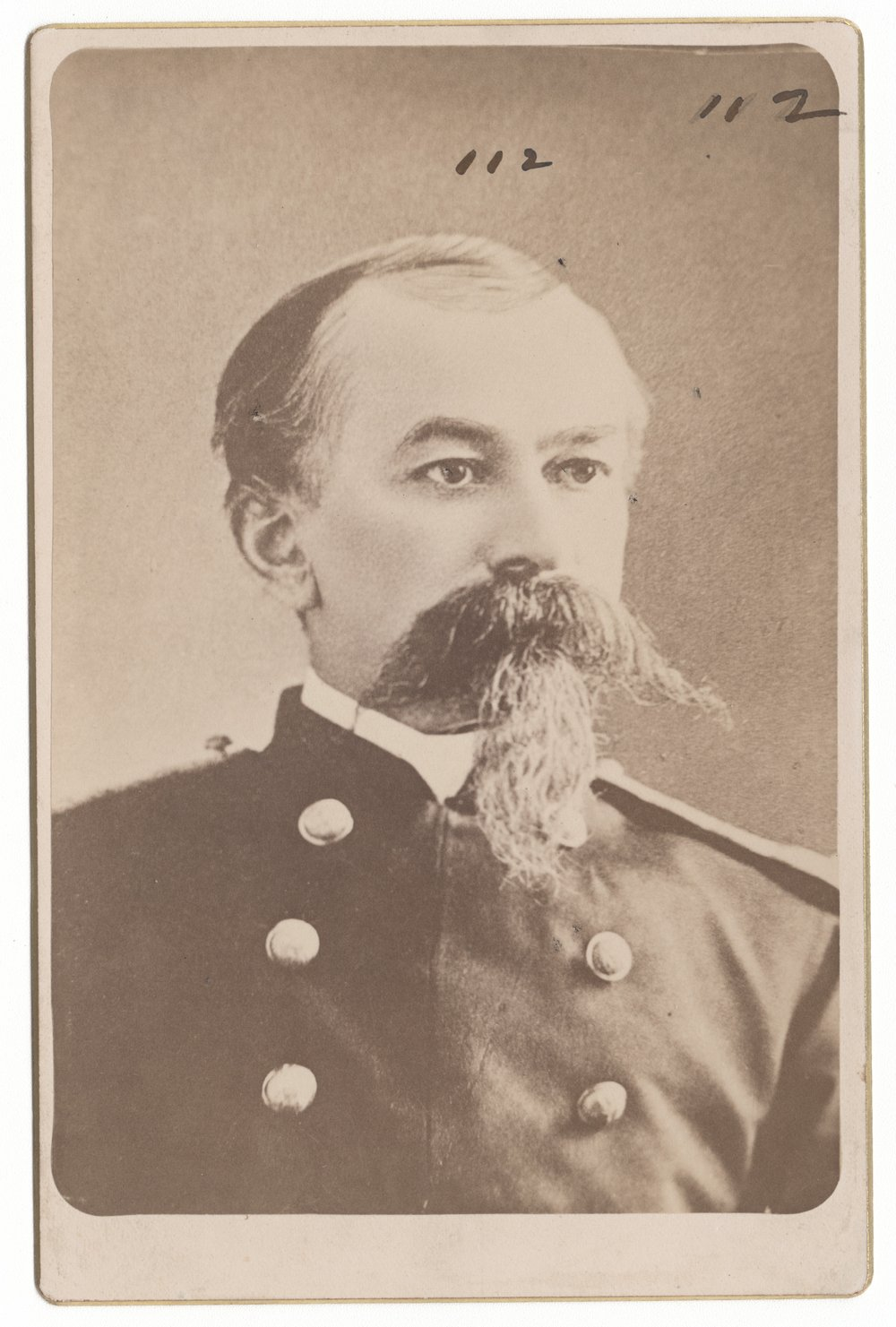
Colonel Asa P. Blunt

The 2nd Vermont Brigade was an infantry brigade in the Union Army of the Potomac during the American Civil War.

== Composition and commanders ==
The brigade was composed of the 12th, 13th, 14th, 15th and 16th Vermont Infantry regiments, all nine-month regiments raised as a result of President Lincoln's call on August 4, 1862, for additional troops due to the disastrous results of the Peninsula Campaign.

The brigade was organized on October 27, 1862, after the five regiments had arrived in Washington, D.C. The brigade's first commander was Colonel Asa P. Blunt, commander of the 12th regiment, who was the ranking colonel. Brigadier General Edwin H. Stoughton arrived on December 7, and assumed command of the brigade.

Stoughton was not popular with the officers and men of the brigade, so when he was captured by Confederate partisan John S. Mosby on March 9, 1863, few mourned his loss. Colonel Blunt assumed command of the brigade again, turning it over to the new brigade commander, Brigadier General George J. Stannard, on April 20, who led the brigade until the Battle of Gettysburg.

== Defense of Washington ==
The brigade spent most of its short career in the defenses of Washington, in and around Fairfax, Virginia. From October 1862 until February 1863, it served as the 2nd Brigade, (Brigadier General John J.) Abercrombie's Division, Military District of Washington. In a reorganization in February 1863, the division came under command of Brigadier General Silas Casey and the military district was reorganized as the XXII Corps. In April, Abercrombie resumed command of the division.

The 13th, 14th and 15th regiments were stationed at Camp Chase, Arlington, Virginia until October 28, then joined the 12th and 16th at East Capital Hill by October 30, when the brigade moved to Munson's Hill, thence to Hunting Creek several days later, where it conducted picket duty on Occoquan Creek, until mid-December. On December 12, the brigade moved to Fairfax Court House, where it remained until late March 1863, when it moved to Wolf Run Shoals. Several of the regiments were camped independently or in pairs at Bristoe Station, Catlett's Station, Manassas, Warrenton Junction and Rappahannock Station until late June, when they were consolidated at Union Mills in mid- to late-June.

The only excitement to break the tedium of picket duty occurred on December 29, 1862, when Fairfax Court House was attacked by J.E.B. Stuart's cavalry, and March 9, 1863, when Stoughton was captured. But all that was to change when Lee's Army of Northern Virginia started marching north in late June.

== Gettysburg Campaign ==
On June 25, the brigade was assigned as the 3rd Brigade, 3rd Division, I Corps, and ordered to follow the rest of the Army of the Potomac north. The 12th and 15th regiments were detached at Westminster, Maryland, on July 1, to guard supply trains, and the remaining regiments arrived on the battlefield late that evening, and camped to the rear of Cemetery Hill.

On the morning of July 2, the brigade remained massed in the rear of Cemetery Hill. In the afternoon, Stannard was given command of the infantry supporting batteries on the left flank. The brigade was moved forward some, and the 14th and 16th regiments engaged to check advancing Confederates and help close up the Union line on the left flank of Cemetery Hill. The 13th regiment engaged some Georgian troops who were trying to capture a battery, approaching the Emmitsburg road. Members of the regiment, led by Captain John Lonergan, approached and surrounded the Codori farm house, and captured 80 soldiers from an Alabama regiment. Colonel Wheelock G. Veazey of the 16th regiment was detailed as the division field officer of the day.

On the morning of July 3, members of the 16th regiment were stationed as pickets forward of Cemetery Hill. In the afternoon, after a two-hour artillery duel, Confederate General Robert E. Lee launched what has become known Pickett's Charge. The Vermont pickets were withdrawn, and as the Confederates approached Cemetery Hill, the three Vermont regiments flanked the Confederate troops first flanking Pickett's division by wheeling two units to the right and then doing the same to two detached Confederate brigades by wheeling two regiments to the left. Stannard's brigade inflicted severe casualties on the advancing Confederate regiments and forcing some of Pickett's men to redeploy covering their right flank. History recalls this battle as the high-water mark of the Confederacy. Three years later, at St. Albans, Vermont, General George G. Meade, commanding the Army of the Potomac at Gettysburg, said "there was no individual body of men who rendered greater service at a critical moment than the comparatively raw troops commanded by General Stannard."

== After the battle ==
Colonel Francis V. Randall assumed command of the brigade after Stannard was wounded. On July 4, the 12th regiment was sent to Baltimore, Maryland to transport and guard prisoners. The 13th, 14th, 15th and 16th regiments participated in the pursuit of Lee's Army of Northern Virginia starting July 4, but broke off and were ordered back to Vermont between July 8 and July 18. Some of them were assigned to New York City to assist in controlling the Draft riots, but by August 10, all five regiments had mustered out at Brattleboro, Vermont.

A total of 4,847 men served in the five regiments of the brigade. It suffered at total of 356 casualties during its career, including 70 killed or mortally wounded at Gettysburg, 282 lost to disease, 2 who died in Confederate prisons, 1 who committed suicide, and 1 who was murdered.
