= George J. Stannard =

United States Army officer (1820–1886)

George Jerrison Stannard
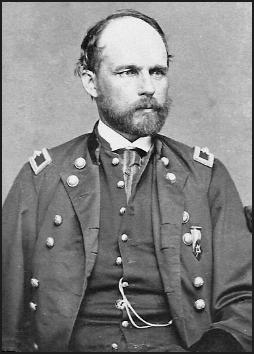
- Brig. Gen. George Stannard
- Born: October 20, 1820; Georgia, Vermont
- Died: June 1, 1886 (aged 65); Washington, D.C.
- Burial place: Lakeview Cemetery, Burlington, Vermont
- Military career
- Allegiance: United States of America; Union
- Branch: United States Army; Union Army
- Service years: 1861 - 1866
- Rank: Brevet Major General
- Commands: 9th Vermont Infantry; 2nd Vermont Brigade
- Conflicts: American Civil War
- Other work: United States Revenue Collector for Vermont

George Jerrison Stannard (October 20, 1820 – June 1, 1886) was a Vermont farmer, teacher, government official and Union general in the American Civil War.

== Early life ==
Stannard was born in Georgia, Vermont, the son of Samuel Stannard and Rebecca (Petty) Stannard. He was educated in the public schools of Georgia, and attended academies in Georgia and Bakersfield. Stannard worked as a farmer, teacher, and foundry operator in St. Albans. Stannard also served as a noncommissioned officer during the Vermont militia's activation for the Upper Canada Rebellion in 1838. In 1856, he participated in organizing a new militia unit in St. Albans, the Ransom Guards, and was chosen as their first lieutenant. In 1858, he was selected as commander of the 4th Vermont Militia Regiment with the rank of colonel.

== Civil War ==
=== Early service ===
In June 1861, Stannard was elected lieutenant colonel of the 2nd Vermont Volunteer Infantry. Some local residents claimed that he was the first Vermonter to volunteer for duty in the Civil War, based on his immediate reply by telegram to the governor's first call for troops. He fought with the 2nd Vermont at the First Battle of Bull Run in July 1861, successfully enough that he was offered command of the newly forming 3rd Vermont, but he turned it down because he thought he had not served long enough to qualify. During the Battle of Williamsburg in the Peninsula Campaign the following year, Brig. Gen. Winfield S. Hancock's report indicated that Stannard was responsible for securing a bridge that was crucial to the battle. A week after the campaign, on July 9, 1862, he was appointed colonel of the 9th Vermont Infantry.

During the Maryland Campaign in September 1862, 9th Vermont was part of the Federal garrison that was forced to surrender to Stonewall Jackson at Harpers Ferry. Stannard was conspicuous in the defense of Bolivar Heights against Jackson's attack. Col. William H. Trimble, his brigade commander, had Stannard accompany him in an inspection of the Union lines in that sector. Both thought the southern end of the line weak. Stannard clearly had no confidence in Col. Dixon Miles, the garrison commander, but he displayed his own coolness under fire by watching for Confederate artillery action in order to tell his men to drop to the ground. Stannard is reported to have tried to extract his regiment from Harpers Ferry before the surrender could take effect, but he was intercepted with orders to yield to the Confederates.

Upon his exchange in January 1863, Stannard returned to Vermont. He was appointed brigadier general on March 11, 1863, and given command of the 2nd Vermont Brigade in April, joining it in its camps in the defenses of Washington, D.C. The brigade consisted of the 12th, 13th, 14th, 15th, and 16th Vermont Infantry regiments. Stannard's immediate predecessor had been Brig. Gen. Edwin H. Stoughton, who had been captured in his bed at Fairfax Court House during a raid by partisan ranger Col. John S. Mosby. Stannard drilled his new brigade strenuously and his "quiet but effective" command style made him well respected by the men and significantly improved morale in the Brigade.

=== Gettysburg ===
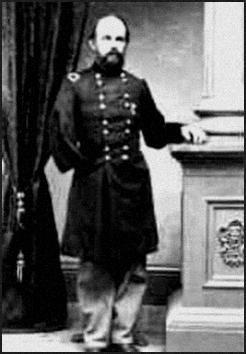
Stannard as a brigadier general in the Union Army; note the empty right sleeve.

During the Gettysburg campaign, the 2nd Vermont Brigade was one of four brigades sent from the Capital to join the Army of the Potomac as it pursued Robert E. Lee into Pennsylvania. Stannard's command left the Washington defenses on June 25. Marching 18 miles a day for a week, the brigade reported to the 3rd Division of the I Corps. The I Corps had fought, and lost, heavily in the first day of the Battle of Gettysburg, July 1, 1863. Three regiments of Stannard's men arrived only after the fighting ceased that day, adding to the division's depleted ranks. (The other two regiments, the 12th and 15th Vermont, had been detached to guard wagon trains.)

On July 2, Stannard was brigade officer of the day, leaving immediate command of his troops to Col. Francis V. Randall of the 13th Vermont. Although the brigade was withdrawn behind Cemetery Hill, not participating in the initial defense against the attack by Confederate Brig. Gen. Ambrose R. Wright on Cemetery Ridge, it was sent to recover guns lost to Confederate attacks. The Vermonters recovered these guns despite resistance from Wright's Georgians.

The brigade's greatest fight, however, was on July 3, where it was one of the principal defenders against Pickett's Charge. The Vermonters lost men to sharpshooter fire and to the bombardment preceding the Confederate attack. As the assault approached Cemetery Ridge, Stannard swung two of his regiments (the 13th and 16th Vermont) out at a 90° angle, pouring deadly flanking fire into Brig. Gen. James L. Kemper's brigade, one of the critical factors that defeated the Confederate attack. Minutes later, the unconnected assaults by the Confederate brigades of Brig. Gen. Cadmus M. Wilcox and Col. David Lang approached the Union line to the south of the Vermont Brigade. Stannard once again wheeled two regiments (the 14th and 16th Vermont) and repeated his tactic of flanking fire to repulse the assault. Stannard was wounded in his right thigh by an artillery shell fragment, but stayed on the field until the end of the battle. Col. Randall commanded the brigade until it was mustered out of service.

Maj. Gen. Winfield S. Hancock, commander of the II Corps (who was in operational command of the defense against Pickett) wrote in his report, "The troops of General Stannard behaved with spirit at the Battle of Gettysburg. They were well ordered and well and vigorously handled by General Stannard and his subordinate officers, who did not hesitate to put them in front of the fight, and to keep them there until the battle was decided." In the middle of the battle, Stannard's corps commander, Maj. Gen. Abner Doubleday observed the repulse of Pickett's advance, waved his hat in excitement, and exclaimed "Glory to God! Glory to God! See the Vermonters go it!". After the battle, he wrote "I can only say that they performed perhaps the most brilliant feat during the war. For they broke the desperate charge of Pickett, saved the day and with it, the whole North from invasion and devastation."

The Battle of Gettysburg and Stannard's Brigade are mentioned in the third chapter of MacKinlay Kantor's Pulitzer Prize-winning novel "Andersonville" (1955).

=== Service with the Army of the James ===
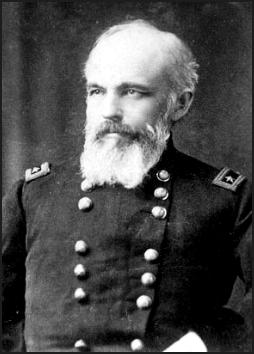
Stannard as a major general in the Union Army

Stannard was wounded too severely to return immediately to field command, so he left his brigade and returned to Vermont to recover. During this time he briefly commanded the post of New York City. When he returned to duty, it was to Maj. Gen. Benjamin Butler's Army of the James. When Brig. Gen. Charles A. Heckman was captured at the Battle of Proctor's Creek, Stannard replaced him in command of the 1st Brigade, 2nd Division, XVIII Corps. In the Battle of Cold Harbor, he was wounded in the left thigh but continued to lead his brigade through the Second Battle of Petersburg. He assumed command of the 1st Division, XVIII Corps, during the Siege of Petersburg and was conspicuous at the Battle of Chaffin's Farm. His division led the attack on Fort Harrison. Stannard was again wounded holding the captured fort against a Confederate counterattack, requiring the amputation of his right arm. He received a brevet promotion to major general for his actions during the assault on Fort Harrison.

== Postbellum ==
Stannard was then assigned to light duty in Vermont for the remainder of the war. In 1866, he served briefly as assistant commissioner for the Bureau of Refugees, Freedmen and Abandoned Lands in Maryland. He resigned from the Army in June 1866 and worked as a customs official in Vermont. From 1881 until his death, he served on the staff of the Doorkeeper of the United States House of Representatives. He died in Washington, D.C., and is buried at Lakeview Cemetery in Burlington, Vermont. A statue of Stannard, sculpted by Karl Gerhardt, stands atop the Vermont Memorial at the Gettysburg Battlefield. Another statue of Stannard stands in Lakeview Cemetery. The town of Stannard in Caledonia County, Vermont, was named after the general. He also is commemorated on a tablet inside the First Congregational Church of Bennington.

== See also ==
- List of American Civil War generals (Union)
