= 17th Vermont Infantry Regiment =

- Flag of Vermont, 1837–1923
- Active: March 1864 to July 14, 1865
- Disbanded: July 14, 1865
- Allegiance: United States; Union
- Branch: United States Army; Union Army
- Type: Infantry
- Size: 1,137
- Engagements: Battle of the Wilderness; Battle of Spotsylvania Court House; Battle of North Anna; Battle of Totopotomoy Creek; Battle of Cold Harbor; Siege of Petersburg; Battle of Jerusalem Plank Road; Battle of Peebles' Farm; Battle of Hatcher's Run

Commanders
- Colonel: Francis V. Randall

Insignia
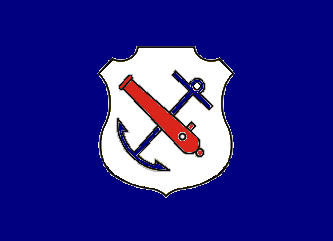
- 2nd Division, IX Corps

The 17th Vermont Infantry Regiment was a three years' infantry regiment in the Union Army during the American Civil War. It served in the IX Corps in the eastern theater from March 1864 to July 1865.

The regiment was mustered into United States service in companies between March and August 1864 at Brattleboro, Vermont.

Francis V. Randall, a veteran of the 2nd and 13th Vermont, was colonel and regimental commander. Charles Cummings and Lyman Enos Knapp were lieutenant colonels. James Stevens Peck, a 13th Vermont veteran, was the regimental adjutant with the rank of Major. Stephen F. Brown, a veteran of the 13th Vermont, was commissioned as Captain and commander of Company A.

It was engaged in, or present at, the Wilderness, Spotsylvania, North Anna, Totopotomoy Creek, Cold Harbor, Petersburg, Weldon Railroad, Poplar Spring church, and Hatcher's Run in the Overland Campaign.

The regiment lost men during service: 133 men killed and mortally wounded, 3 died from accident, 33 died in Confederate prisons, and 57 died from disease; a total loss of 226 men.

The regiment mustered out of service on July 14, 1865.
