= Wolf Run Shoals =

Occoquan River crossing point

Coordinates: 38°43′30.8″N 77°21′36.8″W

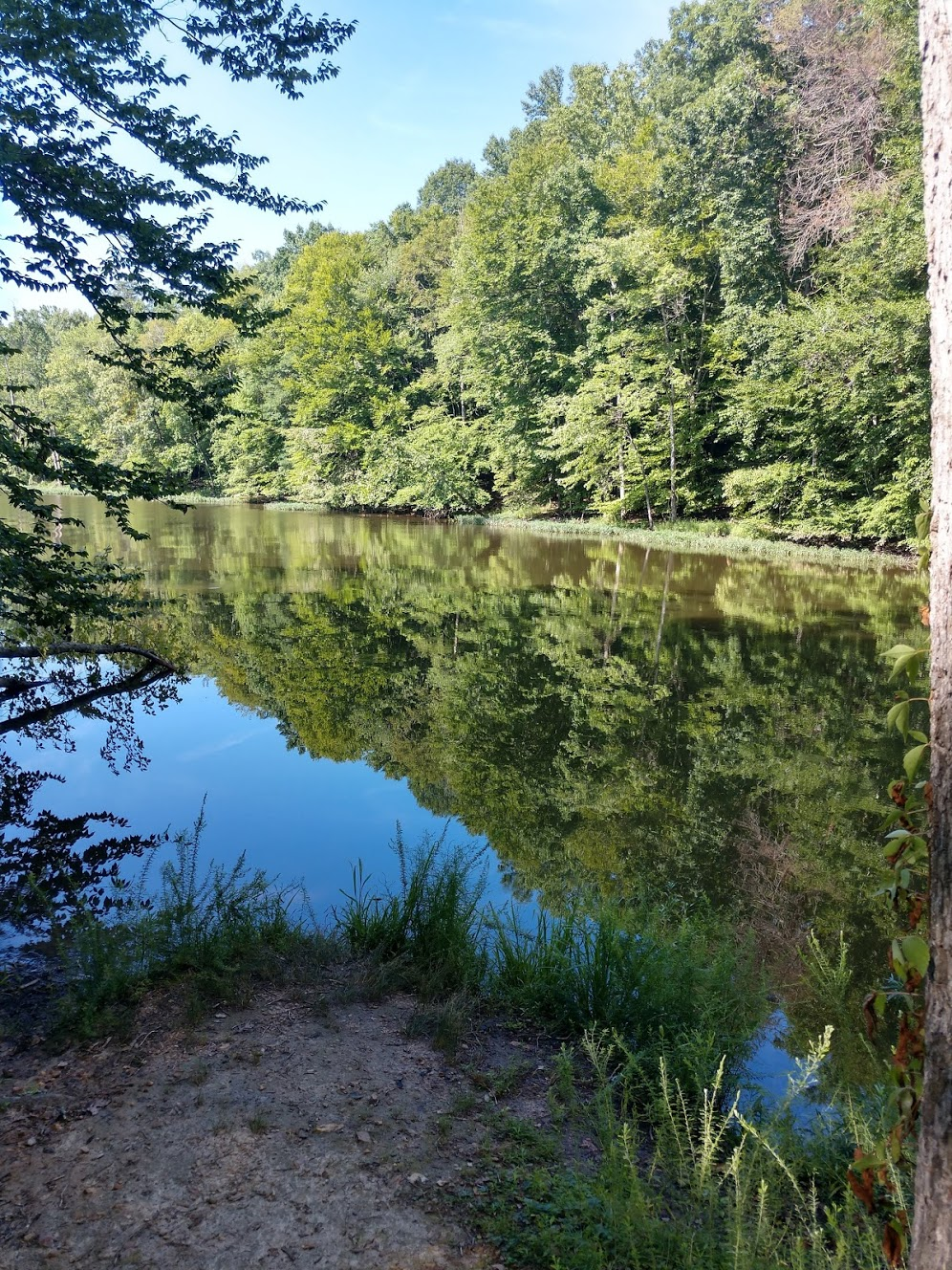
Wolf Run Shoals on the Occoquan River as it appeared in July 2019

Wolf Run Shoals was an important crossing point on the Occoquan River in northern Virginia between Alexandria and Richmond during the 18th and 19th centuries. It consisted of three islands and a mill, now submerged under the Occoquan due to higher water levels following damming for flood control, water supply, and power generation. It is located near the unincorporated communities of Butts Corner, Makleys Corner, and Farrs Corner in southern Fairfax County, Virginia.

== History ==
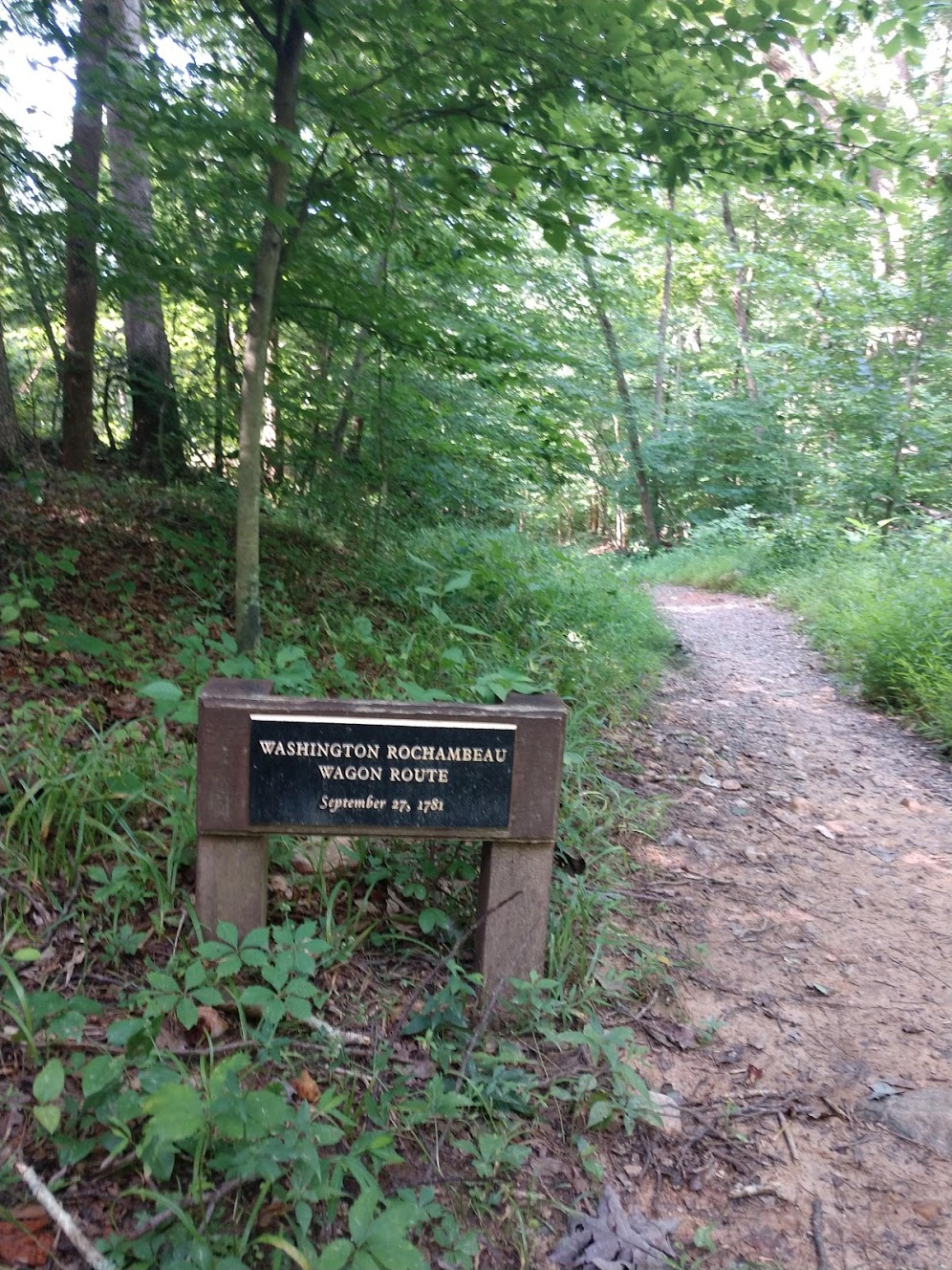
Washington Rochambeau Wagon Road trail as it appeared in July 2019

During the American Revolutionary War on September 27, 1781, Wolf Run Shoals was the site of the southerly crossing of a combined American-French force under General George Washington and Count Rochambeau on their way to the Siege of Yorktown. It was also the site of multiple Civil War crossings by both Union and Confederate forces. Confederate General Wade Hampton's regiments encamped and picketed on the south side during the winter of 1861-2 until March 1863, while the Army of the Potomac's Second, Twelfth, and Sixth Corps forded north here in June 1863 en route to what became the Battle of Gettysburg. Shortly thereafter, Confederate General JEB Stuart's Army of Northern Virginia cavalry also crossed when the 2nd Vermont Brigade withdrew on orders and left the ford unguarded.

== Present day ==
Today Wolf Run Shoals is only an historical and recreational site located in Fountainhead Regional Park, accessible on the northern side from Wolf Run Shoals Road in Fairfax County. An historical marker was dedicated in Clifton, Virginia on June 21, 2014.
