= List of places in Arkansas: Y =

Arkansas State Seal

This list of current cities, towns, unincorporated communities, and other recognized places in the U.S. state of Arkansas whose name begins with the letter Y. It also includes information on the number and names of counties in which the place lies, and its lower and upper zip code bounds, if applicable.

== Cities and Towns ==
Name of place	Number of counties	Principal county	Lower zip code	Upper zip code
Yale	1	Johnson County	72752	
Yancopin	1	Desha County	71674	
Yancy	1	Hempstead County		
Yarbro	1	Mississippi County	72319	
Yardelle	1	Newton County	72685	
Y City	1	Scott County	71965	
Yeager	1	Monroe County		
Yellow Banks	1	Poinsett County		
Yellow Bayou	1	Chicot County		
Yellville	1	Marion County	72687	
Yellville	1	Marion County		
Yocana	1	Polk County	71953	
Yocum	1	Carroll County		
Yoder	1	Arkansas County		
Yoestown	1	Crawford County	72921	
Yorktown	1	Lincoln County	71678	
Young	1	Nevada County		
Young Gravelly	1	Yell County		
Youngstown	1	Drew County		
Yukon	1	Desha County	71677	

== Townships ==
Name of place	Number of counties	Principal county	Lower zip code	Upper zip code
Yell Township	1	Benton County		
York Township	1	Lonoke County		
