= Bibliography of American Civil War Union military unit histories =

The following list is a Bibliography of American Civil War Union military unit histories. More details on each book are available at WorldCat.

For an overall national view see Bibliography of the American Civil War. For histories of the Confederacy see Bibliography of American Civil War Confederate military unit histories.

For a guide to the bibliography see:

- Eicher, David J. The Civil War in Books An Analytical Bibliography (1997), an annotated guide to 1100 titles
- Murdock, Eugene C. Civil War in the North: A Selected, Annotated Bibliography (Garland, 1987), 765pp
- Woodworth, Steven E.; ed. The American Civil War: A Handbook of Literature and Research. Greenwood Press, 1996.

== Union military units ==
- Boyle, Frank A. A Party of Mad Fellows: The Story of the Irish Regiments in the Army of the Potomac. Dayton, Ohio: Morningside House, 1996.
- Burton, William L. Melting Pot Soldiers: The Union's Ethnic Regiments. Ames, Iowa: State University Press, 1988.
- Embick, Milton A. History of the Third Division, Ninth Corps Army of the Potomac. Harrisburg, Pennsylvania: C.E. Aughinbaugh, 1913.
- Hearn, Chester. Ellet's Brigade: The Strangest Outfit of All. 2000.
- Lause, Mark A. Race and Radicalism in the Union Army. Urbana, Illinois: University of Illinois Press, 2009.
- Starr, Stephen Z. The Union Cavalry in the Civil War, three volumes. 1979, 1981.
- Stephenson, Darl L. Headquarters in the Brush: Blazer's Independent Union Scouts. Athens, Ohio: Ohio University Press, 2001.
- Stevens, C.A. Berdan's United States Sharpshooters in the Army of the Potomac, 1861–1865. Dayton Ohio: Morningside Bookshop, 1972.
- Sullivan, David M. The United States Marine Corps in the Civil War: The First Year. Shippensburg, Pennsylvania: White Mane Publishing Company, Inc., 1997. ISBN 1-57249-040-3.
- Sullivan, David M. The United States Marine Corps in the Civil War: The Second Year. Shippensburg, Pennsylvania: White Mane Publishing Company, Inc, 1997. ISBN 1-57249-055-1.
- Sullivan, David M. The United States Marine Corps in the Civil War: The Third Year. Shippensburg, Pennsylvania: White Mane Publishing Company, Inc., 1998. ISBN 1-57249-081-0.
- Sullivan, David M. The United States Marine Corps in the Civil War: The Final Year. Shippensburg, Pennsylvania: White Mane Books, 2000. ISBN 1-57249-214-7.
- Vernon, George Washington Fayette and Thomas Hudson McKee. Civil War Regiments from Delaware, Maryland, and West Virginia, 1861–1865. eBooksOnDisk.com, 2006.

=== Union brigades ===
- Banes, Charles. History of the Philadelphia Brigade: Sixty-Ninth, Seventy-First, Seventy-Second, and One Hundred and Sixth Pennsylvania Volunteers. Philadelphia, Pennsylvania: J.B. Lippincott, 1876.
- Bilby, Joseph G. The Irish Brigade in the Civil War: The 69th New York and Other Irish Regiments of the Army of the Potomac. Cambridge, MA: Da Capo Press, 1995, 1997. ISBN 978-0-938289-97-5.
- Bitter, Rand K. Minty and his Cavalry: A History of the Saber Brigade and its Commander. published by the author, 2006.
- Britton, Wiley. The Union Indian Brigade in the Civil War. Kansas City, Missouri: Franklin Hudson Publishing Company, 1922.
- Conyngham, D.P. The Irish Brigade and Its Campaigns. New York: Fordham University Press, 1994.
- Gottfried, Bradley M. Stopping Pickett: The History of the Philadelphia Brigade. Shippensburg, Pennsylvania: White Mane Books, 1999.
- Katcher, Philip, ed. Building the Victory: The Order Book of the Volunteer Engineer Brigade, Army of the Potomac, October 1863-May 1865. Shippensburg, Pennsylvania: White Man, 1998.
- McLean, Jr., James L. Cutler's Brigade at Gettysburg. Baltimore, Maryland: Butternut & Blue, 1994.

==== Western Iron Brigade ====
- Gaff, Alan D. Brave Men's Tears: The Iron Brigade at Brawner Farm. Dayton Ohio: Morningside House, 1991.
- Gaff, Alan D. On Many a Bloody Field: Four Years in the Iron Brigade. Bloomington, Indiana: Indiana University Press, 1996.
- Herdegen, Lance J. The Iron Brigade in Civil War and Memory: The Black Hats from Bull Run to Appomattox and Thereafter. Savas Beatie, LLC, 2012. ISBN 978-1-61121-106-1.
- Herdegen, Lance J. Those Damned Black Hats!: The Iron Brigade in the Gettysburg Campaign. Savas Beatie, 2010.
- Herdegen, Lance J. The Men Stood Like Iron: How the Iron Brigade Won Its Name. Bloomington, Indiana: Indiana University Press, 1997.
- Nolan, Alan T. The Iron Brigade, A Military History. Bloomington: Indiana University Press, 1961. ISBN 0-253-34102-7.
- Nolan, Alan T. and Sharon Eggleston Vipond, editors. Giants in Their Tall Black Hats: Essays on the Iron Brigade. Bloomington, Indiana: Indiana University Press, 1998.
- Wert, Jeffry D. A Brotherhood of Valor: The Common Soldiers of the Stonewall Brigade, C.S.A., and the Iron Brigade, U.S.A. New York: Simon & Schuster, 1999. ISBN 0-684-82435-3.

=== United States field armies ===
- Hunt, Aurora. The Army of the Pacific: Its Operations in California, Texas, Arizona, New Mexico, Utah, Nevada, Oregon, Washington, Plains Region, Mexico, Etc., 1860–1866. Mechanicsburg, Pennsylvania: Stackpole Books, 2004. ISBN 0-8117-2978-8.
- Longacre, Edward G. Army of Amateurs: General Benjamin F. Butler and the Army of the James, 1863–1865. Mechanicsburg, Pennsylvania: Stackpole Books, 1997.
- Prokopowicz, Gerald J. All for the Regiment: The Army of the Ohio, 1861–1862. Chapel Hill, North Carolina: University of North Carolina Press, 2001. ISBN 0-8078-2626-X.
- Woodworth, Steven E. Nothing but Victory: The Army of the Tennessee 1861–1865. New York: Vintage Books, 2005. ISBN 978-0-375-72660-6.

==== Army of the Cumberland ====
- Cist, Henry M. The Army of the Cumberland. Charles Scribner's Sons, 1881.
- Daniel, Larry J. Days of Glory: The Army of the Cumberland, 1861–1865. Baton Rouge, Louisiana: Louisiana State University Press, 2004.
- Dodge, William Sumner. History of the Old Second Division Army of the Cumberland. Chicago, Illinois: Church & Goodman, 1864.
- Van Horne, Thomas B. History of the Army of the Cumberland two volumes. Cincinnati, Ohio: Robert Clarke & Co., 1875.

==== Army of the Potomac ====
- Beatie, Russel H. The Army of the Potomac, Volume 1: Birth of Command, November 1860 – September 1861. Cambridge, Massachusetts: Da Capo Press, 2002.
- Beatie, Russel H. Army of the Potomac, Volume 2: McClellan Takes Command, September 1861 – February 1862. Cambridge, Massachusetts: Da Capo, 2004.
- Beatie, Russel H. Army of the Potomac, Vol. 3: McClellan's First Campaign, March - May 1862. Savas Beatie, 2007. ISBN 978-1-932714-25-8.
- Catton, Bruce. The Army of the Potomac. 3 volumes. Garden City, NY: Doubleday and Company, 1951–1953. OCLC 8423035.
1. Catton, Bruce. The Army of the Potomac: Glory Road. Garden City, NY: Doubleday and Company, 1952. ISBN 0-385-04167-5.
2. Catton, Bruce. The Army of the Potomac: Mr. Lincoln's Army. Garden City, NY: Doubleday and Company, 1951. ISBN 0-385-04310-4.
3. Catton, Bruce. The Army of the Potomac: A Stillness at Appomattox. Garden City, NY: Doubleday and Company, 1953. ISBN 0-385-04451-8.
- Collins, Darrell L. The Army of the Potomac: Order of Battle, 1861–1865, with Commanders, Strengths, Losses and More. Jefferson, North Carolina: McFarland & Company, Inc., 2013. ISBN 978-0-7864-7346-5.
- Conner, Albert Z., and Chris Mackowski. Seizing Destiny: The Army of the Potomac's "Valley Forge" and the Civil War Winter that Saved the Union. El Dorado Hills, California: Savas Beatie, 2016. ISBN 978-1-61121-156-6.
- French, Samuel Livington. The Army of the Potomac from 1861 to 1863. New York: Publishing Society of New York, 1906.
- Gregg, David M. The Second Cavalry Division of the Army of the Potomac in the Gettysburg Campaign. Philadelphia, Pennsylvania: published by author, 1907.
- Joinville, Prince de. The Army of the Potomac: Its Organization, Its Commander, and Its Campaign. Translated by William H. Hurlbert. New York: Anson D.F. Randolph, 1862.
- Kreiser, Jr., Lawrence A. Defeating Lee: A History of the Second Corps, Army of the Potomac. Bloomington, Indiana: Indiana University Press, 2011.
- Naisawald, L. VanLoan. Grape and Canister: The Story of the Field Artillery of the Army of the Potomac, 1861–1865. Mechanicsburg, Pennsylvania: Stackpole, 1999.
- Stine, J.H. History of the Army of the Potomac. Washington, D.C.: Gibson Brothers, 1893.
- Swinton, William. Campaigns of the Army of the Potomac. New York: Charles B. Richardson, 1866.
- Walker, Francis Amasa. History of the Second Army Corps in the Army of the Potomac. New York: Charles Scribner's Sons, 1886.
- Wert, Jeffry D. The Sword of Lincoln: The Army of the Potomac. New York: Simon & Schuster, 2005. ISBN 0-8071-1883-4.

=== United States corps ===
- Irwin, Richard Biddle (1892). History of the Nineteenth Army Corps. New York: G. P. Putnam's Sons. OCLC 2674275.
- Kreiser, Jr., Lawrence A. Defeating Lee: A History of the Second Corps, Army of the Potomac. Bloomington, Indiana: Indiana University Press, 2011. ISBN 978-0-253-35616-1.
- Mulholland, St. Clair A. The Gettysburg Campaign: The Story of the Second Corps on the March and in Battle. Philadelphia, Pennsylvania: McLaughlin Brothers, 1880.
- Petrie, Stewart J. and George Earl Judson. Bloody Path to the Shenandoah: Fighting with the Union VI Corps in the American Civil War. Shippensburg, Pennsylvania: Burd Street Press, 2004. ISBN 9781572493575.
- Powell, William H. The Fifth Army Corps (Army of the Potomac): A Record of Operations during the Civil War in the United States of America, 1861-1865. New York: G.P. Putnam's Sons, 1896.
- Walker, Francis Amasa. History of the Second Army Corps in the Army of the Potomac. New York: Charles Scribner's Sons, 1886.
- Woodbury, Augustus. Major General Ambrose Burnside and the Ninth Army Corps: A Narrative of Campaigns in North Carolina, Maryland, Virginia, Ohio, Kentucky, Mississippi, and Tennessee, during the War for the Preservation of the Republic. Providence, Rhode Island: S.S. Rider and Brother, 1867.

== Unit histories by state ==
=== Alabama units ===
- Hoole, William Stanley. Alabama Tories: The First Alabama Cavalry, U.S.A., 1862–1865. Tuscaloosa, Alabama: Confederate Publishing Company, 1960.

=== California units ===
- Masich, Andrew Edward. The Civil War in Arizona: The Story of the California Volunteers, 1861–1865. Norman, Oklahoma: University of Oklahoma Press, 2006.
- Parson, Thomas E. Bear Flag and Bay State in the Civil War: The Californians of the Second Massachusetts Cavalry. Jefferson, North Carolina: McFarland, 2001.
- Pettis, George Henry. Frontier Service during the Rebellion; or, A History of Company K, 1st Infantry, California Volunteers. Providence, Rhode Island: Rhode Island Soldiers and Sailors Historical Society, 1885.

=== Colorado units ===
- no author listed. The March of the First: Being a History of the Organization, Marches, Battles and Services of the First Regiment, of Colorado Volunteers, the Names of the Members of the Regiment, a List of Officers and Promotions, with a Full List of Killed Dead and Wounded by a Private of the Regiment. Denver, Colorado Territory: Thomas Gibson, 1863.
- Hollister, Ovando J. History of the First Regiment of Colorado Volunteers. Denver, Colorado Territory: Thomas Gibson, 1863.
- Williams, Ellen. Three Years and a Half in the Army: History of the Second Colorados. New York: Fowler & Wells, 1885.

=== Connecticut units ===
- no author listed. 17th Connecticut Volunteers at Gettysburg, June 30th and July 1st, 2nd, and 3rd, 1863. Bridgeport, Connecticut: The Standard Association, 1884.
- Beecher, Herbert W. History of the First Light Battery, Connecticut Volunteers, 1861–1865; Personal Records and Reminiscences; The Story of the Battery from its Organization to the Present Time; Compiled from Official Records, Personal Interviews, Private Diaries, War Histories, and Individual Experiences. New York: A.T. DeLaMare Printing and Publishing Company, 1901
- Blakeslee, Bernard F. History of the Sixteenth Connecticut Volunteers. Hartford, Connecticut: Case, Lockwood, and Brainard, 1875.
- Hamblen, Charles P. Connecticut Yankees at Gettysburg. Kent, Ohio: Kent State University Press, 1993.
- Hubbell, W.S., A.M. Crane, and D.D. Brown. The Story of the Twenty First Regiment, Connecticut Volunteer Infantry during the Civil War, 1861–1865. Middletown, Connecticut: The Stewart Printing Company, 1900.
- Marvin, Edwin E. The Fifth Regiment Connecticut Volunteers. Hartford, Connecticut: Wiley, Waterman and Eaton, 1889.
- Murray, Thomas Hamilton. History of the Ninth Regiment Connecticut Volunteer Infantry, 'The Irish Regiment,' in the War of the Rebellion, 1861–1865. New Haven, Connecticut: The Price, Lee & Adkins Co., 1903.
- Page, Charles D. History of the Fourteenth Regiment, Connecticut Vol. Infantry. Meriden, Connecticut: Horton Printing Co., 1906.
- Sprague, Homer B. History of the 13th Infantry Regiment of Connecticut Volunteers During the Great Rebellion. Hartford, Connecticut: Lockwood & Co., 1867.
- Storrs, John W. The "Twentieth Connecticut": A Regimental History. Ansonia, Connecticut: Press of the Naugatuck Valley Sentinel, 1886.
- Taylor, John C. and Samuel P. Hatfield. History of the First Connecticut Artillery and the Siege Train of the Armies Operating against Richmond, 1862–1865. Hartford, Connecticut: Case, Lockwood & Brainard Company, 1893.
- Vaill, Theodore T. The County Regiment: A Sketch of the Second Regiment of Connecticut Volunteer Heavy Artillery. Winsted, Connecticut: Litchfield County University Club, 1908.
- Walker, William C. History of the 18th Regiment Connecticut Volunteers in the War for the Union. Norwich, Connecticut: no publisher given, 1885.
- Walkley, Stephen. History of the Seventh Connecticut Volunteer Infantry, 1861–1865. No publisher, 1905.

=== Delaware units ===
- Murphey, Thomas G. Four Years in the War: The History of the First Regiment of Delaware Veteran Volunteers (Infantry), From Its Organization in 1861, to the Close of the War in 1865. Philadelphia, Pennsylvania: J.S. Claxton, 1866.
- Seville, William P. History of the First Regiment Delaware Volunteers, from the Commencement of the "Three Months' Service" to the Final Muster-Out at the Close of the Rebellion. Wilmington, Delaware: Historical Society of Delaware, 1884.
- Smith, Robert G. A Brief Account of the Services Rendered by the Second Regiment Delaware Volunteers in the War of the Rebellion. Wilmington, Delaware: Historical Society of Delaware, 1909.

=== District of Columbia units ===
- Merrill, Samuel H. The Campaigns of the First Maine and First District of Columbia Cavalry. Portland, Maine: 1866.

=== Illinois units ===
- (no author listed) The Story of the Fifty–Fifth Regiment Illinois Volunteer Infantry in the Civil War, 1861–1865. Clinton, Massachusetts: W.J. Coulter, 1887.
- (no author listed) A History of the Seventy–Third Regiment of Illinois Infantry Volunteers. No place listed: Regimental Reunion Association, 1890.
- (Anonymous) Ninety-Second Illinois Volunteers. Freeport, Illinois: Journal Steam Publishing House and Bookbindery, 1875.
- (Anonymous) A History of the Seventy-third Illinois Infantry Volunteers. Springfield, Illinois: 1890.
- Ambrose, D. Leib. History of the Seventh Regiment Illinois Volunteer Infantry. Springfield, Illinois: Illinois Journal Company, 1868.
- Aten, Henry J. History of the Eighty-fifth Regiment, Illinois Volunteer Infantry. Hiawatha, Kansas: publisher by the author, 1901.
- Avery, P.O. History of the Fourth Illinois Cavalry Regiment. Humbroldt, Illinois: Enterprise, 1903.
- Barker, Lorenzo A. Military History (Michigan Boys) Company D, 66th Illinois. Reed City, Michigan: no publisher listed, 1905.
- Behlendorf, Frederick. The History of the Thirteenth Illinois Cavalry Regiment, Volunteers U.S. Army, From September, 1861 to September, 1865. Grand Rapids, Michigan: 1888.
- Bennett, L.G. and William M. Haigh. History of the 36th Illinois Volunteers during the War of the Rebellion. Aurora, Illinois: Knickerbocker & Hodder Printers, 1876.
- Bentley, William H. History of the 77th Illinois Volunteer Infantry: Sept. 2, 1862~July 10, 1865. E. Hine, printer, 1883.
- Beverly, James M. A History of the Ninety–first Regiment, Illinois Volunteer Infantry, 1862–1865. White Hall, Illinois: Pearce Printing, 1913.
- Blackwell, Jr., Samuel. In the First Line of Battle: The 12th Illinois Cavalry in the Civil War. DeKalb, Illinois: Northern Illinois University Press, 2002.
- Brown, Thaddeus S.C., Samuel J. Murphy, and William G. Putney. Behind the Guns: The History of Battery I, 2nd Regiment, Illinois Light Artillery. Carbondale, Illinois: Southern Illinois University Press, 1965.
- Bryner, Cloyd. Bugle Echoes: The Story of Illinois 47th. Springfield, Illinois: 1905.
- Cahnovsky, Tony, and D. Franklin Reister. For Those Who Still Hear the Guns: History of the 22nd Regiment Illinois Volunteer Infantry. no publisher listed, 1989.
- Calkins, W.W. The History of the 104th Regt. of Ill. Volunteer Infantry. Chicago, Illinois: Donohue & Henneberry Printers, 1895.
- Clark, C.M. History of the 29th Illinois Regiment. Chicago, Illinois: 1889.
- Cluett, William W. History of the Fifty seventh Regiment Illinois Volunteer Infantry. Princeton, Illinois: 1886.
- Davenport, Edward A> History of the Ninth Regiment Illinois Cavalry Volunteers. Chicago, Illinois: Donohue & Henneberry, 1888.
- Dodge, William Sumner. A Waif of the War; of, The History of the Seventy-fifth Illinois Infantry. Chicago, Illinois: Church & Goodman, 1866.
- Evans, Paul L. 96th Volunteer Infantry: Jo Daviess and Lake Counties. Baton Rouge, Louisiana: Land and Land, Printers, 1999.
- Fleharty, S.F. Our Regiment: A History of the 102d Ill. Inf. Vols. Chicago, Illinois: Brewster & Hanscom Printers, 1865.
- Fletcher, Samuel F. The History of Company A, Second Illinois Cavalry. Chicago, Illinois: no publisher listed, 1912.
- Gerling, Edwin G. The One Hundred Seventeenth Illinois Infantry Volunteers: (the McKendree Regiment) 1862–1865. E.G. Gerling, 1992.
- Girardi, Robert I., editor, "Campaigning with Uncle Billy," The Civil War Memoirs of Lyman S. Widney, 34th Illinois Volunteer Infantry, Victoria, B.C., Trafford Publishing, 2008. ISBN 978-1425178871
- Grunert, William. History of the One Hundred and Twenty-ninth Regiment Illinois Volunteer Infantry. Winchester, Illinois: R.B. Dedman, 1866.
- Hard, Abner. History of the Eighth Cavalry Regiment Illinois Volunteers During the Great Rebellion. Aurora, Illinois: no publisher listed, 1868.
- Hart, Ephraim J. History of the Fortieth Illinois Infantry. Cincinnati, Ohio: H.S. Bosworth, 1864.
- Haynie, J. Henry. The Nineteenth Illinois: A Memoir of a Regiment of Volunteer Infantry Famous in the Civil War of Fifty Years Ago for its Drill, Bravery, and Distinguished Services. M.A. Donahue, 1912.
- Jones, Thomas. Complete History of the 46th Regiment, Illinois Volunteer Infantry. Freeport: W.H. Wagner and Sons, 1907.
- Kimbell, Charles Bell. History of Battery "A" First Illinois Light Artillery Volunteers. Chicago, Illinois: Cushing Printing Company, 1899.
- Miller, Edward A., Jr. The Black Civil War Soldiers of Illinois: The Story of the Twenty-ninth U.S. Colored Infantry. Columbia: University of South Carolina Press, 1998.
- Morris, William S. History of the 31st Regiment Illinois Volunteers, Organized by John A. Logan. Evansville, Indiana: Keller Printing & Publishing Co., 1902.
- Morrison, Marion. A History of the Ninth Regiment Illinois Volunteer Infantry. Monmouth: John S. Clark, 1864.
- Mullins, Michael A. The Fremont Rifles: A History of the 37th Illinois Veteran Volunteer Infantry. Wilmington, North Carolina: Broadfoot, 1990.
- Newlin, W.H., comp. A History of the Seventy-third Regiment of Illinois Volunteer Infantry. Springfield, Illinois: no publisher listed, 1890.
- Partridge, Charles A. History of the Ninety-sixth Regiment Ill. Vol. Inf. Chicago, Illinois: Brown, Pettibone Co., 1887.
- Payne, Edwin Waters. History of the Thirty-fourth Regiment of Illinois Volunteer Infantry. Clinton: Allen Printing Company, 1903.
- Rogers, Robert M. The 125th Regiment Illinois Volunteer Infantry. Champaign, Illinois: Gazette Steam Print, 1882.
- Royse, Isaac Henry Clay. History of the One Hundred and Fifteenth Illinois Volunteer Infantry. Terre Haute, Indiana: 1900.
- Sanford, Washington L. History of Fourteenth Illinois Cavalry and the Brigades to Which It Belonged. Chicago, Illinois: R.R. Connelley and Sons, 1898.
- Simmons, Louis A. The History of the 84th Reg't Ill. Vols. Hampton Brothers, Publishers, 1866.
- Thompson, B.F. History of the One Hundred and Twelfth Illinois Volunteer Infantry in the Great War of the Rebellion. Toulon, Illinois: Stark County News 1885.
- Wall, David Edward. Always in the Middle of the Battle: Edward Kiniry and the 1st Illinois Light Artillery Battery D. Xlibris Corporation, 2010. ISBN 978-1-4535-4526-3.
- Walton, Clyde D., ed. Behind the Guns: A History of Battery I, 2nd Regiment, Illinois Light Artillery. Carbondale: Southern Illinois Press, 1965.
- Williams, Richard Brady. Chicago's Battery Boys: The Chicago Mercantile Battery in the Civil War's Western Theater. Savas Beatie, LLC, 2005. ISBN 978-1-932714-06-7.

=== Indiana units ===
- Anonymous. The Rear Guard of Company H: 39th Regiment of Indiana Volunteers Infantry and 8th Veteran Cavalry. no publisher listed, no date.
- Barnes, James A., James R. Carnahan, and Thomas H.B. McCain. The Eighty–sixth Regiment Indiana Volunteer Infantry: A Narrative of Its Services in the Civil War of 1861–1865. Crawfordsville, Indiana: Journal Co. Printers, 1895.
- Baxter, Nancy Niblack. Gallant Fourteenth: The Story of an Indiana Civil War Regiment. Traverse City, Indiana: Pioneer Study Center Press, 1980.
- Benefiel, W.H.H. Souvenir of the Seventeenth Indiana Regiment: A History from its Organization to the End of the War, Giving a Description of Battles, etc. Also, List of the survivors, their Names; Ages; Company, and P.O. Address. And Interesting Letters from Comrades who were not present at the Regimental Reunions. Elwood, Indiana: Model Printing and Litho Co., 1913.
- Bigelow, James K. Abridged History of the Eighth Indiana Volunteer Infantry. Indianapolis, Indiana, 1864.
- Briant, C.C. History of the Sixth Regiment Indiana Volunteer Infantry. Indianapolis, Indiana: Wm. B. Burford, Printer and Binder, 1891.
- Brown, Edmund R. The Twenty-Seventh Indiana Volunteer Infantry in the War of the Rebellion. Monticello, Indiana: 1899.
- Cogley, Thomas S. History of the Seventh Indiana Cavalry Volunteers. Laporte, Indiana: Herald Company Steam Printers, 1876.
- Comstock, Daniel W. Ninth Cavalry: One Hundred and Twenty–First Indiana Volunteers. Richmond, Indiana: J.M. Coe, 1890.
- Doll, William H. History of the Sixth Regiment Indiana Volunteer Infantry in the Civil War. Columbus, Indiana: Republican Print Job, 1903.
- Dunn, Craig L. Harvestfields of Death: The Twentieth Indiana Volunteers of Gettysburg. Carmel, Indiana: Guild Press, 1999.
- Dunn, Craig L. Iron Men, Iron Will: The Nineteenth Indiana Regiment of the Iron Brigade. Indianapolis, Indiana: Guild Press of Indiana: 1995.
- Faller, Phillip E. The Indiana Jackass Regiment in the Civil War: A History of the 21st Infantry / 1st Heavy Artillery Regiment, with a Roster. Jefferson, North Carolina: McFarland & Company, Inc., 2013. ISBN 978-0-7864-7046-4.
- Floyd, David Bittle. History of the Seventy-First Regiment of Indiana Infantry Volunteers, in Organization, Campaigns, and Battles, 1862-1865. Lutheran Publication Society, 1893.
- Floyd, David Bittle. History of the Seventy-Fifth Regiment of Indiana Infantry Volunteers, Its Organization, Campaigns, and Battles, 1862–1865. Philadelphia, Pennsylvania: Luthern Publication Society, 1893.
- Funk, Arville L. A Hoosier Regiment in Dixie: A History of the Thirty–Eighth Indiana Volunteer Infantry Regiment. Chicago, Illinois: Adams Press, 1978.
- Grose, William. The Story of the Marches, Battles, and Incidents of the 36th Regiment Indiana Volunteer Infantry. The Courier Company Press, 1891.
- Hart, Thomas. History of the Fifty-first Indiana Veteran Volunteer Infantry. Cincinnati, Ohio: The Robert Clack Company, 1894.
- High, Edwin W. History of the Sixty-Eighth Regiment Indiana Volunteer Infantry, 1862-1865, with a Sketch of E.A. King's Brigade, Reynold's Division, Thomas' Corps, in the Battle of Chickamauga. no publisher listed, 1902.
- Hight, John J. and Gilbert R. Stormont. History of the Fifty–Eight Regiment of Indiana Volunteer Infantry. Its Organization, Campaigns and Battles from 1861 to 1865. Princeton, Indiana: Clarion, 1895.
- Hubert, Charles F. History of the Fiftieth 79th Regt. Indiana Volunteer Infantry. Indianapolis, Indiana: no publisher listed, 1891.
- Hunter, Alfred G. History of the Eighty-Second Indiana Volunteer Infantry, its Organization, Campaigns and Battles. Wm. B. Burford, Printer and Binder, 1893.
- Johnson, Amasa. The Ninth Indiana Regiment at Chickamauga: An Address Given August 25th, 1887, during the Fifth Annual Reunion of the Ninth Indiana Veteran's Association. Watseka Republican Book Print, 1888.
- Jones, Jr., Wilbur D. Giants in the Cornfield: The 27th Indiana Infantry. Shippensburg, Pennsylvania: White Mane, 1997.
- Kerwood, Asbury L. Annals of the Fifty-seventh Regiment Indiana Volunteers. Dayton, Ohio: W.J. Shuely, 1868.
- Lowes, James H.S. Unwritten History of the 7th Indiana Cavalry in the War of the Rebellion. Baltimore, Maryland: Press of John Cox's Sons, 1899.
- Magee, Benjamin F. History of the 72nd Indiana Volunteer Infantry of the Mounted Lightning Brigade. Lafayette, Indiana: S. Vater & Co., 1882.
- Magee, Samuel. The Seventieth Indiana Infantry. Indianapolis, Indiana: Bowen-Merrill Co., 1900.
- McBride, John Randolph. History of the Thirty–Third Indiana Veteran Volunteer Infantry during the Four Years of Civil War, from September 16, 1861 to July 21, 1865. Indianapolis, Indiana: William R. Burford, 1900.
- Merrill, Samuel. The Seventieth Indiana Volunteer Infantry. Indianapolis, Indiana: Bowen-Merrill Co., 1900.
- Morgan, O.H. and E.R. Murphy. History of the 7th Independent Battery Indiana Light Artillery. Bedford, Indiana: no publisher listed, 1895.
- Morris, History of the Eighty-First Regiment of Indiana Volunteer Infantry in the Great War of the Rebellion 1861 to 1865. Franklin Printing House, 1901.
- Overmyer, Jack K. A Stupendous Effort: The 87th Indiana in the War of the Rebellion. Bloomington, Indiana: Indiana University Press, 1997.
- Parker, George W. History of the Seventy-Ninth Regiment Indiana Volunteers Infantry in the Civil War of Eighteen Sixty-One in the United States. The Hollenbeck Press, 1899.
- Perry, Henry Fales. History of the Thirty-Eighth Regiment Indiana Volunteer Infantry: One of the Three Hundred Fighting Regiments of the Union Army. F.A. Stuart, Printer, 1906.
- Pickerill, W.N. History of the Third Indiana Cavalry. Indianapolis, Indiana: Aetna Printing Co., 1906.
- Puntenney, George H. History of the Thirty-seventh Regiment of Indiana Infantry Volunteers: Its Organization, Campaigns, and Battles - Sept., '61 - Oct., '64. Rushville, Indiana: Jacksonian Book & Job Department, 1896.
- Renick, John H. The 44th Indiana Volunteer Infantry. LaGrange, Indiana: published by author, 1880.
- Rowell, John W. Yankee Artillerymen: Through the Civil War with Eli Lilly's Indiana Battery. Knoxville, Tennessee: University of Tennessee Press, 1975.
- Scott, Reuben A. The History of the 67th Regiment, Indiana Infantry Volunteers. Bedford Indiana: Herald Book and Job Print, 1892.
- Weaver, T.C. Third Indiana Cavalry: A Brief Account of the Actions In Which They Took Part. Greenwood, Indiana: published by author, 1919.
- Weiss, Enoch. The Forty-eighth Regiment Indiana Veteran Volunteer Infantry in the Civil War. No publisher, no date.
- Williamson, David. The Forty–Seventh Indiana Volunteer Infantry: A Civil War History. Jefferson, North Carolina: McFarland, 2011. ISBN 978-0-7864-6595-8.

=== Iowa units ===
- Barnes, Joseph D. What I Saw You Do: A Brief History of the Battles, Marches, and Sieges of the Twentieth Iowa Volunteer Infantry. Port Bryan, Illinois: Owen and Hall, 1896.
- Barnett, Simeon. A History of the Twenty–second Regiment, Iowa Volunteer Infantry. Iowa City, Iowa: N.H. Brainerd, 1865.
- Belknap, William W. History of the 15th Regiment Iowa Veteran Volunteer Infantry From October 1861 to August 1885. Keokuk: R.B. Ogden and Son, 1887.
- Bell, John T. Tramps and Triumphs of the Second Iowa Infantry, Briefly Sketched. Omaha, Nebraska: 1886.
- Blake, Ephraim E. A Succinct History of the 28th Iowa Volunteer Infantry. Belle Plain, Iowa: Union Press, 1896.
- Cook, Theodore M. Boots and Saddle: Third Iowa Cavalry, 1861–1865. No publisher listed, 1974.
- Cook, Theo M. Immortal Blue: Co. H, 19th Iowa Volunteer Infantry, 1862–1865. Bonaparte, Iowa: Record-Republican, 1966.
- Crooke, George. The Twenty–first Regiment of Iowa Volunteer Infantry. Milwaukee, Wisconsin: King, Fowle, 1891.
- Dungan, J. Irvine. History of the Nineteenth Regiment Iowa Volunteer Infantry. Davenport, Iowa: Luse and Griggs, 1865.
- Jones, Samuel C. Reminiscences of the Twenty–Second Iowa Volunteer Infantry. Iowa City, Iowa: no publisher listed, 1907.
- Lothrop, Charles H. A History of the First Regiment Iowa Cavalry Veteran Volunteers. Lyons, Iowa: Beers and Eaton, 1890.
- Mead, Homer. The Eighth Iowa Cavalry in the Civil War. Carthage, Iowa: S.C. Davidson, 1925.
- McElroy, Edith. The Undying Procession: Iowa's Civil War Regiments. Des Moines, Iowa: The Iowa Civil Centennial Commission, no date.
- McKenna, Thomas P. From Vicksburg to Cedar Creek: The 22nd Iowa Volunteer Infantry in the Civil War. Camp Pope Publishing, 2014. ISBN 978-1929919-55-0.
- Pierce, Lyman B. History of the Second Iowa Cavalry. Burlington, Iowa: Hawk-Eye Printing Establishment, 1865.
- Pryce, Samuel D. Vanishing Footsteps: The Twenty–Second Iowa Volunteer Infantry in the Civil War, edited by Jeffry C. Burden. Iowa City, Iowa: Camp Pope Bookshop, 2008.
- Reed, Daird W. Campaigns and Battles of the Twelfth Regiment Iowa Veteran Volunteer Infantry, from Organization, September 1861, to Muster-Out, January 20, 1866. Salem, Massachusetts: Higgenson Book Company, 1903.
- Scott, William F. The Story of a Cavalry Regiment: The Career of the Fourth Iowa Veteran Volunteers, From Kansas to Georgia 1861-1865. New York: G.P. Putnam's Sons, 1893.
- Smith, H.I. History of the Seventh Iowa Veteran Volunteer Infantry during the Civil War. Mason City, Iowa: E. Hitchcock, 1903.
- Sperry, Andrew F. History of the 33rd Iowa Infantry Volunteer Regiment, 1863–1866, edited by Gregory J.W. Urwin and Cathy Kunzinger. Fayetteville, Arkansas: University of Arkansas Press, 1999.
- Stuart, Addison (1865). Iowa Colonels and Regiments. Des Moines: Mills & Company. OCLC 5216797.
- Thompson, Seymour Dwight. Recollections of the Third Iowa Regiment. Cincinnati, Ohio: no publisher listed, 1864.
- Reed, David. Campaigns of the Twelfth Regiment Iowa Veteran Volunteer Infantry. Evanston, Illinois: 1903.
- Rood, H.H. History of Company A., Thirteenth Iowa Veteran Infantry. Cedar Rapids, Iowa: 1889.
- Ware, Eugene F. The Lyon Campaign in Missouri: Being a History of the First Iowa Infantry. Topeka, Kansas: Crane, 1907.
- Wright, Henry. A History of the Sixth Iowa Infantry. Iowa City, Iowa: Torch Press, 1923.

=== Kansas units ===
- Adjutant General of the State of Kansas. Military History of the Kansas Regiments. Kansas State Printing Company, 1896.
- Adjutant General's Office. Official Military History of Kansas Regiments during the War for the Suppression of the Great Rebellion. W.S. Burke, 1870.
- Benedict, Bryce D. Jayhawkers: The Civil War Brigade of James Henry Lane. Norman, Oklahoma: University of Oklahoma Press, 2009. ISBN 978-0-8061-3999-9.
- Bird, Roy. They Deserved a Better Fate: The Second Kansas State Militia Regiment and the Price Raid, 1864. East Rockaway, New Jersey: Cummings & Hathaway Publishers, 1999. ISBN 1-57981-021-7.
- Fox, Simeon M. The Seventh Kansas Cavalry. Topeka, Kansas: 1908.
- McFarland, Bill. Keep the Flag to the Front: The Story of the Eight Kansas Volunteer Infantry. Leathers Publishing, 2008.
- Pathridge, J.C. Kansas State Militia, 1864. Kansas City: 1907.
- Starr, Stephen Z. Jennison's Jayhawkers: A Civil War Regiment and Its Commander. Baton Rouge, Louisiana: Louisiana State University Press, 1973.
- Steele, James W. The Battle of the Blue of the Second Regiment, K.S.M., October 22, 1864; The Fight; The Captivity; The Escape. Topeka, Kansas: 1895.

=== Kentucky units ===
- Belcher, Dennis W. The 10th Kentucky Volunteer Infantry in the Civil War: A History and Roster. Jefferson, North Carolina: McFarland & Company, Inc., 2009. ISBN 978-0-7864-4153-2.
- Jenkins, Kirk C. The Battle Rages Higher: The Union's Fifteenth Kentucky Infantry. Lexington, Kentucky: University Press of Kentucky, 2003. ISBN 9780813122816.
- Kelly, R.M. Thomas Speed, and Alfred Pirtle. The Union Regiments of Kentucky. Louisville, Kentucky: Courier Journal Job Print, 1897.
- Reinhart, Joseph R. A History of the 6th Kentucky Volunteer Infantry U.S. Beargrass Press, 2000.
- Tarrant, Eastham. The Wild Riders of the First Kentucky Cavalry. Lexington, Kentucky: Henry Clay Press, 1969.
- Wright, Thomas J. History of the Eight Regiment Kentucky Volunteer Infantry. St. Joseph Steam Printing Co., 1880.

=== Louisiana units ===
- Hollandsworth, Jr., James G. The Louisiana Native Guards: The Black Military Experience during the Civil War. Baton Rouge, Louisiana: Louisiana State University Press, 1995.

=== Maine units ===
- (no author listed) The Story of One Regiment: The Eleventh Maine Volunteers in the War of the Rebellion. New York: J.J. Little, 1896.
- Bicknell, George W. History of the Fifth Regiment Maine Volunteers. Portland, Maine: Hall L. Davis, 1871.
- Brady, Robert. The Story of One Regiment: The Eleventh Maine Infantry Volunteers in the War of the Rebellion. New York: J.J. Little & Company, 1896.
- Desjardin, Thomas A. Stand Fast Ye Boys from Maine: The 20th Maine and the Gettysburg Campaign. Gettysburg, Pennsylvania: Thomas Publications, 1995.
- Gould, John M. History of the First–Tenth–Twenty–Ninth Maine Regiment. Portland Maine: Stephen Berry, 1871.
- Houghton, Edwin B. The Campaigns of the Seventeenth Maine. Portland, Maine: Short and Loring, 1866.
- Houston, Henry Clarence. The Thirty-second Maine Regiment of Infantry Volunteers: An Historical Sketch. Portland, Maine: Southworth Brothers, 1903.
- Lufkin, Edwin B. History of the Thirteenth Maine. Bridgton, Maine: H.A. Shorey and Son, 1898.
- Masfield, Albert and Robert Brady, Jr. Roster and Statistical Record of Company D, of the Eleventh Regiment Maine Infantry Volunteers. New York: T. Humphrey, 1890.
- Merrill, Samuel H. The Campaigns of the First Maine and First District of Columbia Cavalry. Portland, Maine: 1866.
- Mundy, James H. Second to None: The Story of the Second Maine Volunteer Infantry. Scarborough, Maine: Harp Publications, 1992.
- Pullen, John J. A Shower of Stars: The Medal of Honor and the 27th Maine. Philadelphia, Pennsylvania: J.B. Lippincott, 1966.
- Pullen, John J. The Twentieth Maine: A Volunteer Regiment in the Civil War. Philadelphia, Pennsylvania: J.B. Lippincott, 1957.
- Shaw, Horace H. The First Main Heavy Artillery, 1861-1865: A History of Its Part and Place in the War for the Union. Portland, Maine: no publisher listed, 1903.
- Shorey, Henry A. They Story of the Maine Fifteenth. Bridgton, Maine: Press of the Bridgton News, 1890.
- Small, A.R. The Sixteenth Maine Regiment in the War of the Rebellion 1861–1865. Portland, Maine: B. Thurston & Co., 1886.
- Smith, John Day. The History of the Nineteenth Regiment of Maine Volunteer Infantry. Minneapolis, Minnesota: The Great Western Printing Company, 1909.
- Smith, Ned. The 2nd Maine Cavalry in the Civil War: A History and Roster. McFarland and Company, 2014. ISBN 978-0-7864-7968-9.
- Tobie, Edward P. History of the First Maine Cavalry, 1861–1865. Boston, Massachusetts: Press of Emory & Hughes, 1887.

=== Maryland units ===
- Camper, Charles and J.W. Kirkley. Historical Record of the First Regiment Maryland Infantry, with an Appendix Containing a Register of Officers and Enlisted Men, Biographies of Deceased Officers, Etc. Washington, D.C.: Gibson Brothers, 1871.
- Wild, Frederick W. Memoirs and History of Captain F.W. Alexander's Baltimore Battery of Light Artillery. Baltimore, Maryland: Press of the Maryland School for Boys, 1912.

=== Massachusetts units ===
- (no author listed) History of the Fifth Massachusetts Battery. Boston, Massachusetts: Luther E. Cowles, 1902.
- (no author listed) History of the Thirty–Fifth Regiment Massachusetts Volunteers, 1862–1865. Boston, Massachusetts: Mills, Knight, 1884.
- Adams, John G.B. Reminiscences of the Nineteenth Massachusetts Regiment. Boston, Massachusetts: Wright and Potter Printing, 1899.
- Anderson, John. The Fifty–Seventh Regiment of Massachusetts Volunteers in the War of the Rebellion. Boston, Massachusetts: E.B. Stillings, 1896.
- Appleton, Nathan, Henry Scott, John Murray, Thomas Chase, and George Newton. History of the Fifth Massachusetts Battery: Organized October 3, 1861; Mustered Out, June 12, 1865. Boston, Massachusetts: Luther E. Cowles, 1902.
- Baker, Levi. History of the Ninth Mass. Battery, Recruited July, 1862; Mustered in August 10, 1862; Mustered Out June 9, 1865, at the Close of the War of the Rebellion. South Framingham, Massachusetts: Lakeview Press, 1888.
- Bennett, Andrew J. The Story of the First Massachusetts Light Battery, Attached to the Sixth Army Corps. Boston, Massachusetts: Deland and Barta, 1906.
- Billings, John D. The History of the Tenth Massachusetts Battery of Light Artillery in the War of the Rebellion, 1862–1865. Boston, Massachusetts: Hall and Whiting, 1881.
- Blatt, Martin H., Thomas J. Brown, and Donald Yacovone, editors. Hope and Glory: Essays on the Legacy of the 54th Massachusetts Regiment. Amherst, Massachusetts: University of Massachusetts Press, 2001.
- Boies, Andrew J. Record of the Thirty-third Massachusetts Volunteer Infantry. From August 1862 to August 1864. Fitchburg: Sentinel Printing Company, 1880.
- Bosson, Charles P. History of the Forty–Second Regiment of Infantry, Massachusetts Volunteers, 1862, 1863, 1864. Boston, Massachusetts: Mills, Knight, 1886.
- Bowen, James L. History of the Thirty-Seventh Regiment Mass. Volunteers in the Civil War of 1861–1865. Holyoke, Massachusetts: Clark W. Bryan & Co., 1884.
- Bruce, George A. The Twentieth Regiment of Massachusetts Volunteer Infantry. Boston, Massachusetts: Houghton Mifflin, 1906.
- Burchard, Peter. One Gallant Rush: Robert Gould Shaw and His Brave Black Regiment. New York: St. Martin's, 1965.
- Burrage, Henry S. History of the Thirty–Sixth Regiment, Massachusetts Volunteers, 1861–1865. Boston, Massachusetts: Rockwell and Churchill, 1884.
- Carruth, Sumner, et al. History of the Thirty–Fifth Regiment Massachusetts Volunteers, 1862–1865, with a Roster. Boston, Massachusetts: Mills, Knight & Company, 1884.
- Cook, Benjamin F. History of the Twelfth Massachusetts Volunteers, Webster Regiment. Boston, Massachusetts: Twelfth Regiment Association.
- Cowles, Luther E., ed. History of the Fifth Massachusetts Battery. Baltimore, Maryland: Butternut & Blue, 1996.
- Crowninshield, Benjamin W. A History of the First Regiment of Massachusetts Cavalry Volunteers. Boston, Massachusetts: Houghton Mifflin & Co., 1891.
- Cudworth, Warren H. History of the First Regiment (Massachusetts Infantry). Boston, Massachusetts: Walker, Fuller, 1866.
- Cushman, Frederick E. History of the 58th Regt. Massachusetts Vols., from the 15th Day of September, 1863, to the Close of the Rebellion. Washington, D.C.: Gibson Brothers, 1865.
- Davis, Jr., Charles E. Three Years in the Army: The Story of the Thirteenth Massachusetts Volunteers From July 16, 1861 to August 1, 1864. Boston, Massachusetts: Estes & Lownat, 1864.
- Dusseault, John H. Company E, Thirty–Ninth Infantry in the civil War. Somerville, Massachusetts: Somerville Journal Print, 1908.
- Earle, David M. History of the Excursion of the Fifteenth Massachusetts Regiments and Its Friends to the Battle-fields of Gettysburg, Pa., Antietam, Md., Ball's Bluff, Virginia, and Washington, D.C., May 31 - June 12, 1886. Worcester, Massachusetts: Press of Charles Hamilton, 1886.
- Ellis, Jr., Alden C. The Massachusetts Andrew Sharpshooters: A Civil War History and Roster. Jefferson, North Carolina: McFarland & Company, Inc., 2012. ISBN 978-0-7864-6489-0.
- Emilio, Luis F. History of the Fifty-Fourth Regiment of Massachusetts Volunteer Infantry, 1863-1865. published 1894.
- Ewer, James K. The Third Massachusetts Cavalry in the War for the Union. Maplewood, Massachusetts: Historical Committee of the Regimental Association, 1903.
- Ford, Andrew E. The Story of the Fifteenth Regiment Massachusetts Volunteer Infantry in the Civil War. Clinton, Massachusetts: W.J. Coulter, 1898.
- Hutchinson, Nelson V. History of the Seventh Massachusetts Volunteer Infantry in the War of the Rebellion of the Southern States Against Constitutional Authority, 1861–1865. Taunton, Massachusetts: The Regimental Assoc., 1890.
- Lincoln, William S. Life with the 34th Massachusetts Infantry in the War of the Rebellion. Worcester, Massachusetts: Press of Noyes, Snow, and Company, 1879.
- Macnamara, Daniel G. The History of the Ninth Regiment Massachusetts Volunteer Infantry. Boston, Massachusetts: E.B. Stillings, 1899.
- McLean, James. California Sabers: The Second Massachusetts Cavalry in the Civil War. Bloomington, Indiana: Indiana University Press, 2000.
- McNamara, Daniel G. History of the Ninth Regiment Massachusetts Volunteer Infantry Second Brigade, First Division, Fifth Army Corps, Army of the Potomac June 1861–June 1864. Boston, Massachusetts: E.B. Stillings & Co., 1899.
- Miller, Richard F. Harvard's Civil War: A History of the Twentieth Massachusetts Volunteer Infantry. Hanover, New Hampshire: University Press of New England, 2005.
- Morse, Charles F. History of the Second Massachusetts Regiment of Infantry. Boston, Massachusetts: George H. Ellis, 1882.
- Osborne, William H. The History of the Twenty-Ninth Regiment of Massachusetts Volunteer Infantry. Boston, Massachusetts: Albert J. Wright, 1877.
- Parker, Francis J. The Story of the Thirty-Second Massachusetts Infantry. Boston, Massachusetts: C.W. Calkins & Co., 1880.
- Parker, John L. Henry Wilson's Regiment: History of the Twenty-second Massachusetts Infantry, the Second Company Sharpshooters, and the Third Light Battery, in the War of the Rebellion. Baltimore, Maryland: Butternut & Blue, 1998.
- Powers, George W. The Story of the Thirty Eighth Regiment of Massachusetts Volunteers. Cambridge, Massachusetts: Dakin and Metcalf, 1866.
- Roe, Alfred S. History of the First Regiment of Heavy Artillery, Massachusetts Volunteers, 1862-1865. Worcester, Massachusetts: Regimental Association, 1917.
- Roe, Alfred S. The Tenth Regiment Massachusetts Volunteer Infantry. Springfield, Massachusetts: Tenth Regiment Veteran Association, 1909.
- Roe, Alfred S. The Thirty-Ninth Regiment Massachusetts Volunteers, 1861–1865. Worcester, Massachusetts: Thirty Ninth Regiment Veteran Association, 1914.
- Roe, Alfred, Charles B. Amory, John C. Cook, and George Hill. The Twenty–Fourth Regiment Massachusetts Volunteers, 1861–1866, "New England Guard Regiment". Worcester, Massachusetts: Twenty–Fourth Regiment Veteran Association, 1907.
- Roe, Alfred Seelye and Charles Nutt. History of the First Regiment of Heavy Artillery Massachusetts Volunteers, formerly the 14th Regiment of Infantry, 1861–1865. Boston, Massachusetts: Commonwealth Printers, 1917.
- Stevens, William Burnham, Soloman Nelson, and William C. Eustis. History of the Fiftieth Regiment of Infantry, Massachusetts Volunteer Militia in the Late War of the Rebellion. Boston, Massachusetts: Griffith–Stillings, 1907.
- Waitt, Ernest Linden, compiler. History of the 19th Regiment, Massachusetts Volunteer Infantry. Salem, Massachusetts: The Salem Press, 1906.
- Walcott, Charles F. History of the Twenty-First Regiment Massachusetts Volunteers in the War for the Preservation of the Union, 1861–1865, with Statistics of the War and Rebel Prisons. Boston, Massachusetts: Houghton Mifflin, 1882.

=== Michigan units ===
- (Anonymous) Outline of the Veteran Service of the Tenth Regiment of Michigan Veteran Volunteer Infantry. no publisher listed, no date.
- Anderson, William M. They Died to Make Men Free: A History of the 19th Michigan Infantry in the Civil War. Barrien Springs, Michigan: Hardscrabble Books, 1980.
- Belknap, Charles E. History of the Michigan Organizations at Chickamauga, Chattanooga, and Missionary Ridge, 1863. Robert Smith Printing Company, 1897.
- Bennett, Charles W. Historical Sketches of the Ninth Michigan Infantry. Coldwater, Michigan: Daily Courier Print, 1913.
- Cutcheon, Byron M. The Story of the Twentieth Michigan Infantry, July 15th, 1862, to May 30th, 1865. Lansing, Michigan: Robert Smith Printing Co., 1904.
- Curtis, O.B. History of the Twenty-Fourth Michigan of the Iron Brigade, Known as the Detroit and Wayne County Regiment. Detroit, Michigan: Winn & Hammond, 1891.
- Cutcheon, Byron Mac. The Story of the Twentieth Michigan Infantry, July 15th, 1862, to May 30th, 1865, Embracing Official Documents on File in the Records of the State of Michigan and of the United States Referring or Relative to the Regiment. Lansing, Michigan: Robert Smith Printing Company, 1904.
- Genco, James G. To the Sound of Musketry and the Tap of the Drum: A History of Michigan's Battery D Through the Letters of Artificer Harold J. Bartlett 1861–1865. Detroit, Michigan: Detroit Book Press, 1990.
- Genco, James G. Into the Tornado of War: A History of the Twenty–First Michigan Infantry in the Civil War. Bloomington, Indiana: Abbott Press, 2012.
- Herek, Raymond J. These Men Have Seen Hard Service: The First Michigan Sharpshooters in the Civil War. Detroit, Michigan: Wayne State University Press, 1998.
- Hoffman, Mark. My Brave Mechanics: The First Michigan Engineers and Their Civil War. Wayne State University Press, 2007.
- Isham, Asa B. An Historical Sketch of the Seventh Regiment Michigan Volunteer Cavalry. New York: Town Topics Publishing Company, 1893.
- Lee, William O. Personal and Historical Sketches of the 7th Regiment Michigan Volunteer Cavalry. Detroit, Michigan: Ralston–Stroup Printing, 1901.
- Sligh, Charles R. History of the Services of the First Regiment Michigan Engineers and Mechanics. Grand Rapids, Michigan: White, 1921.
- Smith, Donald L. The Twenty-Fourth Michigan of the Iron Brigade. Harrisburg, Pennsylvania: The Stackpole Company, 1962.
- Soper, Steve. The”Glorious Old Third” A History of the Third Michigan Infantry 1855 to 1927. Old Third Publishing, 1988. ISBN 0-9787861-0-6.
- Stowe, Mark S. Company B. 6th Michigan Cavalry. Grand Rapids, Michigan: published by the author, 2000.
- Thatcher, Marshall P. A Hundred Battles in the West, St. Louis to Atlanta: The Second Michigan Cavalry with the Armies of Mississippi, Ohio, Kentucky and Cumberland. Detroit, Michigan: L.F> Kilroy, 1884.
- Townshend, David G. The Seventh Michigan Volunteer Infantry: The Gallant Men and Flag in the Civil War, 1861 to 1865. Fort Lauderdale, Florida: Southeast Publications, 1994.
- Trowbridge, Luther S. A Brief History of the Tenth Michigan Cavalry. Detroit, Michigan: Friesema Brothers Printing, 1905.

=== Minnesota units ===
- Bergemann, Kurt D. Brackett's Battalion Minnesota Cavalry 1861–1866. Minneapolis, Minnesota: Adeniram Publications, 1996.
- Bishop, Judson W. The Story of a Regiment, Being a Narrative of the Service of the Second Regiment, Minnesota Veteran Volunteer Infantry in the Civil War of 1861–1865. St. Paul, Minnesota: no publisher listed, 1890.
- Brown, Alonzo L. History of the Fourth Regiment of Minnesota Infantry Volunteers. St. Paul, Minnesota: 1892.
- Eggleston, Michael A. The Tenth Minnesota Volunteers, 1862–1865: A History of Action in the Sioux Uprising and the Civil War, with a Regimental Roster. Jefferson, North Carolina: McFarland & Company, Inc., 2012. ISBN 978-0-7864-6593-4.
- Holcombe, Return I. History of the First Regiment Minnesota Volunteer Infantry. Stillwater, Minnesota: Easton & Mastermann Printers, 1916.
- Imholte, John Quinn. The First Volunteers: History of the First Minnesota. Minneapolis, Minnesota: Ross and Haines, 1963.
- Wright, James H. No More Gallant A Deed: A Civil War Memoir of the First Minnesota Volunteers. edited by Steven J. Keillor. St. Paul, Minnesota: Minnesota Historical Society Press, 2001.

=== Missouri units ===
- Allendorf, Donald. The Long Road to Liberty: The Odyssey of a German Regiment in the Yankee Army, The 15th Missouri Volunteer Infantry. Kent, Ohio: Kent State University Press, 2006.
- Anders, Leslie. The Eighteenth Missouri. Indianapolis, Indiana: Bobbs–Mereill Company, 1968.
- Anders, Leslie. The Twenty-First Missouri: From Home Guard to Union Regiment. Westport, Connecticut: 1975.
- Belcher, Dennis W. The 11th Missouri Volunteer Infantry in the Civil War: A History and Roster. Jefferson, North Carolina: McFarland & Company, Inc., 2011. ISBN 978-0-7864-4882-1.
- Casto, David E. Arkansas Late in the War: The 8th Missouri Volunteer Cavalry, April 1864 - July 1865. Charleston, South Carolina: The History Press, 2013. ISBN 978-1-62619-107-5.
- Neal, William A. An Illustrated History of the Missouri Engineer and the 25th Infantry Regiments: together with a roster of both regiments and the last known address of all that could be obtained. Chicago, Illinois: Donohue and Henneberry, printers, 1889.
- Pompey, Sherman L. Keep the Home Fires Burning: A History of the Seventh Regiment Missouri State Militia Cavalry in the Civil War. Warrensburg, Missouri: Johnson County Historical Society, 1962.
- Starr, N.D., and T.W. Holman. The 21st Missouri Regiment Infantry Veteran Volunteers. Fort Madison, Iowa: Roberts & Roberts, Printers, 1899.

=== New Jersey units ===
- Baquet, Camille. History of the First Brigade, New Jersey Volunteers, from 1861 to 1865. Trenton, New Jersey: MacCrellish & Quigley, 1910.
- Bilby, Joseph. The Rousing Cheers: A History of the Fifteenth New Jersey from Flemington to Appomattox. Hightstown, New Jersey: Longstreet House, 2001.
- Campbell, Edward Livingston. Historical Sketch of the Fifteenth Regiment, New Jersey Volunteers, First Brigade, First Division, Sixth Corps. Trenton, New Jersey: W.S. Sharp, 1880.
- Gottfried, Bradley. Kearny's Own: The History of the First New Jersey Brigade in the Civil War. Piscataway, New Jersey: Rutgers University Press, 2005.
- Haines, Alanson A. History of the Fifteenth Regiment New Jersey Volunteers. New York: Jenkins & Thomas, 1883.
- Haines, William. History of the Men of Co. F, with Descriptions of the Marches and Battles of the 12th New Jersey Vols. Mickleton, New Jersey: C.S. Magrath, 1897.
- Hanifen, Michael. History of Battery B, First New Jersey Artillery. Ottawa, Illinois: Republican-Times, 1905.
- Jago, Frederick. 12th New Jersey Volunteers, 1862-1865. Pennsauken, New Jersey: Gloucester County Historical Society, 1967.
- Lee, William O., comp. Personal and Historical Sketches and Facial History of and by Members of the Seventh Regiment Michigan Volunteer Cavalry 1862–1865. Detroit, Michigan: 7th Michigan Cavalry Assoc., 1902.
- Longacre, Edward G. Custer and His Wolverines: The Michigan Cavalry Brigade, 1861–1865. Conshohocken, Pennsylvania: Combined Publishing, 1997.
- Longacre, Edward G. To Gettysburg and Beyond: The Twelfth New Jersey Volunteer Infantry, II Corps, Army of the Potomac, 1862-1865. Hightstown, New Jersey: Longstreet House, 1988.
- Longacre, Edward G. The Sharpshooters: A History of the Ninth New Jersey Volunteer Infantry in the Civil War. Potomac Books, 2017. ISBN 978-1-61234-807-0.
- Marbaker, Thomas. History of the Eleventh New Jersey Volunteers. Trenton, New Jersey: MacCrellish & Quigley, 1898.
- Pyne, Henry R. Ride to War: The History of the First New Jersey Cavalry, edited by Earl Schenck Miers. New Brunswick, New Jersey: Rutgers University Press, 1961.
- Terrill, J. Newton. Campaign of the Fourteenth Regiment New Jersey Volunteers. New Brunswick, New Jersey: Daily Homes News Press, 1884.
- Toombs, Samuel. New Jersey Troops in the Gettysburg Campaign, from June 5 to July 31, 1863. Orange, New Jersey: The Evening Hall Publishing House, 1888.

=== New Hampshire units ===
- (no author listed) History of the First N.H. Battery, during the War of the Rebellion, Together with the By Laws of Platoon A, First N.H. Light Artillery. Manchester, New Hampshire: T.H. Tuson, 1878.
- (no author listed) Names and Records of All the Members Who Served in the First N.H. Battery of Light Artillery during the Late Rebellion. Manchester, New Hampshire: Budget Job Print, 1891.
- Bartlett, Asa W. History of the Twelfth Regiment New Hampshire Volunteers in the War of the Rebellion. Concord, New Hampshire: Ira C. Evans, 1897.
- Buffum, Francis H. A Memorial of the Great Rebellion: Being a History of the Fourteenth Regiment New Hampshire Volunteers, Covering Its Three Years of Service, With Original Sketches of Army Life, 1862–1865. Boston, Massachusetts: Franklin Press: Rand, Avery & Co., 1882.
- Child, William. A History of the Fifth Regiment New Hampshire Volunteers in the American Civil War, 1861–1865. Bristol, New Hampshire: R.W. Musgrove, 1893.
- Cogswell, Leander. A History of the Eleventh New Hampshire Regiment Volunteer Infantry in the Rebellion War, 1861–1865, Covering Its Entire Service with Interesting Scenes of Army Life, and Graphic Details of Battles, Skirmishes, Sieges, Marches, and Hardships in Which Its Officers and Men Participated. Concord, New Hampshire: Republican Press Association, 1891.
- Eldredge, Daniel. The Third New Hampshire, 1861–1865. Boston, Massachusetts: Stillings & Co., 1893.
- Haynes, Martin A. History of the Second Regiment New Hampshire Volunteers. Manchester, New Hampshire: Charles W. Livington, 1865.
- Jackman, Lyman. History of the Sixth New Hampshire Regiment. Concord, New Hampshire: Republican Press Association, 1891.
- Kent, Charles N. History of the Seventeenth Regiment, New Hampshire Volunteer Infantry 1862–1863. Concord, New Hampshire: Seventeenth New Hampshire Veteran Assoc., 1989.
- Little, Henry. The 7th Regiment of New Hampshire Volunteers in the War of the Rebellion. Concord, New Hampshire: no publisher, 1886.
- Lord, Edward O. History of the Ninth New Hampshire Volunteers in the War of the Rebellion. Concord, New Hampshire: no publisher listed, 1895.1
- Marvel, William. Race of the Soil: The Ninth New Hampshire Regiment in the Civil War. Wilmington, North Carolina: Broadfoot, 1988.
- Stanyan, John M. A History of the Eighth Regiment of New Hampshire Volunteers, Including Its Service as Infantry, Second N.H. Cavalry, and Veteran Battalion in the Civil War of 1861–1865. Concord, New Hampshire: Ira C. Evans, 1892.
- Thompson, S. Millett. Thirteenth Regiment of New Hampshire Volunteer Infantry in the War of the Rebellion, 1861–1865: A Diary Covering Three Years and a Day. Boston, Massachusetts: Houghton Mifflin Company, 1888.
- Townsend, Luther Tracy. History of the Sixteenth Regiment, New Hampshire Volunteers. Washington, D.C.: Norman T. Elliott, 1897.
- Pride, Mike and Mark Travis. My Brave Boys: To War with Colonel Cross and the Fighting Fifth. Hanover, New Hampshire: University Press of New England, 2001.
- Waite, Otis F.R. New Hampshire in the Great Rebellion, Containing Histories of the Several New Hampshire Regiments and Biographical Notices of Many of the Prominent Actors in the Civil War of 1861–1865. Claremont, New Hampshire: Tracy, Chase & Company, 1870.

=== New York units ===
- (no author listed) Twenty-fifth Anniversary of the Muster into the Service of the United States of the Tenth Regiment of New York Volunteer Infantry (National Zouaves). New York: Charles H. Ludwig, 1886.
- Ames, Nelson. History of Battery G, First Regiment, New York Light Artillery. Marshalltown, Iowa: Marshall Printing Co., 1900.
- Bacarella, Michael. Lincoln's Foreign Legion: The 39th New York Infantry, The Garibaldi Guard. Shippensburg, Pennsylvania: White Mane Publishing Company, Inc., 1998.
- Barram, Rick. The 72nd New York Infantry in the Civil War: A History and Roster. McFarland and Company, 2014. ISBN 978-0-786476442.
- Beach, William H. The First New York (Lincoln) Cavalry: From April 19, 1861 to July 7, 1865. New York: The Lincoln Cavalry Association, 1902.
- Beecher, Harris H. Record of the 114th Regiment, N.Y.S.V., Where It Went, What It Saw, and What It Did. Norwich, New York: J.J. Hubbard, Jr., 1866.
- Beaudry. Historic Records of the Fifth New York Cavalry, First Ira Harris guard, Its Organization, Marches, Raids, Scouts, Engagements, and General Services During the Rebellion of 1861–1865. Albany, New York: S.R. Grey, 1865.
- Bennett, Brian A. Sons of Old Monroe: A Regimental History of Patrick O'Rorke's 140th New York Volunteer Infantry. Dayton, Ohio: Morningside House, 1999.
- Best, Isaac O. History of the 121st New York Infantry. Chicago, Illinois: Jason H. Smith, 1921.
- Bidwell, Frederick David. History of the Forty-Ninth New York Volunteers. Albany, New York: J.B. Lyon Co., 1916.
- Bonnell, Jr., John C. Sabres in the Shenandoah: The 21st New York Cavalry, 1863–1866. Shippensburg, Pennsylvania: Burd Street Press, 1996.
- Boudrye, Louis N. Historic Records of the Fifth New York Cavalry, First Ira Harris Guard. Albany, New York: J. Munsell, 1868.
- Bowen J.R. Regimental History of the First New York Dragoons During Three Years of Active Service in the Great Civil War. New York: published by the author, 1908.
- Boyce, Charles W. A Brief History of the Twenty-eighth Regiment New York State Volunteers. Buffalo, New York: 1896.
- Brainard, Mary Genevie Green. Campaigns of the 146th Regiment New York State Volunteers, Also Known as Halleck's Infantry, the Fifth Oneida, and Garrard's Tigers. New York: G.P. Putnam's Sons, 1915.
- Burns, Vincent L. The Fifth New York Cavalry in the Civil War. Jefferson, North Carolina: McFarland & Company, Inc., 2013. ISBN 978-0-7864-7690-9.
- Callenda, Frank. The 14th Brooklyn Regiment in the Civil War: A History and Roster. Jefferson, North Carolina: McFarland & Company, Inc., 2013. ISBN 978-0-7864-4899-9.
- Chapin, Louis N. A Brief History of the Thirty-Fourth Regiment N.Y.S.V. Albany, New York: no publisher listed, 1903.
- Cheney, Newel. History of the Ninth Regiment New York Volunteer Cavalry. Jamestown, New York: Poland Center, 1901.
- Cilella, Jr., Salvatore G. Upton's Regulars: The 121st New York Infantry in the Civil War. Lawrence, Kansas: University Press of Kansas, 2009. ISBN 978-0-7006-1645-9.
- Clark, Orton S. The One Hundred and Sixteenth Regiment of New York State Volunteers. Buffalo, New York: Printing House of Matthews & Warren, 1868.
- Collins, George K. Memoirs of the 149th Regt. N.Y. Vol. Inft. 3d Brig., 2d Div., 12th and 20th A.C. Hamilton, New York: Edmonston Publishing, Inc., 1995.
- Comings, H.H. Personal Reminiscences of Co. E, N.Y. Fire Zouaves Better Known as Ellsworth's Fire Zouaves. Malden, Massachusetts: J. Gould Tilden, 1886.
- Committee on Regimental History. History of the Sixth New York Cavalry (Second Ira Harris Guard). Worcester, New York: Blanchard Press, 1908.
- Cook, S.G. and Charles E. Benton, eds. The "Duchess County Regiment": (150th Regiment of New York State Volunteer Infantry) in the Civil War. Danbury, Connecticut: Danbury Medical Printing, 1907.
- Cowtan, Charles W. Services of the Tenth New York Volunteers (National Zouves) in the War of the Rebellion. New York: C.H. Ludwig, 1882.
- Cunningham, John L. Three Years with the Adirondack Regiment: 118th New York Volunteer Infantry. Norwood, Massachusetts: The Plimpton Press, 1920.
- Davenport, Alfred. Camp and Field Life of the Fifth New York Volunteer Infantry (Duryee Zouaves). New York: Dick and Fitzgerald, 1879.
- Dunkelman, Mark. Brothers One and All: Esprit de Corps in a Civil War Regiment. (154th New York Infantry). Baton Rouge, Louisiana: Louisiana State University Press, 2004.
- Dunkelman, Mark H., and Michael Winey. The Hardtack Regiment: An Illustrated History of the 154th Regiment New York State Infantry Volunteers. Rutherford, New Jersey: Farleigh Dickerson University Press, 1981.
- Fairchild, C.B. History of the 27th Regiment N.Y. Vols. Binghamton, New York: Carl & Matthews, 1888.
- Floyd, Fred C. History of the Fortieth (Mozart) Regiment New York Volunteers. Boston, Massachusetts: F.H. Gilson, 1909.
- Foster, Alonzo. Reminiscences and Records of the 6th New York V.V. Cavalry. Brooklyn, New York: published by author, 1892.
- Frederick, Gilbert. The Story of a Regiment, Being a Record of the Military Services of the Fifty–seventh New York State Volunteer Infantry in the War of the Rebellion, 1861–1865. Chicago, Illinois: C.H. Morgan Company, 1895.
- Gibbs, A. Judson, David A. King, and Jay H. Northrup. History of the Ninety Third Regiment, New York Volunteer Infantry, 1861–1865. Milwaukee, Wisconsin, Swain & Tate, 1895.
- Hall, Henry and James Hall. Cayuga in the Field: A Record of the 19th N.Y. Volunteers, all the batteries of the 3d New York Artillery, and 75th New York Volunteers, two volumes. no place listed: Truair, Smith & Co., 1873.
- Hall, Hillman and W.B. Besley. History of the Sixth New York Cavalry, Second Ira Harris Guard Second Brigade, First Division, Cavalry Corps, Army of the Potomac, 1861–1865. Worcester, New York: The Blanchard Press, 1908.
- Hall, Isaac. History of the Ninety-Seventh Regiment New York Volunteers ("Conkling Rifles") in the War for the Union. Utica, New York: Press of L.C. Childs & Son, 1890.
- Hanaburgh, David H. History of the 128th Regiment New York Volunteer. New York: Enterprise Publishing Co., 1894.
- Howell, Helena A., comp. Chronicles of the One Hundred Fifty-First Regiment New York State Volunteer Infantry, 1862–1865. Albion, New York: no publisher listed.
- Huntington, Albert. 8th New York Cavalry. Historical Papers. Palmyra, New York: 1902.
- Husk, Martin W. The 111th New York Volunteer Infantry: A Civil War History. Jefferson, North Carolina: McFarland, 2010.
- Hussey, George A. History of the Ninth Regiment, N.Y.S.M.–N.G.S.N.Y. (Eighty-Third N.Y. Volunteers). New York: Regimental Veterans Association, 1889.
- Hyde, William L. History of the 112th New York Volunteers. Freedonia, New York: McHenstry & Co., 1965.
- Judd, David W. The Story of the Thirty-third N.Y.S. Vols. Rochester, New York: Benton and Andrews, 1865.
- Keating, Robert. Carnival of Blood: The Civil War Ordeal of the Seventh New York Heavy Artillery. Baltimore, Maryland: Butternut and Blue, 1998.
- King, David. History of the Ninety-Third Regiment, New York Volunteer Infantry, 1861-1865. Milwaukee, Wisconsin: Swain and Tate, 1895.
- Kirk, Hyland Clare. Heavy Guns and Light: A History of the 4th New York Heavy Artillery. New York: C.T. Dillingham, 1890.
- LaRocca, Charles J. The 124th New York State Volunteers in the Civil War: A History and Roster. Jefferson, North Carolina: McFarland & Company, Inc., 2012. ISBN 978-0-7864-6697-9.
- Mahood, Wayne. "Written in Blood" : A History of the 126th New York Infantry in the Civil War. Hightstown, New Jersey: Longstreet House, 1997.
- Mahon, John. New York's Fighting Sixty-Ninth. Jefferson, North Carolina: McFarland & Co. Publishers, Inc., 2004.
- McKnight, William Mark. Blue Bonnets O'er the Border: The 79th New York Cameron Highlanders. Shippensburg, Pennsylvania: White Mane, 1998.
- Morhous, Henry C. Reminiscences of the 123rd Regiment, N.Y.S.V. Greenwich, New York: People's Journal, 1879.
- Morrow, Robert F. 77th New York Volunteers: "Sojering" in the VI Corps. Mechanicsburg, Pennsylvania: White Mane Books, 2004. ISBN 9781572493520.
- Mowris, J.A. A History of the One Hundred and Seventeenth Regiment, N.Y. Volunteers, (Fourth Oneida), From the Date of Its Organization, August, 1862, till That of Its Muster Out, June, 1865. Hartford, Connecticut: Case, Lockwood & Company, 1866.
- Nash, Eugene Arus. A History of the Forty-fourth Regiment New York Volunteer Infantry in the Civil War, 1861–1865. Chicago, Illinois: R.R. Donnelly & Sons, 1911.
- Norton, Chauncey S. "The Red Neck Ties": or, History of the Fifteenth New York Volunteer Cavalry. Ithaca, New York: Journal Book and Job Printing House, 1891.
- Norton, Henry. A Sketch of the 8th N.Y. Cavalry, Unwritten History of the Rebellion. published by author, 1888.
- O'Mara, Daniel A.S. Proceedings of the Associated Survivors of the Fifty-Ninth Reg't, N.Y. Vet. Vols. First Annual Re-Union and Dedication of Monument at Gettysburg, Pa., July 3d, 1889. New York: Wm. Finley, Printer, 1889.
- Osborne, Steward R. Holding the Left at Gettysburg: The 20th New York State Militia on July 1, 1863. Hightstown, New Jersey: Longstreet House, 1990.
- Pellet, Elias Porter. History of the 114th Regiment, New York State Volunteers. Norwich, New York: Telegraph & Chronicle power press print, 1866.
- Pinto, Francis E. History of the 32nd Regiment, New York Volunteers, In the Civil War, 1861 to 1863, And personal recollection during that period. Brooklyn, New York: no publisher, 1865.
- Preston, Noble D. History of the Tenth Regiment of Cavalry New York State Volunteers. New York: D. Appleton & Co., 1892.
- Reed, Thomas J. Tibbits' Boys: A History of the 21st New York Cavalry. Lanham, Maryland: University Press of America, 1997.
- Remington, Cyrus K. A Record of Battery I, First New York Rgmt Artillery. Buffalo, New York: Courier Publishing Co., 1891.
- Roback, Henry. The Veteran Volunteers of Herkimer and Otsego Counties in the War of the Rebellion. Utica, New York: Press of L.C. Childs, 1888.
- Roe, Alfredt Seyle. History of the Ninth New York Heavy Artillery. Worcester, Massachusetts: published by author, 1899.
- Rummel III, George A. 72 Days at Gettysburg: Organization of the 10th Regiment, New York Volunteer Cavalry. Shippensburg, Pennsylvania: White Mane, 1997.
- Shaw, Charles A. A History of the 14th Regiment N.Y. Heavy Artillery in the Civil War from 1863 to 1865. Mt. Kisco, New York: North Westchester Pub. Co., 1918.
- Silo, Mark. The 115th New York in the Civil War: A Regimental History. Jefferson, North Carolina: McFarland & Company, Inc., Publishers, 2007. ISBN 978-0-7864-2997-4.
- Simons, Ezra D. A Regimental History. The One Hundred and Twenty-Fifth New York State Volunteers. New York: published by author, 1888.
- Smith, Abram P. History of the Seventy-sixth Regiment, New York Volunteers. Syracuse, New York: Truair, Smith & Miles, 1867.
- Smith, Thomas West. The Story of a Cavalry Regiment: "Scott's 900", Eleventh New York Cavalry from the St. Lawrence River to the Gulf of Mexico 1861–1865. New York: Published by the Veteran Association of the Regiment, 1897.
- Stevenson, James. History of the Excelsior or Sickles' Brigade. Paterson, New Jersey: Van Derhoven and Holms, 1863.
- Stevenson, James H. Boots and Saddles: A History of the First Volunteer Cavalry of the War, Known as the First New York (Lincoln) Cavalry. Harrisburg, Pennsylvania: The Patriot Publishing Company, 1879.
- Stowits, George. History of the One Hundredth Regiment of New York State Volunteers: Being A Recollection of Its Services from Its Muster In to Its Muster Out; Its Muster In Roll, Roll of Commissions, Recruits Furnished Through the Board of Trade of the City of Buffalo, and Short Sketches of Deceased and Surviving Officers. Buffalo, New York: Matthews & Warren, 1870.
- Swinfen, David B. Ruggles' Regiment: The 122nd New York Volunteers in the American Civil War. Hanover, New Hampshire: University Press of New England, 1982.
- Tiemann, William F. The 159th Infantry New York State Volunteers in the War of the Rebellion, 1862–1865. Brooklyn, New York: William F. Tiemann, 1894.
- Todd, William, ed., History of the Ninth Regiment, N.Y.S.M., N.G.S.N.Y. (83rd New York Volunteers), 1845–1888. New York: George Hussey, 1889.
- Van Santvoord, Cornelius. The One Hundred and Twentieth Regiment New York State Volunteers: A Narrative of Its Services in the War for the Union. Rondout, New York: Press of the Kingston Freeman, 1894.
- Washburn, George H. A Complete Military History and Record of the 108th Regiment N.Y. Vols., from 1862 to 1894. Rochester, New York: E.R. Andrews, 1894.
- Weygant, Charles H. History of the One Hundred and Twenty-Fourth N.Y.S.V. Newburg, New York: Journal Printing House, 1877.
- Winey, Michael J. and Mark H. Dunkelman. The Hardtack Regiment: An Illustrated History of the 154th Regiment, New York State Infantry Volunteers. Rutherford, New Jersey: Fairleigh Dickinson Press, 1981.

=== North Carolina units ===
- Killian, Ron V. A History of the North Carolina Third Mounted Infantry Volunteers U.S.A; March 1864 to August 1865. Westminster, Maryland: Heritage Books, 2008.

=== Ohio units ===
- (no author listed) A Sketch of the Operations of the Forty–Seventh Ohio Volunteer Infantry. Cincinnati, Ohio: George P. Houston, 1885.
- Association of the Regiment. Roster of Survivors of the Twenty–Sixth Ohio Veteran Volunteer Infantry. The Office of the Ohio Soldier, 1888.
- Aston, Howard. History and Roster of the Fourth and Fifth Independent Battalions and Thirteenth Regiment Ohio Cavalry Volunteers. Columbus, Ohio: Fred J. Heer, 1902.
- Baumgartner, Richard A., ed. The Bully Boys: In Camp and Combat with the 2nd Ohio Volunteer Infantry Regiment 1861-1864. Huntington, West Virginia: Blue Acorn Press, 2011.
- Beach, John N. History of the Fortieth Ohio Volunteer Infantry. London, Ohio: Shepherd & Craig Printers, 1884.
- Bering, John, and Thomas Montgomery. History of the Forty-eighth Ohio Veteran Volunteer Infantry. Hillsboro, Ohio: The Highland News Office, 1880.
- Blackburn, Theodore W. Letters from the Front; A Union "Preacher" Regiment (74th Ohio) in the Civil War. Dayton, Ohio: Press of Morningside House, Inc., 1981.
- Brown, J. Willard. Record of Service of Company K, One Hundred and Fiftieth Ohio O.V.I., 1864. no publisher, 1903.
- Canfield, Silas S. History of the 21st Regiment Ohio Volunteer Infantry, in the War of the Rebellion. Toledo, Ohio: Vrooman, Anderson and Bateman, 1893.
- Cannon, James. Memorial, One Hundred Fiftieth Ohio, Company K. no publisher, 1907.
- Carroon, Robert Girard. From Freeman's Ford to Bentonville: The 61st Ohio Volunteer Infantry. Mechanicsburg, Pennsylvania: Burd Street Press, 1998.
- Chamberlain, W.H. History of the Eighty-first Regiment, Ohio Infantry Volunteers, During the War of the Rebellion. Cincinnati, Ohio: Peak Brothers, 1902.
- Chase, John A. History of the Fourteenth Ohio Regiment, O.V.V.I., From the Beginning of the War in 1861 to Its Close in 1865. Toledo, Ohio: St. John Print House, 1881.
- Clark, Charles T. Opdycke Tigers: 125th O.V.I. A History of the Regiment and of the Campaigns and Battles of the Army of the Cumberland. Columbus, Ohio: Spahr and Glenn, 1895.
- Connelly, Thomas W. History of the Seventieth Ohio Regiment. Cincinnati, Ohio: Peak Bohrs, 1902.
- Cope, Alexis. The Fifteenth Ohio Volunteers and Its Campaigns, War of 1861–1865. Columbus, Ohio: published by author, 1916.
- Cooper, Edward S. The Brave Men of Company A: The Forty–First Ohio Volunteer Infantry. Madison, Ohio: Farleigh Dickenson University Press, 2015.
- Crofts, Thomas. History of the Third Ohio Cavalry, 1861–1865. Toledo, Ohio: Stoneman Press, 1910.
- Curry, William L. Four Years in the Saddle: History of the First Regiment Ohio Volunteer Cavalry, 1861–1865. Jonesboro, Georgia: Freedom Hill Press, 1984.
- Cutter, O.P. Our Battery: Or the Journal of Company B. 1st O.V.A.. Cleveland, Ohio: Nevins' Book and Job Printing Establishment, 1865.
- Davidson, Henry M. History of Battery A, First Regiment of Ohio Vol. Light Artillery. Milwaukee, Wisconsin: Daily Wisconsin Steam Printing House, 1865.
- Day, L.W. Story of the One Hundred and First Ohio Infantry. Cleveland, Ohio: W.M. Bayne Printing Co., 1894.
- Demoret, Alfred. A Brief History of the Ninety-Third Regiment Ohio Volunteer Infantry: Recollections of a Private. Ross, Ohio: Graphic Printing, 1898.
- DeVelling, Charles T. History of the Seventeenth Regiment, First Brigade, Third Division, Fourteenth Corps, Army of the Cumberland, War of the Rebellion. E.R. Sullivan, Printer and Binder, 1880. (17th Ohio Infantry)
- Duke, John K. (1900). History of the Fifty-third regiment Ohio volunteer infantry, during the war of the rebellion, 1861 to 1865. Portsmouth, O., The Blade printing company.
- Ford, Ebenezer Hana. The Story of a Regiment: A History of the Campaigns, and Associations in the Field of the Sixth Regiment, Ohio Volunteer Infantry. Cincinnati, Ohio: published by the author, 1868.
- Fritsch, James T. The Untried Life: The Twenty-Ninth Ohio Volunteer Infantry in the Civil War. Athens, Ohio: Ohio University Press, 2012. ISBN 978-0-8040-1139-6.
- Fugitt, Greg. Fantastic Shadows Upon the Ground: The Thirty–Fifth Ohio Volunteer Infantry in the Civil War. Milford, Ohio: Little Miami Publishing Co., 2011.
- Gillespie, Samuel L. A History of Company A, First Ohio Cavalry, 1861–1865. Washington Court House, Ohio: Press of Ohio State Register, 1898.
- Gilson, J.H. Concise History of the One Hundred and Twenty-sixth Regiment, Ohio Volunteer Infantry, from the Date of Organization to the End of the Rebellion; With a complete Roster of Each Company, From Date of Muster. Salem, Ohio: Walton, Steam Job and Label Printer, 1883.
- Gleason, William J. Historical Sketch of the One Hundred and Fiftieth Regiment Ohio Volunteer Infantry: Roster of the Regiment. Rocky River, Ohio: no publisher listed, 1899.
- Grebner, Constantin. We Were the Ninth: A History of the Ninth Regiment, Ohio Volunteer Infantry April 17, 1861, to June 7, 1864, translated and edited by Frederic Trautmann. Kent, Ohio: Kent State University Press, 1987.
- Hannaford, Edwin. The Story of a Regiment: A History of the Campaigns, and Associations in the Field, of the Sixth Regiment Ohio Volunteer Infantry. Cincinnati, Ohio: published by author, 1868.
- Hays, Ebenezer Z. History of the Thirty-second Regiment: Ohio Veteran Volunteer Infantry. Cott & Evans, 1896.
- Hill, Jeffrey A. The 26th Ohio Veteran Volunteer Infantry: The Groundhog Regiment. Bloomington, Indiana: AuthorHouse, 2010. ISBN 978-1-4520-3388-4.
- Holmes, James Taylor. Fifty-second Ohio Volunteer Infantry: Then and Now. Columbus, Ohio: Berlin Printing Co., 1898.
- Hurst, Samuel H. Journal-History of the Seventy-Third Ohio Volunteer Infantry. Chillingcothe, 1866.
- Keil, F.W. Thirty-fifth Ohio: A Narrative of Service From August, 1861 to 1864. Fort Wayne, Indiana: Housh and Company, 1894.
- Kelly, Weldon. A Historic Sketch, Lest We Forget - Company "E", 26th Ohio Infantry in the War for the Union 1861-1865. no publisher listed, 1909.
- Kepler, William. History of the 4th Regiment of Ohio Volunteers. Cleveland, Ohio: published by author, 1886.
- Kern, Albert, ed. History of the First Regiment Ohio Volunteer Infantry in the Civil War 1861-1865. no publisher listed, 1918.
- Keyes, Charles M., ed. The Military History of the 123rd Regiment of Ohio Volunteer Infantry. Sandusky, Ohio: Register Steam Press, 1874.
- Kimberly, Robert and Ephraim Holloway. The 41st Ohio Veteran Volunteer Infantry in the War of the Rebellion. Cleveland, Ohio: W.R. Smellie, 1897.
- Lambert, Lois J. Heroes of the Western Theater: 33rd Ohio Veteran Volunteer Infantry. Little Miami Publishing Co., 2008.
- Lecke, Jim, editor. A Hundred Days to Richmond: Ohio's "Hundred Days" Men in the Civil War. Bloomington, Indiana: Indiana University Press, 1999.
- Lewis, George W. The Campaigns of the 124th Regiment, Ohio Volunteer Infantry with Roster and Roll of Honor. Akron, Ohio: The Werner Co., 1894.
- Mason, Frank H. The Twelfth Ohio Cavalry. Cleveland, Ohio: Nevin's Printing, 1871.
- McAdams, F.M. Every-Day Soldier Life, or a History of the One Hundred and Thirteenth Ohio Volunteer Inf. Columbus, Ohio: Charles M. Gott, Printers, 1884.
- McBride, Robert W. Lincoln's Body Guard: The Union Light Guard of Ohio with Some Personal Recollections of Abraham Lincoln. Indianapolis, Indiana: Edward J. Hecker, 1911.
- McCray, Kevin B. A Shouting of Orders: A History of the 99th Ohio Volunteer Infantry Regiment. Xlibris Corporation, 2003.
- Osborn, Hartwell. Trials and Triumphs: The Record of the Fifty-Fifth Ohio Volunteer Infantry. A.C. McClurg, 1904.
- Palmer, Jewett and John Alexander Palmer. The Salem Light Guard: Company G 36th Regiment, Ohio Volunteer Infantry, Marietta, Ohio, 1861–5. Adams Press, 1973.
- Pope, Thomas E. The Weary Boys: Colonel J. Warren Keifer & the 110th Ohio Volunteer Infantry. Kent, Ohio: Kent State University Press, 2003.
- Rankin, Richard C. History of the Seventh Ohio Volunteer Cavalry. J.C. Newcomb, Printer, 1881.
- Saunier, Joseph A., ed. A History of the Forty-seventh Ohio Veteran Volunteer Infantry. Hillsboro, Ohio: Lyle Printing Co., 1903.
- Sawyer, Franklin A. A Military History of the 8th Regiment Ohio Vol. Inf'y: Its Battles, Marches and Army Movements. edited by George A. Groot. Cleveland, Ohio: Fairbanks, 1881.
- Se Cheverall, J. Journal History of the 29th Ohio. Cleveland, Ohio: published by author, 1883.
- Smith, Charles H. The History of Fuller's Ohio Brigade, 1861–1865. Cleveland, Ohio: Press of A.J. Watt, 1909.
- Smith, Jacob. Camps and Campaigns of the 107th Regiment Ohio Volunteer Infantry. Naverre, Ohio: Indian River Graphics, 2000.
- Staats, Richard J. The History of the Sixth Ohio Volunteer Cavalry 1861–1865: A Journal of Patriotism, Duty, and Bravery, two volumes. Westminster, Maryland: Heritage Books, 2006.
- Stewart, Nixon B. Dan McCook's Regiment, 52nd O.V.I. Alliance, Ohio: Review Print, 1900.
- Stevenson, Thomas. History of the 78th Ohio Volunteer Infantry, From Its "Muster' in" to Its "Muster' out". Zanesville, Ohio: Hugh Dunne, 1865.
- Stewart, Nixon B. Dan McCook's Regiment: 52nd O.V.I. A History of the Regiment, Its Campaigns and Battles. Alliance, Ohio: Review Print, 1900.
- Tourgee, Albron W. The Story of a Thousand: Being the History of the Service of the 105th Ohio Volunteer Infantry, in the War for the Union from August 21, 1862 to June 6, 1865. Buffalo, New York: McGerald and Son 1896.
- Tracie, Theodore C. Annals of the Nineteenth Ohio Battery; or, Lights and Shadows of Army Life. Cleveland, Ohio: J.B. Savage, 1878.
- Ward, James E.D. Twelfth Ohio Volunteer Inf. Ripley, Ohio: 1864.
- Werrell, Kenneth P. Crook's Regulars: The 36th Ohio Volunteer Infantry Regiment in the War of Rebellion. CreateSpace Independent Publishing Platform, 2012.
- Wildes, Thomas F. Record of the One Hundred and Sixteenth Regiment, Ohio Infantry Volunteers in the War of the Rebellion. Sandusky, Ohio: O.I.F., 1884.
- Williams, Richard Brady. Chicago's Battery Boys: The Chicago Mercantile Battery in the American Civil War. New York: Savas Beatie.
- Windsor, A.H. History of the Ninety–First Regiment, O.V.I. Cincinnati, Ohio: Gazette Steam Printing House, 1865.
- Wood, D.W. History of the 20th Ohio Volunteer Veteran Infantry Regiment, 1861–1865. Columbus, Ohio: Paul and Thrall Book and Job Printers, 1876.
- Wood, George L. History of the 7th Ohio. New York: J. Miller, 1865.
- Woods, Joseph T. Services of the 96th Ohio Volunteers. Toledo, Ohio: Blade Printing and Paper, 1874.
- Worthington, Thomas. Brief History of the 46th Ohio Volunteers. Washington, D.C.: published by author, 1878.
- Wulsin, Lucien. The Story of the Fourth Regiment, Ohio Veteran Volunteer Cavalry, 1861–1865. Cincinnati, Ohio: no publisher listed, 1912.

=== Oklahoma units ===
- Britton, Wiley. The Union Indian Brigade in the Civil War. Topeka, Kansas: Kansas Heritage Press, 1994.

=== Pennsylvania units ===
- Authored by members of Pennsylvania infantry, 121st regt History of the 121st Regiment Pennsylvania Volunteers. Philadelphia, Pennsylvania: Catholic Standard and Times Press, 1906.
- (no author listed) History of the 127th Regiment Pennsylvania Volunteers, Familiarly Known as the "Dauphin County Regiment". Lebanon, Pennsylvania: Press of Report Pub., 1902.
- (no author listed) History of the Corn Exchange Regiment, 118th Pennsylvania Volunteers. Philadelphia, Pennsylvania: J.L. Smith, 1888.
- (no author listed) History of the Eighteenth Regiment of Cavalry, Pennsylvania Volunteers 1862–1865. New York: Wynkoop, Hallenbenck, Crawford, 1909.
- (no author listed) One Hundred and Thirtieth Regiment Pennsylvania Volunteer Infantry: Ceremonies and Addresses at Dedication of Monument at Bloody Lane, Antietam Battlefield, September 17, 1904. no publisher listed, 1904.
- Albert, Allen Diehl. History of the Forty-Fifth Regiment Pennsylvania Veteran Volunteer Infantry, 1861–1865. Williamsport, Pennsylvania: Grit Publishing Co., 1912.
- Alexander, Ted. The 126th Pennsylvania. Shippensburg, Pennsylvania: Beidel Printing House, 1984.
- Allen, E. Jay, John Ewing, S.W. Hill, Charles F. McKenna, John H. Kerr, John C. Sias, and John T. Porter. Under the Maltese Cross: Antietam to Appomattox: The Loyal Uprising of Western Pennsylvania, 1861–1865: Campaigns–155th Pennsylvania Regiment, Narrated by the Rank and File. Pittsburgh, Pennsylvania: The 155th Regimental Association, 1910.
- Bailey, Chester P. Mansfield Men in the Seventh Pennsylvania Cavalry 1861–1865. Mansfield, Pennsylvania: published by the author, 1986.
- Banes, Charles H. A History of the Philadelphia Brigade: Sixty-Ninth, Seventy-First, Seventy-Second, and One Hundred and Sixth Pennsylvania Volunteers. Philadelphia, Pennsylvania: J.B. Lippincott & Co., 1876.
- Birch, Harold B. The 101st Pennsylvania in the Civil War: Its Capture and Pow Experience: The Saga of a Lucky Bedford, PA, Lieutenant and his Unlucky Regiment. Bloomington, Indiana: AuthorHouse, 2007. ISBN 978-1-4259-8218-8.
- Bosbyshell, Oliver Christian. The 48th in the War, Being a Narrative of the 48th Regiment, Infantry, Pennsylvania Veteran Volunteers, during the War of the Rebellion. Philadelphia, Pennsylvania: Avil Printing Co., 1895.
- Boyle, John Richards. Soldiers True: The Story of the One Hundred and Eleventh Regiment Pennsylvania Veteran Volunteers and of Its Campaigns in the War for the Union, 1861–1865. New York: Eaton & Wains, 1903.
- Brady, James P., ed. Hurrah for the Artillery!: Knap's Independent Battery "E", Pennsylvania Light Artillery. Gettysburg, Pennsylvania: Thomas, 1992.
- Brandt, Dennis W. From Home Guards to Heroes: The 87th Pennsylvania and Its Civil War Community. Columbia, Missouri: University of Missouri Press, 2006.
- Brewer, A.T. History of the Sixty-first Regiment Pennsylvania Volunteers 1861–1865. Pittsburgh, Pennsylvania: Art Engraving & Printing Co., 1911.
- Brooke-Rawle, William, ed. History of the Third Pennsylvania Cavalry in the American Civil War of 1861–1865. Philadelphia, Pennsylvania: Franklin Printing Co., 1905.
- Chamberlain, Thomas. History of the One Hundred and Fiftieth Regiment Pennsylvania Volunteers, Second Regiment, Bucktail Brigade. Philadelphia, Pennsylvania: J.B. Lippincott, Co., 1895.
- Copeland, Willis R. The Logan Guards of Lewistown, Pennsylvania: Our First Defenders of 1861. Lewistown, Pennsylvania: Mifflin County Historical Society, 1962.
- Corrigan, Jim. The 48th Pennsylvania in the Battle of the Crater: A Regiment of Coal Miners Who Tunneled Under the Enemy. Jefferson, North Carolina: McFarland & Company, Inc., 2012. ISBN 978-0-7864-6910-9.
- Craft, David. History of the One Hundred Forty-First Regiment, Pennsylvania Volunteers, 1862–1865. Towanda, Pennsylvania: Reporter-Journal Printing Co., 1885.
- Cuffel, Charles A. History of Durell's Battery in the Civil War (Independent Battery D, Pennsylvania Volunteer Artillery): A Narrative of the Campaigns and Battles of Berks and Bucks Counties' Artillerists in the War of the Rebellion from the Battery's Organization, September 24, 1861, to Its Muster Out of Service, June 13, 1865. Philadelphia: Craig Finley, 1903.
- Davis, William W.H. History of the 104th Pennsylvania Regiment. Philadelphia, Pennsylvania: James B. Rodgers, 1866.
- Dickey, Luther S. History of the 103rd Regiment Pennsylvania Veteran Volunteer Infantry. Chicago, Illinois: L.S. Dickey, 1910.
- Dickey, Luther S. History of the Eighty-fifth Regiment Pennsylvania Volunteer Infantry, 1861-1865. New York: J.C. & W.E. Powers, 1915.
- Domblaser, T.F. Saber Strokes of the Pennsylvania Dragoons, in the War of 1861–1865. Philadelphia, Pennsylvania: Lutheran Publication Society, 1884. (7th Pennsylvania Cavalry)
- Doster, William E. A Brief History of the Fourth Pennsylvania Cavalry Embracing Organization, Reunions, Dedication of Monument at Gettysburg and Address of General W.E. Doster, Venango County Battalion, Reminiscences, Etc. Hightstown, New Jersey: Longstreet House, 1997.
- Dreese, Michael. The 151st Pennsylvania Volunteers at Gettysburg: Like Ripe Apples in a Storm. Jefferson, North Carolina: McFarland & Company, Inc., 2009. ISBN 978-0-7864-4577-6.
- Ent, Uzal W. The Pennsylvania Reserves in the Civil War: A Comprehensive History. Jefferson, North Carolina: McFarland & Company, Inc., 2013. ISBN 978-0-7864-4872-2.
- Farrar, Samuel C. The Twenty-Second Pennsylvania Cavalry and the Ringgold Battalion, 1861–1865. Pittsburgh, Pennsylvania: 22nd Pennsylvania Cavalry Association, 1911.
- Gancas, Ron The Gallant Seventy–Eighth: Stones River to Pickett's Mill, Colonel William Sirwell and the Pennsylvania Seventy–Eighth Volunteer Infantry. Murraysville, Pennsylvania: Mark V Enterprises, 1994.
- Gavin, William Gilfillan. Campaigning with the Roundheads: A History of the 100th Pennsylvania Volunteer Infantry Regiment in the American Civil War 1861–1865. Dayton, Ohio: Morningside, 1989.
- Gibbs, James M., ed. History of the First Battalion Pennsylvania Six Months Volunteers and 187th Regiment Pennsylvania Volunteer Infantry. Harrisburg, Pennsylvania: Central Printing and Publishing House, 1905.
- Gibbs, Joseph. Three Years in the "Bloody Eleventh": The Campaigns of a Pennsylvania Reserve Regiment. State College, Pennsylvania: Penn State Press, 2002.
- Glover, Edwin A. Bucktailed Wildcats: A Regiment of Civil War Volunteers. New York: Thomas Yoseloff, 1960.
- Gottfried, Bradley M. Stopping Pickett: The History of the Philadelphia Brigade. Shippensburg, Pennsylvania: White Mane Publishing Co., Inc. ISBN 1-57249-164-7.
- Gould, Joseph. The Story of the Forty–Eighth: A Record of the Campaigns of the Forty–Eighth Regiment Pennsylvania Pennsylvania Veteran Volunteer Infantry. Philadelphia, Pennsylvania: Regimental Association, 1908.
- Gracey, Samuel L. Annals of the Sixth Pennsylvania Cavalry. Philadelphia, Pennsylvania: E.H. Butler & Co., 1868.
- Hagerty, Edward J. Collis' Zouaves: The 114th Pennsylvania Volunteers in the Civil War. Baton Rouge, Louisiana: Louisiana State University Press, 1997.
- Hand, Harold. One Good Regiment: The 13th Pennsylvania Cavalry in the Civil War, 1861–1865. Victoria, British Columbia: Trafford Publishing, 2000.
- Hardin, M.D. History of the Twelfth Regiment Pennsylvania Reserve Volunteer Corps (41st Regiment of the Line), from Its Muster into the United States Service, August 10, 1861, to Its Muster out, June 11, 1864. New York: M.D. Hardin, 1890.
- Hays, Gilbert Adams. Under the Red Patch: Story of the Sixty Third Regiment Pennsylvania Volunteers 1861–1865. Pittsburgh, Pennsylvania: Sixty-third Pa. Vols. Regimental Assoc., 1908.
- Hays, John. The 130th Regiment, Pennsylvania Volunteers in the Maryland Campaign and the Battle of Antietam: An Address Delivered Jun 7, 1894, before Cpt. Cowell Post 201 G.A.R. Carlisle, Pennsylvania: Herald Print, 1894.
- Judson, A.M. History of the Eighty-Third Regiment Pennsylvania Volunteers. Erie, Pennsylvania: B.F.H. Lynn, 1865.
- Keifer, William R. History of the One Hundred and Fifty-Third Regiment Pennsylvania Volunteer Infantry. Easton: Press of the Chemical Publishing Company, 1909.
- Kirk, Charles H., ed. History of the Fifteenth Pennsylvania Volunteer Cavalry Which Was Recruited and Known as the Anderson Cavalry in the Rebellion of 1861-1865. Philadelphia, Pennsylvania: no publisher listed, 1906.
- Lash, Gary G. "Duty Well Done": The History of Edward Baker's California Regiment (71st Pennsylvania Infantry). Baltimore, Maryland: Butternut and Blue, 2001.
- Lewis, Osceola. History of the One Hundred and Thirty-Eighth Pennsylvania. Norristown, Pennsylvania: Wills, Tredell and Jenkins, 1866.
- Lloyd, William P. History of the First Reg't. Pennsylvania Reserve Cavalry, From Its Organization, August, 1861, to September, 1864, With a List of Names of All Officers and Enlisted Men Who Have Ever Belonged to the Regiment. Philadelphia, Pennsylvania: King & Baird, 1864.
- Macneal, Douglas. "The Centre County Regiment": Story of the 148th Regiment Pennsylvania Volunteers. State College, Pennsylvania: Centre County Historical Society, 2000.
- Maier, Larry B. Leather & Steel: The 12th Pennsylvania Cavalry in the Civil War. Shippensburg, Pennsylvania: White Mane Publishing Co., Inc. ISBN 1-57249-273-2.
- Maier, Larry B. Rough and Regular: A History of Philadelphia's 119th Regiment of Pennsylvania Volunteer Infantry, The Gray Reserves. Shippensburg, Pennsylvania: Burd Street Press, 1997.
- Maier, Larry B. Rough & Regular: A History of Philadelphia's 119th Regiment of Pennsylvania Volunteer Infantry, The Gray Reserves. Shippensburg, Pennsylvania: White Mane Publishing Co., Inc. ISBN 1-57249-082-9.
- Mark, Penrose G. Red: White: and Blue Badge: Pennsylvania Volunteers. A History of the 93rd Regiment, Known as the "Lebanon Infantry" and "One of the 300 Fighting Regiments" from September 12, 1861 to June 27, 1865. published by author, 1911.
- Marshall, D. Porter. Company "K" 155th Pennsylvania Volunteer Zouaves. no publisher, 1888.
- Martin, James, et al. History of the 57th Regiment, Pennsylvania Veteran Volunteer Infantry. Meadeville, Pennsylvania: McCoy and Calvin, 1904.
- Matthews, Richard E. The 149th Pennsylvania Volunteer Infantry Unit in the Civil War. Jefferson, North Carolina: McFarland & Co., 1994.
- Miller, Charles H. History of the 16th Regiment Pennsylvania Cavalry, for the Year Ending October 31, 1863. Philadelphia, Pennsylvania: King & Baird, printers, 1863.
- Moyer, Henry P. History of the Seventeenth Regiment Pennsylvania Volunteer Cavalry. Lebanon, Pennsylvania: Sowers Printing Co., 1911.
- Muffly, J.W., ed., The Story of Our Regiment: A History of the 148th Pennsylvania Vos. Des Moines, Iowa: Kenyon Printing Co., 1911.
- Mulholland, St. Clair. The Story of the 116th Regiment Pennsylvania Volunteers in the War of the Rebellion: The Record of a Gallant Command. Philadelphia, Pennsylvania: F. McManus, Jr. & Co., 1903.
- Myers, Irvin G. We Might as Well Die Here: The 53rd Pennsylvania Veteran Volunteer Infantry. Shippensburg, Pennsylvania: White Mane, 2004.
- Nesbit, John W. General History of Company D, One Hundred and Forty-Ninth Pennsylvania Volunteers. Oakdale, California: Oakdale Printing & Publishing Co., 1908.
- Niebaum, John H. History of the Pittsburgh Washington Infantry 102nd (Old 13th) Regiment Pennsylvania Veteran Volunteers and Its Forebears. Pittsburgh, Pennsylvania: no publisher listed, 1931.
- Obreiter, John. The Seventy-Seventh Pennsylvania at Shiloh. History of the Regiment. Harrisburg Publishing Company, 1905.
- Orwig, Joseph R. History of the 131st Penna. Volunteers, War of 1861-65. Williamsport, Pennsylvania: Sun Book and Job Printing House, 1902.
- Parker, Thomas H. History of the 51st Regiment of P.V. and V.V. from Its Organization at Camp Curtin, Harrisburg, Pa., in 1861, to Its Being Mustered Out of the United States Service at Alexandria, Va., July 27, 1865. Philadelphia, Pennsylvania: King & Baird, 1869.
- Powelson, B.F. History of Company K of the 140th Regiment Pennsylvania Volunteers, 1862–1865. Steubenville, Ohio: The Carnahan Printing Co., 1906.
- Price, Isaiah. History of the 9th Regiment of Pennsylvania Volunteer Infantry. Philadelphia, Pennsylvania: no publisher, 1875.
- Price, Isaiah. History of the Ninety–Seventh Regiment, Pennsylvania Volunteer Infantry, during the War of the Rebellion, 1861–65, with the Biographical Sketches of Its Field and Staff Officers and a Complete Record of Each Officer and Enlisted Man. Philadelphia, Pennsylvania: B. & P. Printers, 1875
- Prowell, George R. History of the Eighty-Seventh Regiment, Pennsylvania Volunteers. York, Pennsylvania: Press of the York Daily, 1903.
- Rawle Brooke, William, William E. Miller, James W. McCorkell, Andrew J. Speese, and John C. Hunterson. History of the Third Pennsylvania Cavalry, Sixtieth Regiment Pennsylvania Volunteers in the American Civil War, 1861–1865. Philadelphia, Pennsylvania: Franklin Printing Company, 1905.
- Reed, John A. History of the 101st Regiment Pennsylvania Veteran Volunteer Infantry, 1861-1865. Chicago: L.S. Dickey, 1910.
- Regimental History Committee. History of the 3d Pennsylvania Cavalry. Philadelphia, Pennsylvania: Franklin Printing, 1905.
- Roberts, Agatha Louise. As They Remembered: The Story of the Forty-fifth Pennsylvania Veteran Volunteer Infantry Regiment, 1861-1865. New York: William-Frederick Press, 1964.
- Rodenbough, Theophilus F. History of the Eighteenth Regiment of Cavalry Pennsylvania Volunteers 1862–1865. New York: Regimental Publication Committee, 1909.
- Roper, John L., Henry C. Archibald, and G.W. Coles. History of the Eleventh Pennsylvania Volunteer Cavalry together with a Complete Roster of the Regiment and Regimental officers. Philadelphia, Pennsylvania: Franklin Printing Company, 1902.
- Rowell, John W. Yankee Cavalrymen: Through the Civil War with the Ninth Pennsylvania Cavalry. Knoxville, Tennessee: University of Tennessee Press, 1971.
- Schelhammer, Michael. The 83rd Pennsylvania Volunteers in the Civil War. Jefferson, North Carolina: McFarland & Co., 2003.
- Scott, Kate M. History of the One Hundred and Fifth Regiment of Pennsylvania Volunteers: A Complete History of the Organization, Marches, Battles, Toils, and Dangers Participated in by the Regiment from the Beginning to the Close of the War. Philadelphia, Pennsylvania: New-World Publishing, 1877.
- Sipes, William B. The Seventh Pennsylvania Veteran Volunteer Cavalry. Pottsville, Pennsylvania: Miners' Journal Print, no date listed.
- Slease, William D. The Fourteenth Pennsylvania Cavalry in the Civil War. Pittsburgh, Pennsylvania: Art Engraving and Printing, no date listed.
- Smith, John L. History of the Corn Exchange Regiment 118th Pennsylvania Volunteers, From Their First Engagement at Antietam to Appomattox. Philadelphia, Pennsylvania: J. L. Smith, 1886.
- Speese, Andrew Jackson. Story of Companies H, A and C Third Pennsylvania Cavalry at Gettysburg July 3, 1863. Philadelphia, Pennsylvania: published by the author, 1907.
- Spisak, Ernest D. Pittsburgh's Forgotten Civil War Regiment: A History of the 62nd Pennsylvania Volunteer Infantry. Word Assn Pub, November 2013.
- Stewart, Robert L. History of the One Hundred and Fortieth Regiment Pennsylvania Volunteers. Philadelphia, Pennsylvania: published by the authority of the Regimental Association, 1912.
- Stocker, Jeffery D. "We Fought Desperate": A History of the 153rd Pennsylvania Volunteer Infantry Regiment. Self-published, 2014.
- Strong, William. History of the 121st Regiment, Pennsylvania Volunteers. Philadelphia, Pennsylvania: Burk & McFetridge Company, 1893.
- Sypher, J.R. History of the Pennsylvania Reserve Corps. Lancaster, Pennsylvania: Elias Barr & Co., 1865.
- Thomson, O.R. Howard and William H. Rauch. History of the "Bucktails" Kane Rifle Regiment of the Pennsylvania Reserve Corps (135th Pennsylvania Reserves, 42nd of the Line). Philadelphia, Pennsylvania: Electric Printing Co., 1906.
- Vautier, John D. History of the Eighty-Eighth Pennsylvania Volunteers in the War for the Union, 1861–1865. Philadelphia, Pennsylvania: J.B. Lippincott Co., 1894.
- Veale, Moses. The 109th Regiment Penna. Veteran Volunteers. Philadelphia, Pennsylvania: no publisher, 1890.
- Ward, George W. History of the Second Pennsylvania Veteran Heavy Artillery (112th Regiment Pennsylvania Volunteers) from 1861 to 1866, Including the Provisional Second Penn'a. Heavy Artillery. Philadelphia, Pennsylvania: George W. Ward Printer, 1904.
- Ward, Joseph R.C. History of the One Hundred and Sixth Regiment Pennsylvania Volunteers. Philadelphia, Pennsylvania: Grant Faires and Rodgers, 1883.
- Westbrook, Robert S. History of the 49th Pennsylvania Volunteers. Altoona, Pennsylvania: Altoona Times, 1898.
- Wilson, Suzanne Colton. Column South with the Fifteenth Pennsylvania Cavalry From Antietam to the Capture of Jefferson Davis. J.F. Colton & Co., 1960.
- Wittenberg, Eric J. Rush's Lancers: The Sixth Pennsylvania Cavalry in the Civil War. Yardley, Pennsylvania: Westholme Publishing, 2006.
- Woodward, E.M. History of the Third Pennsylvania Reserve. Trenton, New Jersey: MacCrellish and Quigley, 1883.
- Woodward, E.M. History of the 198th Pennsylvania Regiment. Trenton, New Jersey: 1884.
- Woodward, Evan Morrison. Our Campaigns: The Second Regiment Pennsylvania Reserve Volunteers, edited by Stanley W. Zambonski. Shippensburg, Pennsylvania: Burd Street Press, 1995.
- Wray, William. History of the 23rd Pennsylvania Infantry. Harrisburg, Pennsylvania: Survivors Assoc. of the 23rd Pennsylvania Volunteer Infantry, 1898.

=== Rhode Island units ===
- Aldrich, Thomas M. The History of Battery A, First Regiment Rhode Island Light Artillery in the War to Preserve the Union, 1861–1865. Providence, Rhode Island: Snow and Farnham, 1904.
- Allen, George H. Forty–six Months in the Fourth R.I. Volunteers, in the War of 1861 to 1865, Comprising a History of its Marches, Battles, and Camp Life, Compiled from Journals Kept While on Duty in the Field and Camp. Providence, Rhode Island: J.A. & R.A. Ried, 1887
- Bliss, George. The First Rhode Island Cavalry at Middleburg. Providence, Rhode Island: published by author, 1889.
- Chase, Philip S. Battery F, First Regiment Rhode Island Light Artillery in the Civil War, 1861–1865. Providence, Rhode Island: Snow & Farnham, 1892.
- Chenery, William H. The Fourteenth Regiment Rhode Island Heavy Artillery (Colored), in the War to Preserve the Union, 1861–1865. Snow & Farnham, Printers and Publishers, 1898.
- Corliss, A.W. History of the Seventh Squadron Rhode Island Cavalry, by a Member. Yarmouth, Rhode Island: "Old Times" Office, 1879.
- Denison, Frederic. Sabres and Spurs: The First Rhode Island Cavalry in the Civil War. Providence, Rhode Island: First Rhode Island Cavalry Veteran Assoc., 1876.
- Denison, Frederic. Shot and Shell: The Third Rhode Island Heavy Artillery Regiment, in the Rebellion 1861–1865 – Camps, Forts, Batteries, Garrison, Marches, Skirmishes, Sieges, Battles, and Victories; also the Roll of Honor and Roll of the Regiment. Providence, Rhode Island: J.A. & R.A. Reid, 1879.
- Fenner, Earl. The History of Battery H, First Regiment Rhode Island Light Artillery, in the War to preserve the Union 1861–1865. Providence, Rhode Island: Snow & Farnham, Printers, 1894.
- Hopkins, William P. The Seventh Regiment Rhode Island Volunteers in the Civil War, 1862–1865. Providence, Rhode Island: Snow and Farnham, 1903.
- Grandchamp, Robert. The Boys of Adams’ Battery G: The Civil War Through the Eyes of a Union Light Artillery Unit. Jefferson, North Carolina: McFarland & Company, Inc., 2009. ISBN 978-0-7864-4473-1.
- Grandchamp, Robert. The Seventh Rhode Island Infantry in the Civil War. Jefferson, North Carolina: McFarland & Company, Inc., 2008. ISBN 978-0-7864-3200-4.
- Lewis, George. The History of Battery E, First Regiment Rhode Island Light Artillery. Providence, Rhode Island: Snow and Farnham, 1892.
- Rhodes, John H. The History of Battery B, First Regiment Rhode Island Light Artillery, in the War to Preserve the Union, 1861-1865. Providence, Rhode Island: Snow and Farnham, 1894.
- Spicer, William Arnold. History of the Ninth and Tenth Regiments Rhode Island Volunteers, and the Tenth Rhode Island Battery in the Union Army in 1862. Providence, Rhode Island: Snow & Farnham, Printers, 1892.
- Straight, Charles T. Battery B, First R.I. Light Artillery, August 13, 1861 – June 12, 1865. Central Falls, Rhode Island: E.L. Freeman, 1907.
- Rhodes, John H. The History of Battery B, First Regiment Rhode Island Light Artillery in the War to Preserve the Union 1861–1865. Providence, Rhode Island: Snow and Farnham, 1894.
- Woodbury, Augustus. The Second Rhode Island Regiment: A Narrative of Military Operations. Providence, Rhode Island: Valpey, Angell & Company, 1875.

=== South Carolina units ===
- Ash, Stephen V. Firebrands of Liberty: The Story of Two Black Regiments That Changed the Course of the Civil War. (1st and 2nd South Carolina, African Descent). New York: W.W. Norton, 2008.

=== Tennessee units ===
- Andes, John W., and Will A. McTeer. Loyal Mountain Troopers: The Second and Third Tennessee Volunteer Cavalry in the Civil War. Maryville, Tennessee: Blount County Genealogical and Historical Society, 1992.
- Baggett, James Alex. Homegrown Yankees: Tennessee's Union Cavalry in the Civil War. Baton Rouge, Louisiana: Louisiana State University Press, 2009.
- Cannon, Robert K. Volunteers for Union and Liberty: History of the 5th Tennessee Infantry, U.S.A. 1862–1865. Knoxville, Tennessee: Bohemian Brigade Publishers, 1995.
- Carter, William Randolph. History of the First Regiment of Tennessee Volunteer Cavalry in the Great War of the Rebellion, With the Armies of the Ohio and Cumberland, Under Generals Morgan, Rosecrans, Thomas, Stanley, and Wilson. Knoxville, Tennessee: Gaut–Ogen Company, 1902.
- McCann, Kevin D. Hurst's Wurst: Colonel Fielding Hurst and the Sixth Tennessee Cavalry U.S.A.. McCann Publications, 2007. ISBN 978-0-9671251-2-1.
- Nikazy, Eddie M. Forgotten Soldiers: History of the 2nd Tennessee Volunteer Infantry Regiment (USA), 1861–1865. Heritage Books, 2009.
- Nikazy, Eddie M. Forgotten Soldiers: History of the 4th Tennessee Volunteer Infantry Regiment (USA), 1863–1865. Heritage Books, 1995.
- Scott, Samuel W. and Samuel P. Angel. History of the Thirteenth Regiment, Tennessee Volunteer Cavalry, U.S.A. Philadelphia, Pennsylvania: P.W. Ziegler & Company, 1903.

=== Texas units ===
- Thompson, Jerry D. Mexican Texans in the Union Army. El Paso, Texas: Texas Western Press, 1986. (2nd Texas Cavalry)

=== United States regular army and volunteer units ===
- Caughey, Donald C. and Jimmy J. Jones. The 6th United States Cavalry in the Civil War: A History and Roster. Jefferson, North Carolina: McFarland & Company, Inc., 2013. ISBN 978-0-7864-6835-5.
- Deibert, R.C. History of the Third United States Cavalry. Harrisburg, Pennsylvania: Telegraph Press, 1933.
- Earley, Gerald L. The Second United States Sharpshooters in the Civil War: A History and Roster. Jefferson, North Carolina: McFarland Publishers, 2009.
- Johnson, Mark W. That Body of Brave Men: The U.S. Regular Infantry and the Civil War in the West. New York: Da Capo Press, 2003.
- Lawson, Lauren L. History of the Sixth Field Artillery, 1793–1932. Harrisburg, Pennsylvania: Telegraph Press, 1933.
- Morgan III, James A. Always Ready, Always Willing: A History of Battery M, Second United States Artillery from Its Organization Through the Civil War. Gaithersburg, Maryland: Olde Soldier, no date.
- Newell, Clayton R. and Charles R. Shrader. Of Duty Well and Faithfully Done: A History of the Regular Army in the Civil War. Lincoln, Nebraska: University of Nebraska Press, 2011.
- Powell, William H. A History of the Organization and Movements of the Fourth Regiment of Infantry, United States Army, from May 30, 1796, to December 31, 1870, together with a Record of the Military Services of All Officers Who Have at Any Time Belonged to the Regiment. Washington, D.C.: M'Gill & Witherow, 1871.
- Reese, Timothy J. Syke's Regular Infantry Division:, 1861–1864: A History of Regular United States Infantry Operations in the Civil War's Eastern Theater. Jefferson, North Carolina: McFarland, 1990.
- Rodenbough, Theophilus F., comp. From Everglades to Canyon With the Second United States Cavalry: An Authentic Account of Service in Florida, Mexico, Virginia, and the Indian Country, 1836–1875. New York: D. Van Nostrand, 1875.
- Stevens, C.A. Berdan's United States Sharpshooters In the Army of the Potomac, 1861–1865. Dayton, Ohio: Morningside Bookshop, 1984.
- Thompson, Gilbert. The Engineer Battalion in the Civil War. Washington, D.C.: Press of the Engineer School, 1910.
- Wilhelm, Thomas. A Synopsis History of the Eighth U.S. Infantry. New York: Eight Infantry Headquarters, 1871.
- Wister, Francis. Recollections of the 12th U.S. Infantry & Regular Division. Philadelphia, Pennsylvania: no publisher listed, 1887.

=== United States Colored Troops units ===
- Bryant, II, James K. The 36th Infantry United States Colored Troops in the Civil War: A History and Roster. Jefferson, North Carolina: McFarland & Company, Inc., 2012. ISBN 978-0-7864-6878-2.
- Califf, Joseph. Record of the Services of the Seventh Regiment, U.S. Colored Troops from September 1863, to November, 1866. Providence, Rhode Island: E.L. Freeman & Company, 1878.
- Dennett, George M. History of the Ninth U.S.C. Troops from Its Organization till Mustered Out, with a List of Names of All Officers and Enlisted Men Who Have Ever Belonged to the Regiment, and Remarks Attached to Each Name, Noting All Changes, Such as Promotions, Transfers, Discharges, Deaths, Etc. Philadelphia, Pennsylvania: King & Baird, 1866.
- Dobak, William A. Freedom by the Sword: The U.S. Colored Troops 1862-1867. Government Printing Office.
- Gourdin, J. Raymond. Voices from the Past: 104th Infantry Regiment - USCT, Colored Civil War Soldiers from South Carolina. Heritage Books, 1997.
- Longacre, Edward G. A Regiment of Slaves: The 4th United States Colored Infantry, 1863–1866. Mechanicsburg, Pennsylvania: Stackpole Books, 2003.
- Mickley, Jeremiah Marion. The Forty-Third Regiment United States Colored Troops. Gettysburg, Pennsylvania: J.E. Wible, printer, 1866.
- Miller, Edward A., Jr. The Black Civil War Soldiers of Illinois: The Story of the Twenty-ninth U.S. Colored Infantry. Columbia: University of South Carolina Press, 1998.
- Washington, Versalle F. Eagles on Their Buttons: A Black Infantry Regiment in the Civil War. (5th U.S.C.T. Infantry) Columbia, Missouri: University of Missouri Press, 1999.

=== Vermont units ===
- Balzer, John, ed. Buck's Book: A View of the 3rd Vermont Infantry Regiment. Bolingbrook, Illinois: Balzer, 1993.
- Benedict, George G. A Short History of the 14th Vermont Regiment. Bennington, Vermont: Press of C.A. Pierce, 1887.
- Carpenter, George N. History of the Eighth Regiment Vermont Volunteers, 1861–1865. Boston, Massachusetts: Press of Deland & Barta, 1886.
- Collea, Jr., Joseph D. The First Vermont Cavalry in the Civil War: A History. Jefferson, North Carolina: McFarland, 2010. ISBN 978-0-7864-3383-4.
- Haynes, E.M. A History of the Tenth Regiment, Vermont Volunteers, With Biographical Sketches of the Officers Who Fell in Battle and a Complete Roster of all the Officers and Men Connected With It – Showing All Changes by Promotion, Death or Resignation, During the Military Existence of the Regiment. Lewiston, Maine: Tenth Vermont Regimental Assoc., 1870.
- Howard, Coffin. Nine Months to Gettysburg: Standard's Vermonters and the Repulse of Pickett's Charge. Woodstock, Vermont: The Countryman Press, 2011. ISBN 0-88150-400-9.
- Ide, Horace K. History of the 1st Vermont Cavalry Volunteers in the War of the Great Rebellion, edited by Elliot W. Hoffman. Baltimore, Maryland: Butternut & Blue, 2000.
- Parsons, George W. Put the Vermonters Ahead: The First Vermont Brigade in the Civil War. Shippensburg, Pennsylvania: White Mane Books, 2000.
- Sturtevant, Ralph Orson. Pictorial History Thirteenth Regiment Vermont Volunteers War of 1861-1865. Newport, Vermont: Tony O'Connor Civil War Enterprises, no date listed.
- Walker, Aldace F. The Vermont Brigade in the Shenandoah Valley, 1864. Burlington, Vermont: Free Press Association, 1869.
- Zeller, Paul G. The Second Vermont Volunteer Infantry Regiment, 1861–1865. Jefferson, North Carolina: McFarland, 2002.

=== Virginia units ===
- Goodhart, Briscoe. History of the Independent Loudoun Virginia Rangers, U.S. Vol. Cav. (Scouts), 1862–1865. Washington, D.C.: McGill and Wallace, 1896.

=== West Virginia units ===
- Fluharty, Linda C., and Edward L. Phillips. Carlin's Wheeling Battery: A History of Battery D. First West Virginia Light Artillery. Baton Rouge, Louisiana: published by authors, 2005.
- Hewitt, William. History of the 12th West Virginia Volunteer Infantry: The Part it Took in the War of the Rebellion, 1861–1865. 12th West Virginia Infantry Association, 1898.
- Rawling, Charles J. History of the First Regiment West Virginia Infantry. Philadelphia, Pennsylvania: Lippincott, 1887.
- Reader, Frank S. History of the Fifth West Virginia Cavalry, Formerly the Second Virginia Infantry, and Battery G, First West Virginia Light Artillery. New Brighton, West Virginia: Daily News, 1890.
- Sutton, Joseph J. History of the Second Regiment West Virginia Cavalry Volunteers, during the War of the Rebellion. Portsmouth, Ohio: no publisher listed, 1902.

=== Wisconsin units ===
- (no author listed) Story of the Service of Company E, and of the Twelfth Wisconsin Regiment, Veteran Volunteer Infantry, in the War of the Rebellion. Milwaukee, Wisconsin: Swain and Tate, 1893.
- (Anonymous) History of the Services of the Third Battery, Wisconsin Light Artillery in the Civil War of the United States, 1861–1865. Berlin, Wisconsin: Courant Press, no date listed.
- Aubrey, James Madison. The Thirty-Sixth Wisconsin Volunteer Infantry. Milwaukee, Wisconsin: Evening Wisconsin Company, 1900.
- Beaudot, William K. The 24th Wisconsin Infantry in the Civil War: The Biography of a Regiment. Mechanicsburg, Pennsylvania: Stackpole Books, 2003.
- Beaudot, William J.K. The 29th Wisconsin Infantry in the Civil War: The Biography of a Regiment. Mechanicsburg, Pennsylvania: Stackpole Books, 2003.
- Bradt, Hiram H.G. History of the Services of the Third Battery Wisconsin Light Artillery in the Civil War of the United States, 1861-65. Berlin, Wisconsin: Courant Press, 1902.
- Bryant, Edwin E. History of the Third Regiment of Wisconsin Veteran Volunteer Infantry 1861–1865. Madison, Wisconsin: Veteran Assoc. of the Reg't., 1891.
- Byrne, Frank L., ed. Uncommon Soldiers: Harvey Reid and the 22nd Wisconsin March with Sherman. Knoxville, Tennessee: University of Tennessee Press, 2001.
- Check, Philip, and Mas Pointon. History of the Sauk County Riflemen Known as Company "A", Sixth Wisconsin Veteran Volunteer Infantry, 1861–1865. Madison, Wisconsin: Democrat Printing Company, 1909.
- Eden, R.C. The Sword and the Gun: A History of the 37th Wis. Volunteer Infantry. Madison, Wisconsin: Atwood and Rublee, 1865.
- Gaff, Alan D. If This Is War: A History of the Campaign of Bull's Run by the Wisconsin Regiment Thereafter Known as the Ragged ### Second. Dayton, Ohio: Morningside House, 1991.
- Love, William DeLoss. Wisconsin in the War of the Rebellion: A History of All Regiments and Batteries. Chicago: Church & Goodman, 1866.
- Martin, Michael J. A History of the 4th Wisconsin Infantry and Cavalry in the Civil War. Savas Beatie, LLC, 2006. ISBN 978-1-932714-18-0.
- Otis, George H. The Second Wisconsin Infantry. Dayton, Ohio: Morningside House, 1984.
- Pierce, S.W. Battlefields and Camp Fires of the Thirty–Eighth: An Authentic Narrative and Record of the Organization of the Thirty–Eighth Regiment of Wis. Vol. Inf'y. and the Part Taken by It in the Late War, a Short Biographical Sketch of Each Commissioned Officer, and the Name, Age at Time of Enlistment, Nativity, Residence, and Occupation of Every Enlisted Man, with Notes of Incidents Relating to Them. Milwaukee, Wisconsin: Daily Wisconsin Printing House, 1866.
- Pula, James S. The Sigel Regiment: A History of the Twenty-sixth Wisconsin Volunteer Infantry, 1862-1865. Campbell, California: Savas, 1998.
- Tucker, W.H. The Fourteenth Wisconsin Vet. Vol. Infantry (General A.J. Smith's Command) in the Expedition and Battle of Tupelo; Also, Wanderings Through the Wilds of Missouri and Arkansas in Pursuit of Price. Indianapolis, Indiana: W.H. Tucker, 1892.
- West, Emmet C. History and Reminiscences of the Second Wisconsin Cavalry Regiment. Portage, Wisconsin: no publisher listed, 1904.
- Williams, John M. "The Eagle Regiment": Eighth Wis. Inf'ty Vols. Belleville, Wisconsin: 1890.
