= VVI =

VVI may stand for:

- Variable-voltage inverter, a type of variable-frequency drive system
- Venevisión International, a global television network broadcasting Spanish content
- Vermont Volunteer Infantry Regiments, a group of infantry regiments in the Union Army during the American Civil War
- Vertical velocity indicator, also known as variometer
- Viad Corp. (NYSE code: VVI), a marketing company
- Vinnie Vincent Invasion, an American glam metal band
- Viru Viru International Airport (IATA code: VVI), an aviation facility in Bolivia
