= Vermont Light Artillery Batteries =

Flag of Vermont, 1837–1923

During the American Civil War in the mid-19th century, the state of Vermont, United States, contributed 5 artillery units to the Union war effort.

The 1st Vermont Battery Light Artillery, or "Hebard's Battery," served in the Department of the Gulf of Mexico. The 2nd Battery, "Chase's Battery," also served in the Department of the Gulf. The 3rd Battery, "Start's Battery," served in the Eastern Theater with the Army of the Potomac.

The First Vermont Company Heavy Artillery was organized from recruits of the Second Vermont Battery Light Artillery.

The 11th Vermont Infantry was redesignated as the First Heavy Artillery, Eleventh Vermont Volunteers during its time in the defenses of Washington, but is usually grouped as part of the 1st Vermont Brigade.

== 1st Vermont Battery ==
The 1st Battery mustered into United States service on February 18, 1862, with 154 men, and gained 63 recruits during its career. George W. Duncan was the battery's first captain, but it is named after George T. Hebard, who assumed command on the resignation of Duncan on February 11, 1863.

Original members mustered out on August 10, 1864, and recruits were transferred to the 2nd Vermont Battery. The battery was engaged at Plain's Store, Louisiana, May 21, 1863, the Siege of Port Hudson, from May 25 to July 9, 1863, Pleasant Hill, on April 9, 1864, Monett's Ferry on April 23, 1864, and Yellow Bayou, or Bayou de Glaise, on May 18, 1864.

It suffered 3 killed in action or died of wounds, 42 died of disease, and 1 died from an accident, at total of 46 deaths. Other losses included 36 honorably discharged, 51 transferred to the Veteran Reserve Corps or other organizations, and 3 men who deserted. The battery suffered 7 men wounded.

== 2nd Vermont Battery ==
The 2nd Battery mustered into United States service on December 16, 1861, with 111 men, and gained 294 recruits and 51 men transferred from other batteries during its career. Lensie R. Sayles was the batteries first captain, but he resigned within two months. Pythagorus E. Holcomb, of Ohio, assumed command of the battery in Sayles' stead, but was promoted to major in the 1st Texas Cavalry in August 1863. He was replaced by John W. Chase, for whom the battery is named.

Original members mustered out on September 20, 1864, and recruits were reorganized as the 1st Company Heavy Artillery, Vermont Volunteers, on March 1, 1865. The battery mustered out of serve on July 31, 1865. The battery was engaged at Plain's Store, Louisiana, May 21, 1863, the Siege of Port Hudson, from May 25 to July 9, 1863, and Jackson, August 3, 1863.

It suffered 1 died of wounds, 47 died of disease, and 1 died in Confederate prisons, at total of 54 deaths. Other losses included 73 honorably discharged, 6 promoted to other organizations, 121 transferred to the Veteran Reserve Corps or other organizations, and 19 who deserted. The battery suffered 7 men wounded, and 12 taken prisoner.

== 3rd Vermont Battery ==
The 3rd Battery mustered into United States service on January 1, 1864, with 151 men, and gained 105 recruits during its career. The battery was mustered out of service on June 15, 1865. The battery's only captain, was Romeo H. Start, of St. Albans.

The battery was engaged at Petersburg Mine, on July 30, 1864, and Petersburg on August 18, 1864, March 25, 1865, and April 2, 1865, when it fired the signal round that started the attack on Confederate positions, with the 1st Vermont Brigade in the van.

It suffered 21 died of disease. Other losses included 8 honorably discharged, 1 promoted to other organizations, 1 transferred to the Veteran Reserve Corps or other organizations, and 5 who deserted. The battery suffered 3 men wounded.

== 1st Company, Heavy Artillery ==
The company was organized on March 1, 1865, as mentioned above, from 118 recruits of the 2nd Vermont Battery. It mustered out of service on July 28, 1865. It did not participate in any engagements. The company suffered 4 men who died of disease, 1 who committed suicide, 7 who were discharged for disability, and 1 who deserted.

== 1st Heavy Artillery, 11th Vermont Volunteers ==
See the separate article on the 11th Vermont Infantry.

== See also ==
- List of Vermont Civil War units
