= Yellow Bayou, Arkansas =

- Unincorporated community
- Location within Arkansas Location within the United States
- Coordinates: 33°24′29″N 91°15′14″W
- Country: United States
- State: Arkansas
- County: Chicot
- Elevation: 128 ft (39 m)
- Time zone: UTC-6 (Central (CST))
  - Summer (DST): UTC-5 (CDT)
- Area code: 870
- GNIS feature ID: 58926

Yellow Bayou is an unincorporated community in Chicot County, Arkansas, United States. Yellow Bayou is located on the west bank of Connerly Bayou, 5.5 miles (8.9 km) north-northeast of Lake Village.
