= List of Vermont units in the American Civil War =

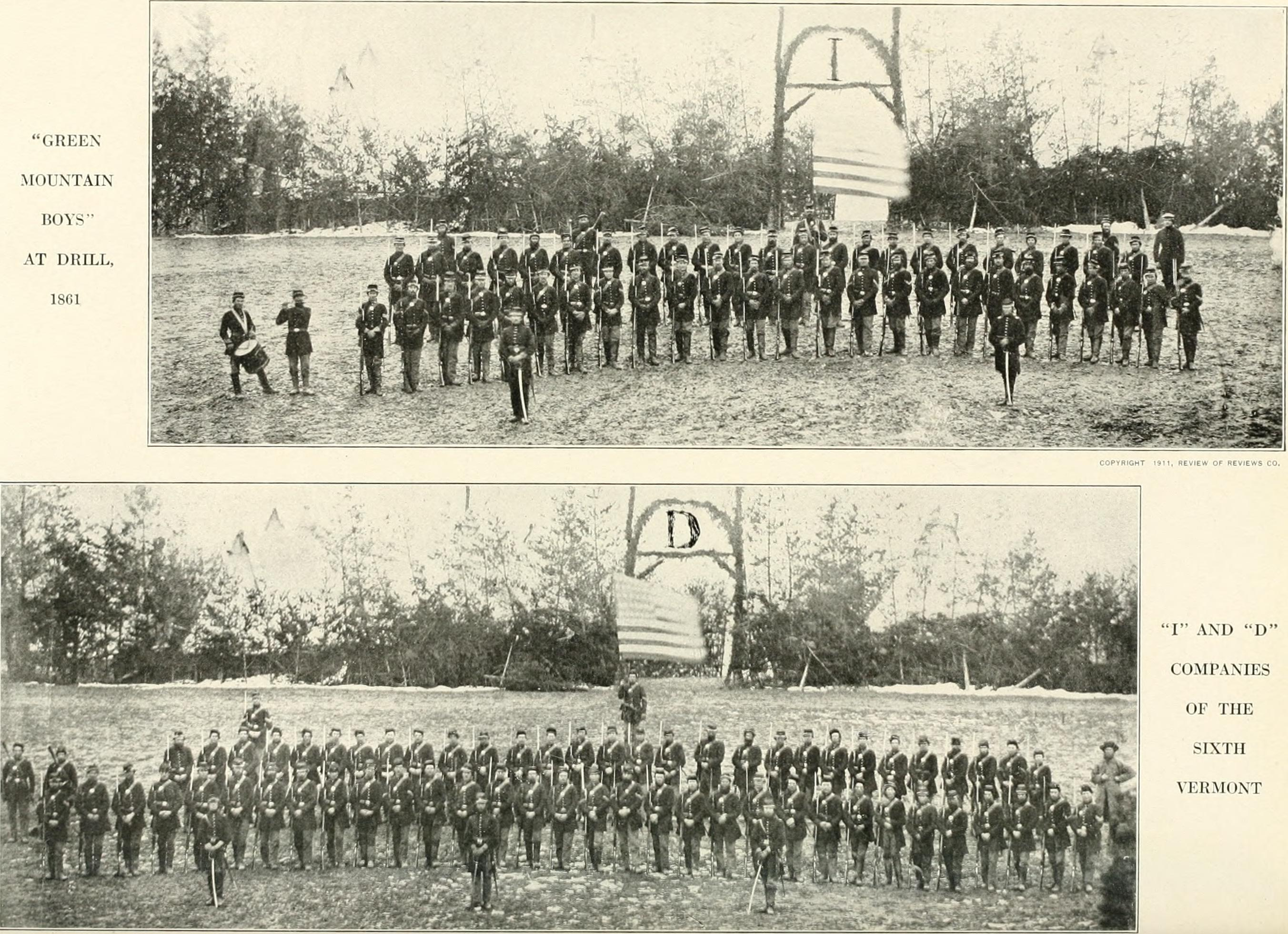
Two Vermont units pictured during the Civil War in 1861

List of military units raised by the state of Vermont during the American Civil War.

== Artillery ==
- 1st Vermont Heavy Artillery Regiment (11th Infantry)
- 1st Company, Vermont Heavy Artillery

- 1st Battery Vermont Light Artillery (Hebard's)
- 2nd Battery Vermont Light Artillery (Chase's)
- 3rd Battery Vermont Light Artillery (Start's)

== Cavalry ==
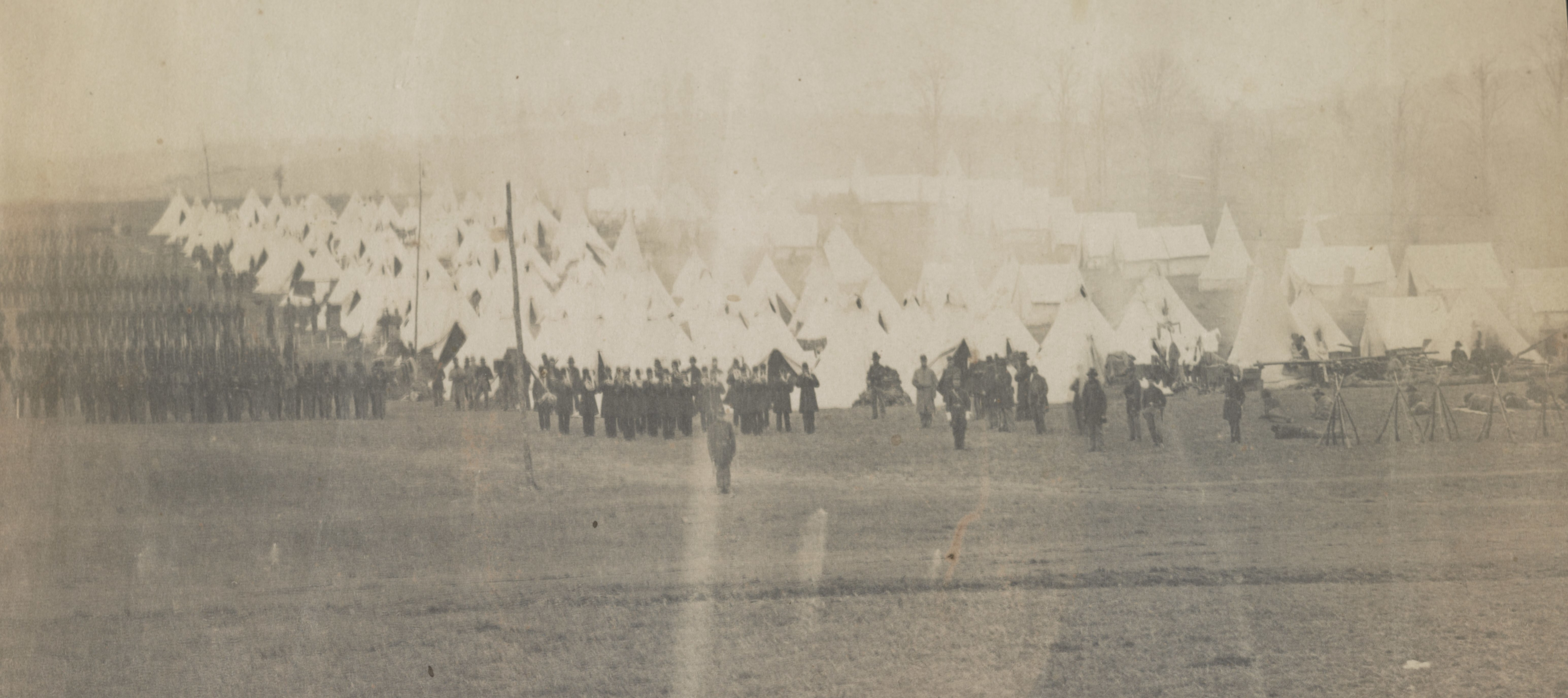
The 4th Vermont Infantry Regiment at Camp Griffin in Virginia in 1861

- 1st Vermont Volunteer Cavalry Regiment
- Frontier Cavalry (26th New York Cavalry)

== Infantry ==
- 1st Vermont Volunteer Infantry Regiment
- 2nd Vermont Volunteer Infantry Regiment
- 3rd Vermont Volunteer Infantry Regiment
- 4th Vermont Volunteer Infantry Regiment
- 5th Vermont Volunteer Infantry Regiment
- 6th Vermont Volunteer Infantry Regiment
- 7th Vermont Volunteer Infantry Regiment
- 8th Vermont Volunteer Infantry Regiment
- 9th Vermont Volunteer Infantry Regiment

- 10th Vermont Volunteer Infantry Regiment
- 12th Vermont Volunteer Infantry Regiment
- 13th Vermont Volunteer Infantry Regiment
- 14th Vermont Volunteer Infantry Regiment
- 15th Vermont Volunteer Infantry Regiment
- 16th Vermont Volunteer Infantry Regiment
- 17th Vermont Volunteer Infantry Regiment
- 18th Vermont Volunteer Infantry Regiment

== Brigades ==
- 1st Vermont Brigade
- 2nd Vermont Brigade

== See also ==
- Vermont in the American Civil War
- Lists of American Civil War Regiments by State
