= Chester Village Historic District =

Historic district in Vermont, United States

- U.S. National Register of Historic Places
- U.S. Historic district
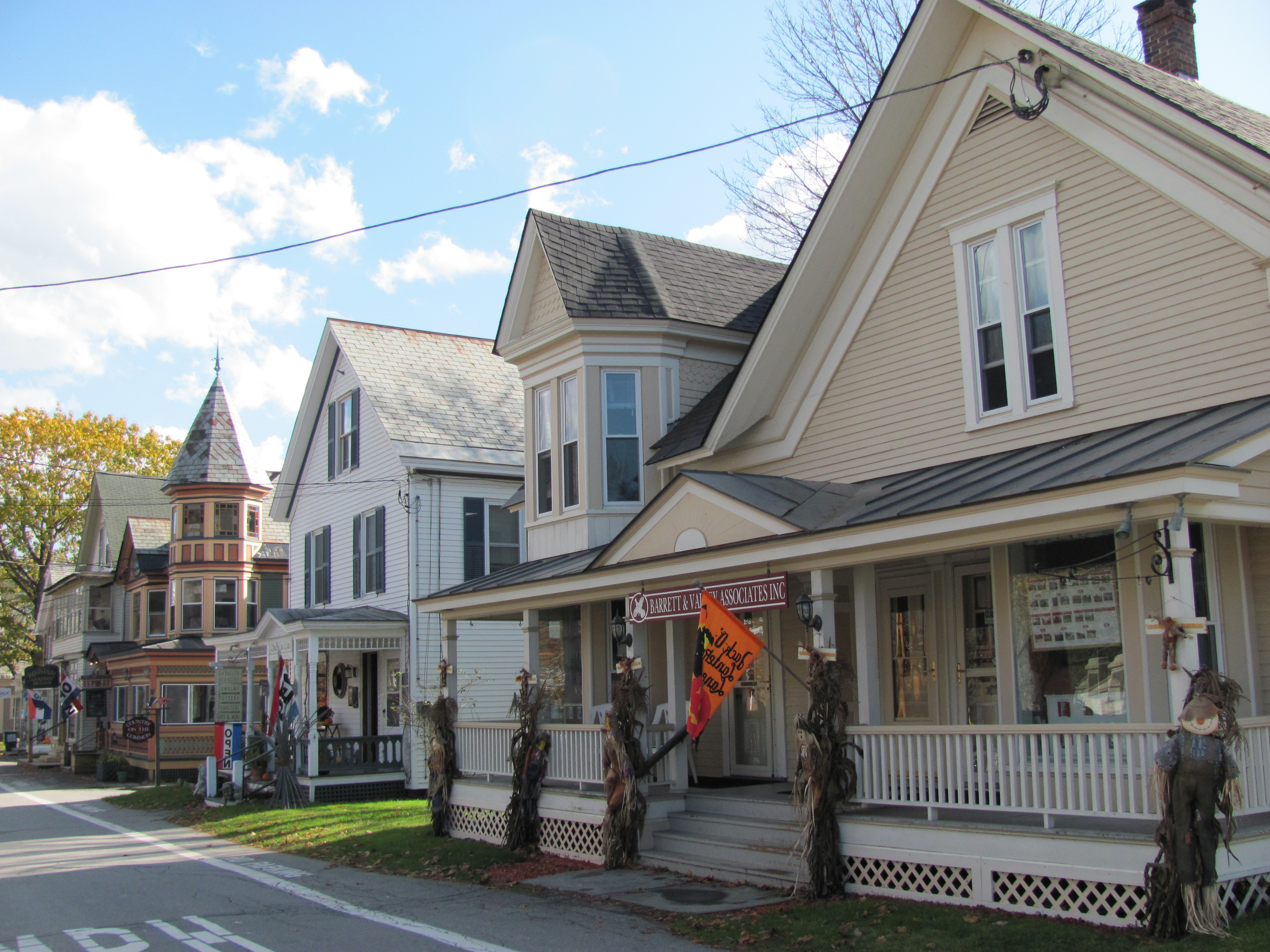
- West side of village green

- Location within Vermont Location within the United States
- Location: Roughly bounded by Lovers Lane Brook, Maple St., Williams River, Middle Branch & Lovers Lane, Chester, Vermont
- Coordinates: 43°15′54″N 72°36′4″W
- Area: 147 acres (59 ha)
- Architectural style: Colonial Revival, Late Victorian, Federal
- NRHP reference No.: 85001739
- Added to NRHP: August 8, 1985

The Chester Village Historic District encompasses the historic southern portion of the main village of Chester, Vermont, US. Essentially a linear stretch of Main Street (Vermont Route 11), this area includes some of the village's oldest (late 18th century) buildings and has an architectural history spanning into the early 20th century. The district was listed on the National Register of Historic Places in 1985.

== Description and history ==
The layout of Chester's central village was born in a religious controversy in 1785. Baptists and Congregationalists disagreed over the placement of their respective houses of worship, with the dispute being resolved by the Congregationalists taking the North parish (now the northern part of the village) and the Baptists the South parish (the subject of this district). The Baptists built their first meetinghouse (still standing) in 1785, eventually moving to a larger building (also standing) in 1835. The area benefited economically from its presence on a stagecoach route, and from industry along the Williams River. The construction of the railroad between the two villages resulted in their eventual combination into a larger extended village.

The historic district encompassing the original South parish extends along Main Street, from a point just northwest of Lover's Lane to Maple Street, and extends for short distances along adjacent roads. Most of the buildings in the district are modestly scaled wood-frame structures, built in the mid-19th century, during the village's period of greatest economic prosperity. Notable exceptions include the brick Chester Academy building (1814; enlarged 1830), two Federal style brick houses built in the 1820s, and a brick commercial block, also from the Federal period.

== See also ==
- National Register of Historic Places listings in Windsor County, Vermont
