= Edwin Stoughton =

Edwin Stoughton may refer to:

- Edwin H. Stoughton (1838–1868), American Civil War general and lawyer
- Edwin W. Stoughton (1818–1882), American lawyer and ambassador
