= 4th Vermont Infantry Regiment =

- Flag of Vermont, 1837–1923
- Active: September 21, 1861 to July 13, 1865
- Disbanded: July 13, 1865
- Allegiance: (United States) United States; Union
- Branch: United States Army; Union Army
- Type: Infantry
- Size: 1,658
- Engagements: Battle of Williamsburg; Battle of Savage's Station; Battle of Antietam; Battle of Fredericksburg; Battle of Chancellorsville; Second Battle of Fredericksburg; Battle of Salem Church; Battle of Gettysburg; Battle of the Wilderness; Battle of Spotsylvania Court House; Battle of Cold Harbor; Siege of Petersburg

Commanders
- Colonel: Edwin H. Stoughton
- Colonel: Charles B. Stoughton
- Colonel: George P. Foster

Insignia
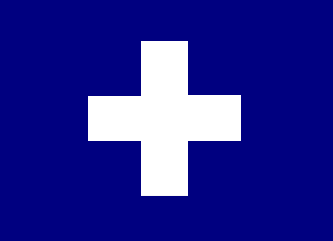
- 2nd Brigade (Vermont Brigade), 2nd Division, VI Corps (Union Army), Army of the Potomac/Army of the Shenandoah (Union)

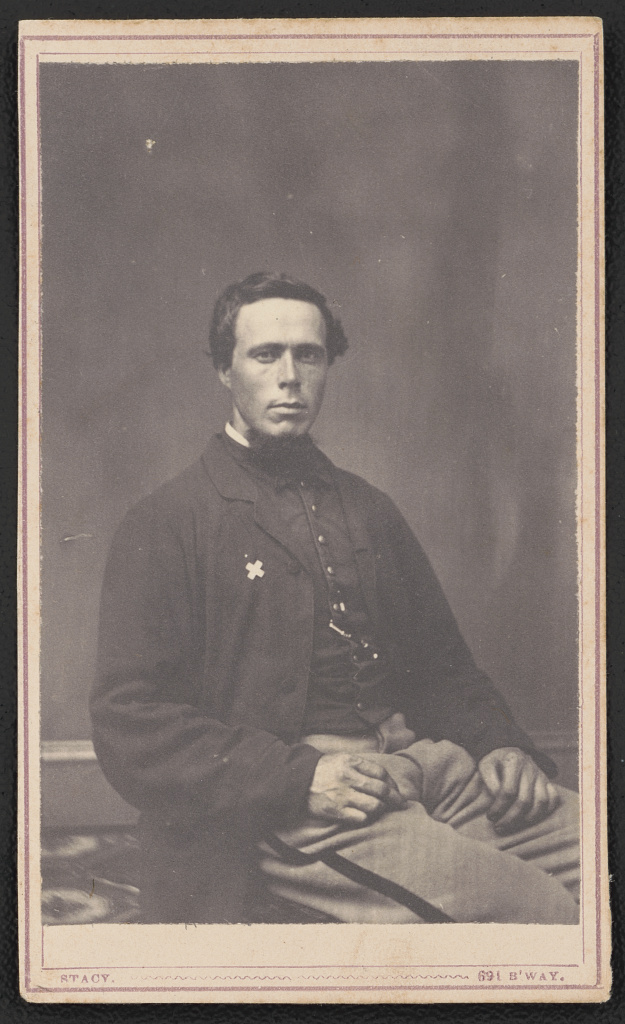
Sergeant William Cunningham of Co. D, 4th Vermont Infantry Regiment. From the Liljenquist Family Collection of Civil War Photographs, Prints and Photographs Division, Library of Congress

The 4th Vermont Infantry Regiment was a three year' infantry regiment in the Union Army during the American Civil War. It served in the Eastern Theater, predominantly in the VI Corps, Army of the Potomac, from September 1861 to July 1865. It was a member of the Vermont Brigade.

== History ==
In July 1861, Congress authorized President Abraham Lincoln to call out 500,000 men, to serve for three years unless sooner discharged. The 4th Vermont Infantry was the third of the three years regiments from the state placed in the field as a result of this call, and organized simultaneously with the 5th Vermont Infantry. Nine of its ten companies were recruited from the east side of the state, an important cultural division at the time.

Governor Erastus Fairbanks' first choice to command the regiment was Lt. Col. Peter T. Washburn, who had served with the 1st Vermont Infantry, but he declined; in October 1861, Washburn was appointed adjutant general of the Vermont Militia. Fairbanks' second choice was 2nd Lt. Edwin H. Stoughton, U.S. Army, an 1859 graduate of the United States Military Academy in the 6th U.S. Infantry. He was a native of Bellows Falls. Maj. Harry Niles Worthen of Thetford, late of the 1st Vermont Infantry, was selected lieutenant colonel. John C. Tyler of Brattleboro became major, and Charles B. Stoughton, Edwin's younger brother, became adjutant.

The regiment rendezvoused at Brattleboro by September 14 on the grounds of what is now Brattleboro Union High School. The camp was named "Camp Holbrook," in honor of Governor Frederick Holbrook, of Brattleboro, who had just been elected. On September 21, the regiment, 1048 men strong, was mustered into Federal service, left that evening and arrived in Washington, D.C. the evening of September 23, and went into camp on Capitol Hill. Four days later, the regiment marched to the Chain Bridge, where it joined the 2nd, 3rd and 5th regiments.

On October 9, the Vermont regiments moved to Camp Griffin, about four miles from Chain Bridge. Here, on October 24, the 6th Vermont Infantry arrived, completing the initial organization of the "Old Vermont Brigade."

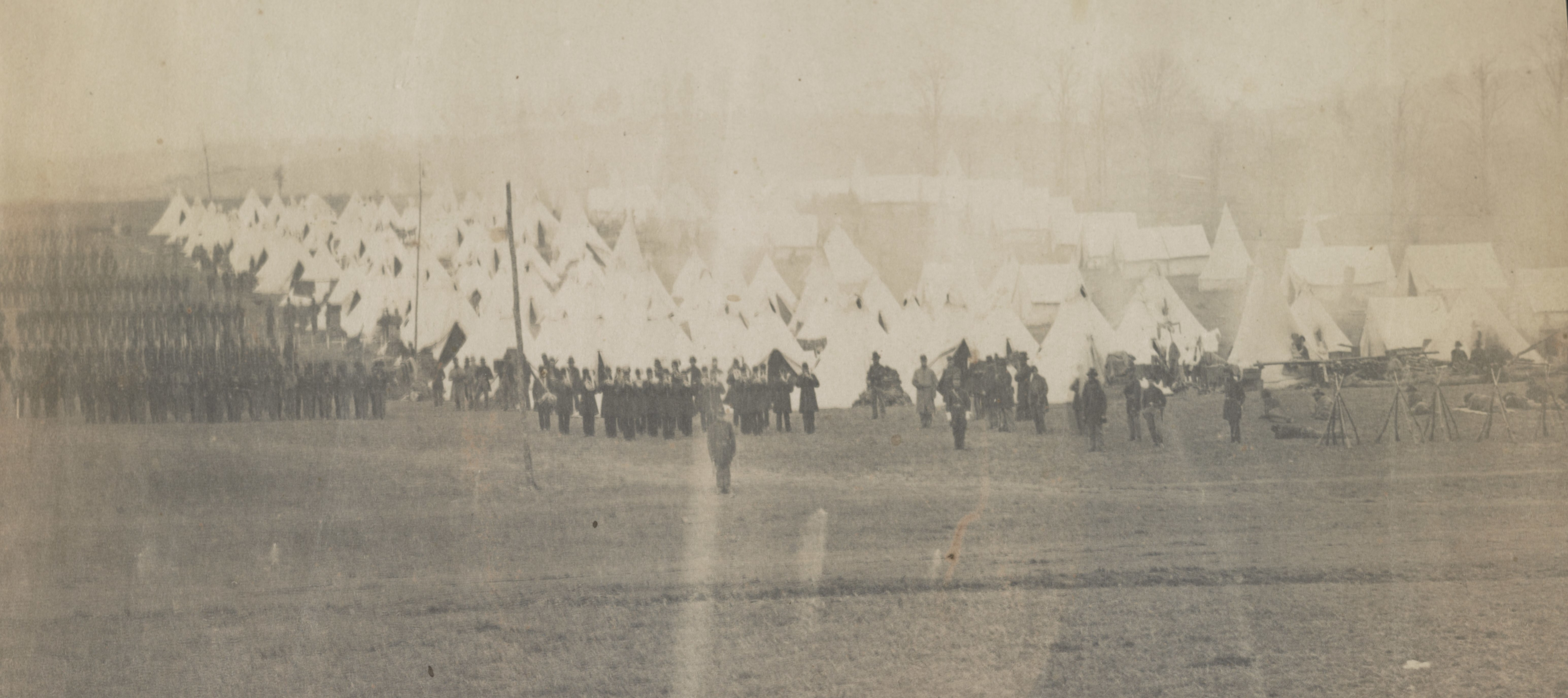
4th Vermont Infantry Regiment at Camp Griffin, Langley, Virginia, 1861

The history of the regiment from this point on is essentially that of the Vermont Brigade, except for several senior personnel changes. Lieutenant Colonel Worthen and Major Tyler resigned on January 17, 1862. Adjutant Stoughton became lieutenant colonel, and George P. Foster, Captain, Co. G, was promoted to major. Colonel Stoughton was promoted to brigadier general on November 5, 1862; Charles Stoughton became Colonel, Major Foster lieutenant colonel, and Stephen M. Pingree, originally 1st lieutenant, Co. E, became major. After Charles Stoughton was discharged for wounds, Foster became the final commander of the regiment, and Pingree was promoted to lieutenant colonel. Both Charles Stoughton and George Foster would later be brevetted brigadier general for their gallant and meritorious service.

One June 23, 1864, the regiment "suffered the greatest loss of men by capture" it ever experienced. It was engaged with the brigade and the Sixth Corps in a movement against the Weldon Railroad, and was thrown out in front under command of Major Pratt, with a battalion of the eleventh. The enemy broke through the line with a strong force, and surrounded and captured seven officers and 137 men of the Fourth, as well as almost the entire battalion of the Eleventh. The colors of the Fourth were saved by the activity and coolness of the color guard. The officers so captured were Major Pratt, Captains Chapin and Boutin, and Lieutenants Carr, Fisher, Needham and Pierce. Among the killed was Captain William C. Tracy, of Co. G. His dead body was found on the field next day, stripped of arms, watch, money and boots, and surrounded by the muskets of his men, showing that he had rallied his company around him, and that they threw down their arms only when their gallant leader had fallen."

The original members of the regiment, who did not reenlist, were mustered out of the service on September 30, 1864. The First, Second and Third Companies of Sharpshooters transferred to the regiment on February 25, 1865, and the regiment was consolidated into eight companies. One year recruits and others whose term of service was due to expire prior to October 1, 1865, were mustered out on June 19, 1865. The remaining officers and men mustered out of service on July 13.

== Medal of Honor ==
Five members of the regiment were awarded the Medal of Honor.

- Coffey, Robert J., Sergeant, Co. K, "single-handedly captured 2 officers and 5 privates of the 8th Louisiana Regiment (C.S.A.)," at the Battle of Salem Church on May 4, 1863.
- Drury, James, Sergeant, Co. C, "saved the colors of his regiment when it was surrounded by a much larger force of the enemy and after the greater part of the regiment had been killed or captured," at Weldon Railroad, on July 23, 1864
- Hooker, George W., 1st lieutenant, Co. E, "rode alone, in advance of his regiment, into the enemy's lines, and before his own men came up received the surrender of the major of a Confederate regiment, together with the colors and 116 men," at the Battle of South Mountain on September 14, 1862.
- Rich, Carlos H., 1st sergeant, Co. K, "saved the life of an officer," at the Battle of the Wilderness on May 5, 1864.
- Wheeler, Daniel D., 1st lieutenant, Co. G, exhibited "distinguished bravery in action where he was wounded and had a horse shot from under him," at the Battle of Salem Church, on May 3, 1863.

== Engagements ==
ENGAGEMENTS
Battle of Lewinsville	September 11, 1861
Battle at Lee's Mills	April 16, 1862
Battle of Williamsburg	May 5, 1862
Battle of Garnett's & Golding's Farm	June 26, 1862
Battle of Savage's Station	June 29, 1862
Battle of White Oak Swamp	June 30, 1862
Battle of Crampton's Gap	September 14, 1862
Battle of Antietam	September 17, 1862
Battle of Fredericksburg	December 13, 1862
Battle of Marye's Heights	May 3, 1863
Battle of Salem Church	May 4, 1863
Second Battle of Fredericksburg	June 5, 1863
Battle of Gettysburg	July 3, 1863
Battle of Funkstown	July 10, 1863
Second Battle of Rappahannock Station	November 7, 1863
Battle of the Wilderness	May 5–10, 1864
Battle of Spotsylvania	May 10–18, 1864
Battle of Cold Harbor	June 1–12, 1864
Second Battle of Petersburg	June 18, 1864
Battle of Reams' Station	June 29, 1864
Fort Stevens (Washington, D.C.)	July 11, 1864
Battle of Charlestown	August 21, 1864
Battle of Opequon (Gilbert's Ford)	September 13, 1864
Battle of Winchester (Opequon)	September 19, 1864
Battle of Fisher's Hill	September 21–22, 1864
Battle of Cedar Creek	October 19, 1864
Siege of Petersburg	March 25, 1865
Third Battle of Petersburg	April 2, 1865

== Final Statement ==
FINAL STATEMENT
Original members	1048
Gain (recruits and transferes)	642
--- Aggregate	1690
--- Losses ---
Killed in action	86
Died of wounds	73
Died of disease	201
Died in Confederate prisons	61
Died from accident	2
Total of Deaths	423
Promoted to other regiments	8
Honorably discharged	468
Dishonorably discharged	6
Deserted	111
Finally unaccounted for	5
Transferred to Veteran Reserve Corps and other organizations	86
--- Total Losses	684
Mustered out at various times	583
Total wounded	418
Total taken prisoner	199

== See also ==
- Vermont in the Civil War
- Vermont Brigade
