= Jeffrey House =

Historic house in Vermont, United States

- U.S. National Register of Historic Places
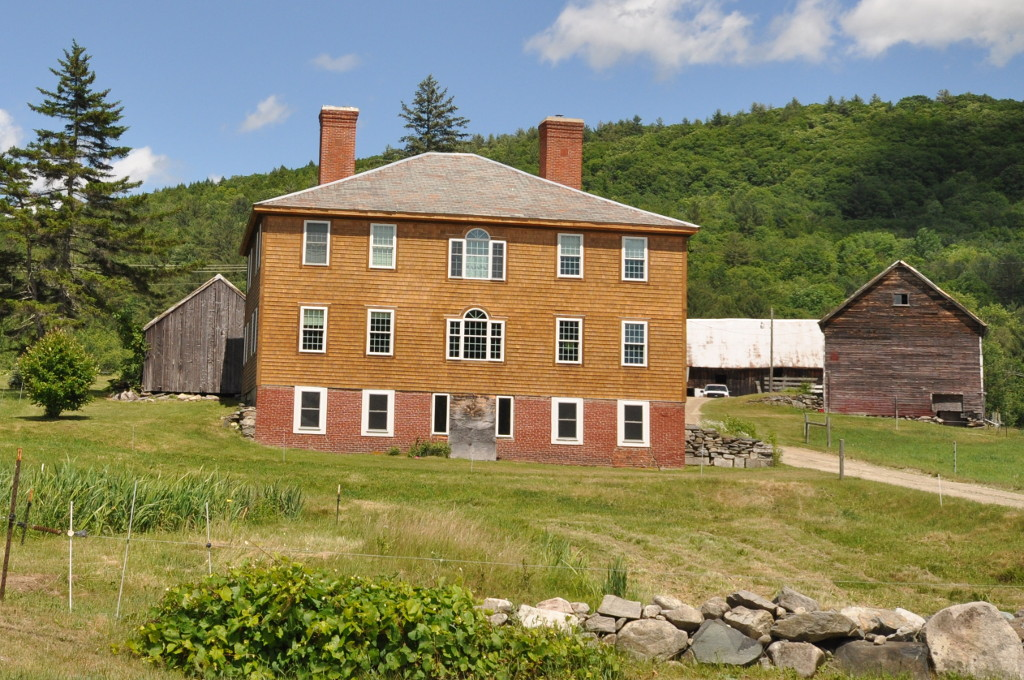

- Location within Vermont
- Location: North St., Chester, Vermont
- Coordinates: 43°16′44″N 72°35′51″W
- Area: less than one acre
- Built: 1797
- Built by: Sargent, Jabez, Jr.
- Architectural style: Georgian
- NRHP reference No.: 74000271
- Added to NRHP: June 13, 1974

The Jeffrey House is a historic house on North Street in Chester, Vermont United States. Built in 1797, it is one of Vermont's small number of surviving Georgian style houses. It was built by the son of one of the area's early settlers, and originally served as a tavern. It was listed on the National Register of Historic Places in 1974.

== Description and history ==
The Jeffrey House stands just north of Chester's Stone Village, set back about 200 feet (61 m) from the east side of Vermont Route 103. It is a two-story wood-frame structure, with a hip roof and wooden shingle siding. It is set in the side of a shallow hill, and its basement, partly rubblestone but finished on the west side in brick, is entirely exposed on the front facade. It is covered by a hip roof, with two interior chimneys. The front facade is five bays wide, with a former entrance at the center of the basement level (now boarded over) flanked by sidelights. Windows in the outer bays are sash, with simple surrounds, while the windows above the entrance are Palladian three-part windows with rounded centers. The interior follows a typical Georgian central hall pattern, with a center hall flanked by two rooms on each side on the ground floor. It varies from the pattern with a large ballroom extending in front of the chimneys on the second floor.

The house was built in 1797 by Jabez Sargent Jr., whose father was one of Chester's first settlers. Chester was incorporated as New Flamsted in 1763, and was in 1766 designated the county seat of Cumberland County, New York (Vermont then being disputed territory between the Province of New York and the Province of New Hampshire). Local oral tradition holds that the house is built on the site of the county's first courthouse and jail. The house originally served as a tavern, situated on one of the major routes between Boston and Montreal. It is one of Vermont's few Georgian buildings, a style that was at the time of its construction already fading in fashion. Although it is built to a large size (befitting its use as a tavern), it lacks many of the high-style features often found in large Georgian houses.

== See also ==
- National Register of Historic Places listings in Windsor County, Vermont
