= Edwin H. Stoughton =

Union Army general

Edwin Henry Stoughton
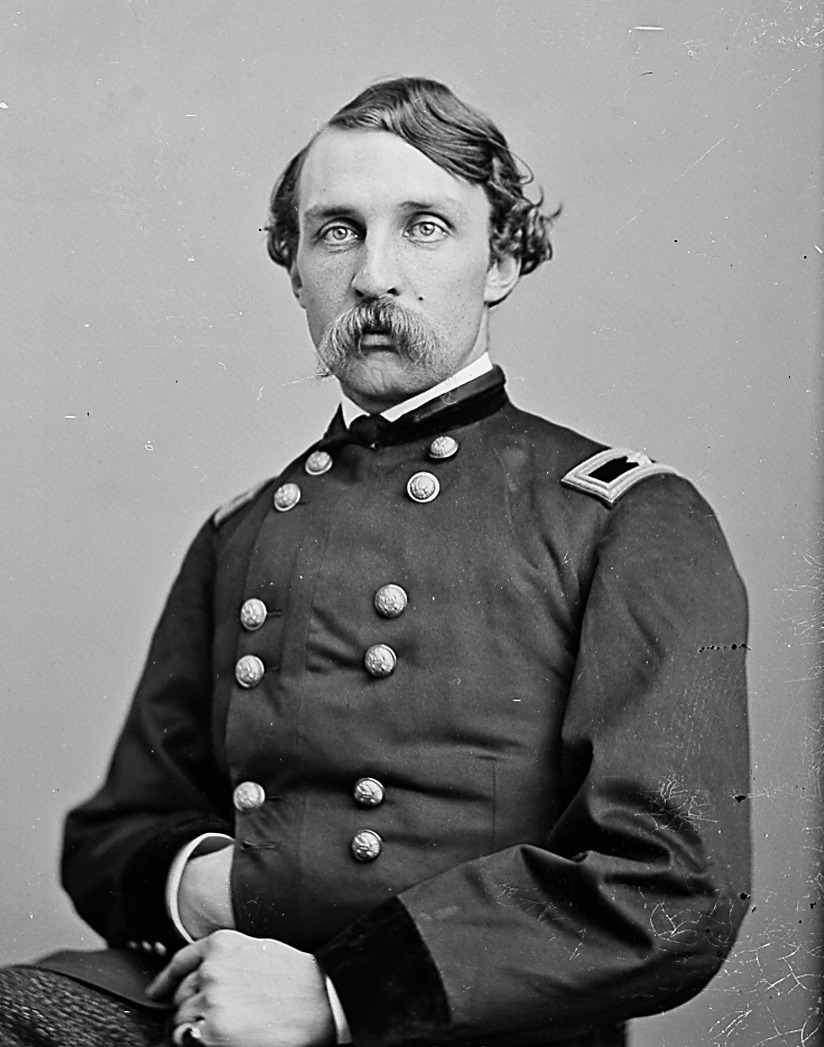
- Born: June 23, 1838; Chester, Vermont
- Died: December 25, 1868 (aged 30); Dorchester, Massachusetts
- Burial place: Immanuel Cemetery, Bellows Falls, Vermont
- Military career
- Allegiance: United States of America; Union
- Branch: United States Army; Union Army
- Service years: 1859–1863
- Rank: Brigadier general (appointed, not confirmed)
- Commands: 4th Vermont Infantry; 2nd Vermont Brigade
- Conflicts: American Civil War: Peninsula Campaign
- Other work: Attorney

Edwin Henry Stoughton (June 23, 1838 – December 25, 1868) was appointed a brigadier general in the Union Army during the American Civil War, but his appointment expired after it was not confirmed by the U.S. Senate. Four days later, on March 8, 1863, he was captured by Confederate partisan ranger John S. Mosby while asleep at his headquarters in the Virginia village of Fairfax Court House. The incident became well known, and Stoughton became an object of ridicule as a result. He was included in a prisoner exchange two months later but resigned his commission after he was not reappointed as a brigadier general.

== Early life and education ==
Stoughton was born in Chester, Vermont, the son of Henry Evander and Laura (Clark) Stoughton.

Stoughton was appointed a cadet at the U.S. Military Academy on July 1, 1854, and graduated with the class of 1859. He served garrison duty as a brevet second lieutenant in the 4th U.S. Infantry from July to September 1859. He was promoted to second lieutenant and transferred to the 6th U.S. Infantry.

== Career ==
=== American Civil War ===
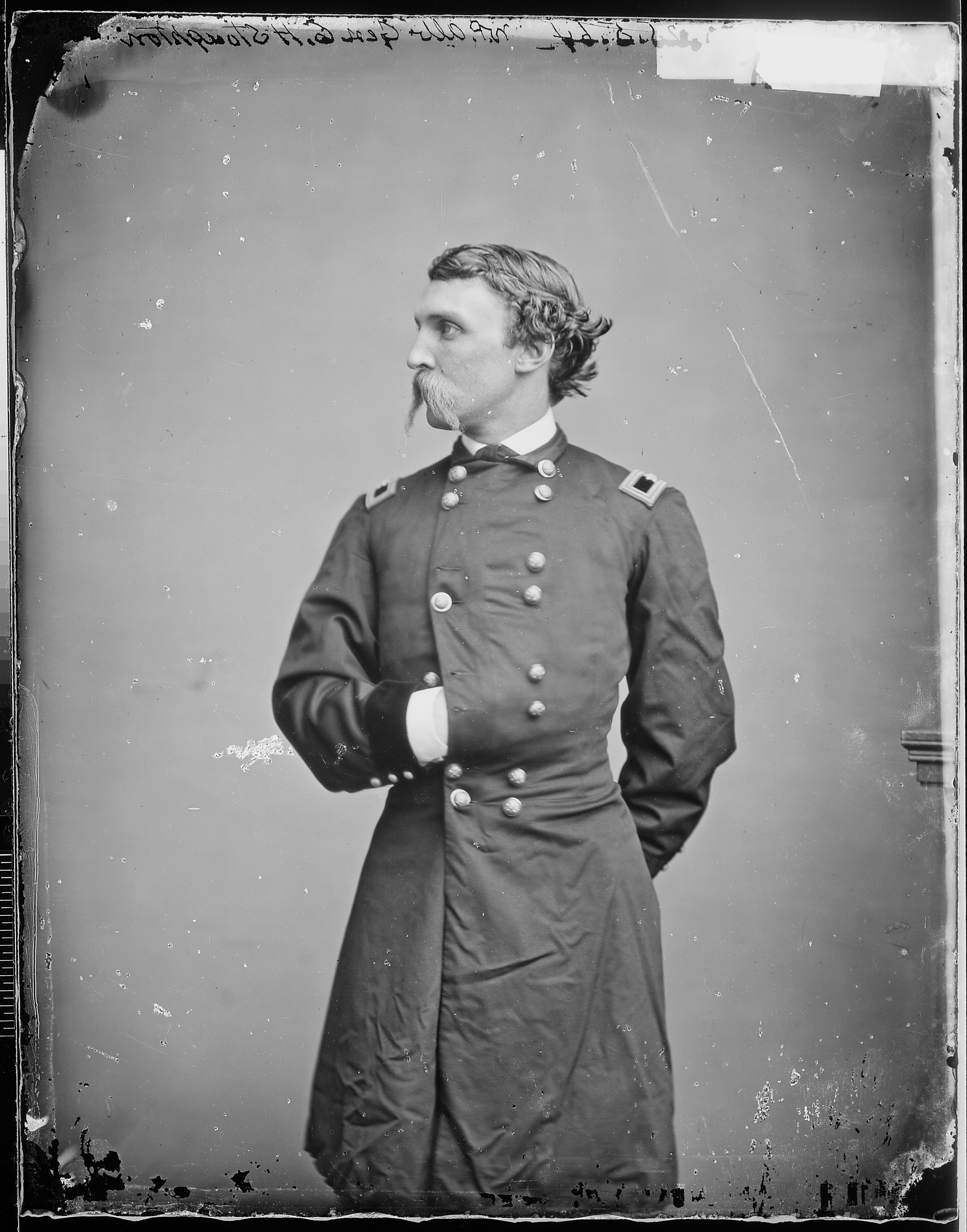
Stoughton during the Civil War

Stoughton resigned his regular commission in March 1861 and in September was appointed commander of the 4th Vermont Infantry with the rank of colonel. He was only 23 at the time of his appointment and was said to be the youngest colonel in the army. He led his command in the Peninsula Campaign, and his effective performance led to his selection for promotion and command of a brigade.

In November 1862, he was appointed brigadier general of Volunteers, and he assumed command of the 2nd Vermont Brigade on December 7, replacing Colonel Asa P. Blunt. Stoughton's brother, Charles B. Stoughton, assumed command of the 4th Vermont Infantry in his stead. Stoughton's appointment was never confirmed by the U.S. Senate, and it expired March 4, 1863, less than a week before Mosby's Fairfax Court House Raid.

Mosby's Rangers (led by Confederate officer John S. Mosby) led a daring raid into Union Territory and captured Stoughton at Fairfax Court House on March 9, 1863. Stoughton had hosted a party for his visiting mother and sister, who were staying at the home of Confederate spy Antonia Ford. After leaving the party, Stoughton retired to a nearby house that served as his headquarters. Mosby allegedly found Stoughton in bed, supposedly rousing him with a slap to his rear. Upon being so rudely awakened, the general shouted, "Do you know who I am?" Mosby quickly replied, "Do you know Mosby, general?" "Yes! Have you got the rascal?" "No but he has got you!" In his own written account of Stoughton's capture, which appeared in Volume III of 1888's Battles and Leaders of the Civil War, Mosby did not mention the supposed "spanking" incident. It is however mentioned in Mosby's Memoirs.

Allegedly, Stoughton was not popular with the officers and men of the brigade, and few mourned his loss. U.S. President Lincoln, on hearing of the capture, said that "he did not so much mind the loss of a brigadier general, for he could make another in five minutes; 'but those horses cost $125 apiece!'" Blunt resumed command and led the brigade until he turned command over to Brigadier General George J. Stannard on April 20. Stannard led the brigade until the Battle of Gettysburg.

After a two-month stay in Richmond's Libby Prison, Stoughton was exchanged, but saw no further service. The U.S. Senate had not confirmed his initial appointment, and he was not re-appointed. He resigned from the Union Army in May 1863 and moved to New York.

== Later life and death ==
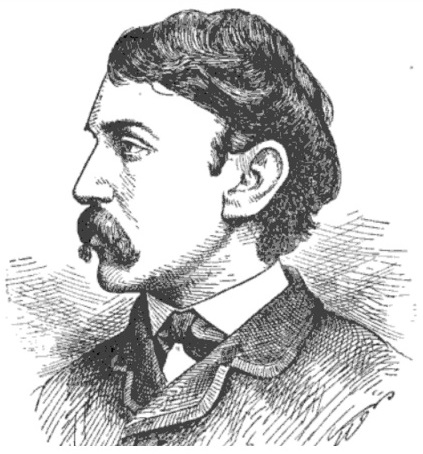
Stoughton as depicted in 1911's Prison Life in the Old Capitol and Reminiscences of the Civil War.

Stoughton was an attorney in New York City after the war, practicing with his father and with his uncle, Edwin W. Stoughton. In November 1864, Confederate spies calling themselves the Confederate Army of Manhattan attempted to set fire to New York City. Most escaped, but Stoughton's West Point classmate Robert Cobb Kennedy was captured. Stoughton defended him at his trial; Cobb was convicted, and in March 1865, he became the last Confederate soldier to be executed by Union authorities.

Stoughton died of tuberculosis in Dorchester, Massachusetts on December 25, 1868. He was buried at the Immanuel Cemetery at the Immanuel Episcopal Church in Bellows Falls, Vermont. The Grand Army of the Republic post in Bellows Falls was named for him.

== See also ==
- List of American Civil War generals (Union)
- Vermont in the American Civil War
