= Henry E. Stoughton =

American politician

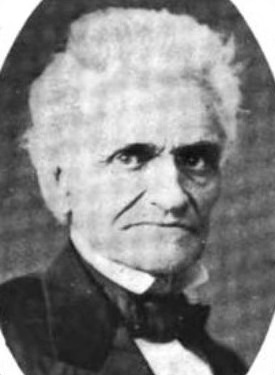

Henry Evander Stoughton (July 23, 1815 – June 19, 1873) was an American attorney and politician who served as President of the Vermont State Senate.

== Biography ==
Henry Evander Stoughton was born in Weathersfield, Vermont on July 23, 1815. He was the son of Thomas Potwine Stoughton and the former Susan Bradley. Crippled as a boy, he worked as a cobbler while studying law, attained admission to the bar in 1841, and practiced first in Chester, and later in Bellows Falls.

A Democrat who advocated preservation of the union in the years preceding the American Civil War, Stoughton served in the Vermont House of Representatives in 1852, and was United States Attorney for the District of Vermont from 1857 to 1860. He was a Delegate to the Democratic national conventions of 1852, 1856 and 1860.

Stoughton subsequently became a Republican over the issues of preservation of the union and abolition of slavery. He served in the Vermont Senate from 1862 to 1864 and was Senate President from 1863 to 1864.

He later relocated to New York City, where he practiced law in partnership with his brother Edwin.

Stoughton died in New York City on June 19, 1873. He was buried at Immanuel Cemetery in Bellows Falls.

== Family ==
Henry E. Stoughton was the father of Edwin Henry Stoughton and Charles Bradley Stoughton. He was the brother of Edwin Wallace Stoughton.

Political offices
Preceded by George F. Edmunds	President pro tempore of the Vermont State Senate; 1863 – 1864	Succeeded by Leverett B. Englesby
Preceded by Lucius B. Peck	United States Attorney for the District of Vermont; 1857 – 1860	Succeeded by George Howe
