= Clarence Adams =

Clarence Adams may refer to:

- Clarence Adams (boxer) (born 1974), American boxer
- Clarence Adams (criminal) (1857–1904), American politician and serial burglar
- Clarence Adams (Korean War) (1930–1999), African-American GI during the Korean War
- Clarence H. Adams (1905–1987), American government official and businessman
- Clarence Raymond Adams (1898–1965), American mathematician
