= Charles B. Stoughton =

American military officer and attorney from Vermont

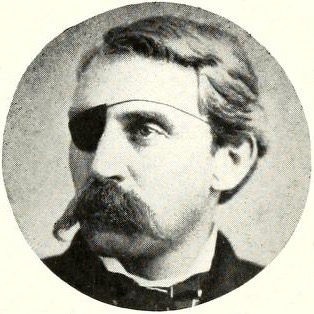
- Stoughton as depicted in 1907's History of the Town of Rockingham, Vermont
- Born: October 31, 1841; Chester, Vermont, U.S.
- Died: January 17, 1898 (aged 56); Bennington, Vermont
- Burial place: Immanuel Cemetery, Bellows Falls, Vermont
- Education: Norwich University
- Spouse: Ada Ripley Hooper (m. 1869-1898, his death)
- Children: 5
- Relatives: Henry E. Stoughton (father); Edwin H. Stoughton (brother); Edwin W. Stoughton (uncle); Benjamin McLane Spock (grandson)
- Military career
- Allegiance: United States (Union)
- Branch: Union Army
- Service years: 1861-1864
- Rank: Colonel (Union Army); Brigadier General (Brevet)
- Unit: Army of the Potomac
- Commands: 4th Vermont Infantry Regiment
- Conflicts: American Civil War
- Other work: Attorney

Charles Bradley Stoughton (October 31, 1841 – January 17, 1898) was an officer and regimental commander in the Union Army during the American Civil War.

== Early life ==
Charles B. Stoughton was born in Chester, Vermont on October 31, 1841. He was the son of Henry E. Stoughton and Laura (Clark) Stoughton. Stoughton was educated in Bellows Falls, Vermont, graduated from Norwich University in 1861, and delayed plans to study law so he could enlist in the Army.

== Military career ==
He was commissioned adjutant of the 4th Vermont Infantry Regiment on August 1, 1861, with the rank of captain, and mustered into military service on September 21. The 4th Vermont was commanded by his brother, Colonel Edwin H. Stoughton. Charles Stoughton was promoted to major on February 25, 1862. He took part in the action at all the regiment's battles during the Peninsula Campaign.

Stoughton was promoted to lieutenant colonel on July 17, 1862, and saw action at Crampton's Gap, where the regiment captured 121 men and the colors of the 15th Virginia Infantry. He subsequently served at Antietam in September, 1862. When his brother was promoted to brigadier general and assumed command of a brigade in November, 1862, Charles Stoughton took command of the regiment and was promoted to colonel.

Stoughton led the regiment at the Battle of Fredericksburg, on December 13, 1862, where the 4th Vermont suffered 56 casualties. He reported "My colors were completely riddled with canister and musket balls, scarcely hanging together. The top of the staff, upon which is a brass eagle, was shot away by canister, but saved, and brought away."

He continued to lead the regiment during its participation in the battles of Marye's Heights, Salem Church, and Gettysburg. On July 10, 1863, during the Union army's pursuit of the retreating Army of Northern Virginia, Stoughton was severely wounded in an engagement near Funkstown, Maryland, resulting in the loss of his right eye. He resigned on February 2, 1864, as a result of his wounds. In the omnibus promotions that followed the end of the war, he was brevetted a Brigadier General to date from March 13, 1865, in recognition of his faithful and meritorious service.

== Post-war career ==
After the war Stoughton studied law with his father, attained admission to the bar, and became an attorney in the New York City practice of his uncle, Edwin W. Stoughton. He was a trustee of Norwich University from 1871 to 1887, and received an honorary Master of Arts in 1872 and an honorary Doctor of Laws (LL.D.) in 1884.

In his later years, Stoughton practiced law in New Haven, Connecticut, and he lived there after retiring. His health began to decline, and he moved to the Vermont Soldiers Home in Bennington, Vermont, where he died on January 17, 1898. He was buried at the Immanuel Cemetery at the Immanuel Episcopal Church in Bellows Falls, Vermont.

== Family ==
In April, 1869 Stoughton married Ada Ripley Hooper of Boston, Massachusetts. They were the parents of one son and five daughters: Bradley; Laura; Leila; Mildred; and Isabel.

Mildred Stoughton was the wife of Benjamin I. Spock. They were the parents of Dr. Benjamin McLane Spock (1903–1998), a leading pediatrician and peace advocate.

== Sources ==
- Benedict, G. G., Vermont in the Civil War. A History of the part taken by the Vermont Soldiers And Sailors in the War For The Union, 1861-5. Burlington, VT.: The Free Press Association, 1888, i:158, 161, 163–164, 166–167, 353, 394, 414.
- Crockett, Walter Hill, Vermont The Green Mountain State, New York: The Century History Company, Inc., 1921, pp. 541, 575.
- Peck, Theodore S., compiler, Revised Roster of Vermont Volunteers and lists of Vermonters Who Served in the Army and Navy of the United States During the War of the Rebellion, 1861–66, Montpelier, VT.: Press of the Watchman Publishing Co., 1892, pp. 108, 750–751.
