= Leverett B. Englesby =

American politician (1827–1881)

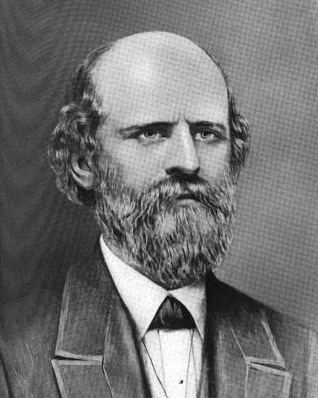

21st President pro tempore of the Vermont Senate
- In office 1864
- Preceded by: Henry E. Stoughton
- Succeeded by: Worthington C. Smith

Personal details
- Born: Leverett Brush Englesby; February 20, 1827 Burlington, Vermont, U.S.
- Died: January 27, 1881 (aged 53) Burlington, Vermont, U.S.
- Party: Republican
- Education: University of Vermont; Harvard University
- Occupation: Politician, lawyer

Leverett Brush Englesby (February 20, 1827 – January 27, 1881) was a Vermont lawyer and politician who served as President of the Vermont State Senate.

Englesby was born in Burlington, Vermont on February 20, 1827. The son of a local bank president, he graduated from the University of Vermont in 1845, studied at Harvard Law School for a year and in a local law office, and became an attorney in Burlington.

From 1853 to 1854 Englesby served as Secretary of Civil and Military Affairs (chief assistant) to Governor John S. Robinson. A Republican, Englesby served in several local offices, including city alderman, assessor, auditor and attorney. In 1866 he was elected a trustee of the University of Vermont, a post he continued to hold until his death. Englesby was President of the 1866 Vermont Republican Convention.

Englesby was an active Mason, and was Grand Master of Vermont from 1862 to 1868.

In 1863, Englesby was elected to the Vermont Senate. He served until 1865, and was Senate President from 1864 to 1865. From 1867 to 1869 he served as Chittenden County State's Attorney.

Englesby died in Burlington on January 27, 1881.

Political offices
| Preceded by Henry E. Stoughton | President pro tempore of the Vermont State Senate; 1864 – 1865 | Succeeded by Worthington C. Smith |
