= Robert Cobb Kennedy =

American Civil War operative (1835–1865)

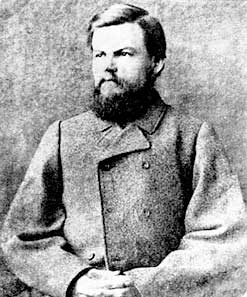
- Born: October 25, 1835; Georgia, U.S
- Died: March 25, 1865 (aged 29); Fort Lafayette, New York, U.S.
- Cause of death: Execution by hanging
- Military career
- Allegiance: Confederate States of America
- Branch: Confederate States Army
- Service years: 1861–1865
- Unit: First Louisiana Regulars
- Conflicts: American Civil War: Battle of Shiloh

Robert Cobb Kennedy (October 25, 1835 – March 25, 1865) was a Confederate operative who was hanged for his role in a failed plot to burn New York City during the American Civil War.

== Early life and family ==
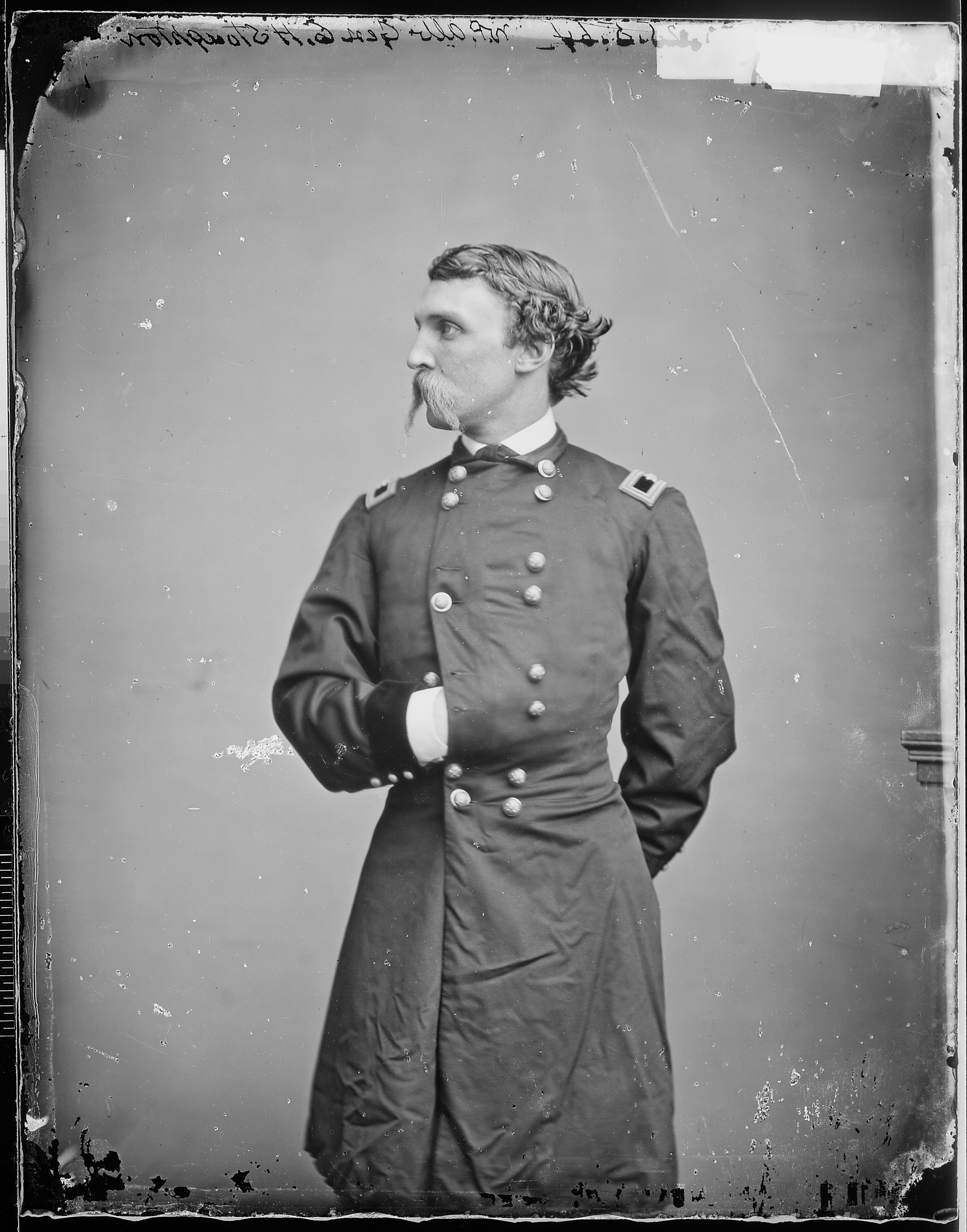
General Edwin Stoughton, Kennedy's classmate and later his defense lawyer

Kennedy was born in Georgia to John Bailey Kennedy, a physician, and his wife Eliza Lydia Cobb. His mother came from a prominent family, and was a distant relative of Howell Cobb, a Speaker of the U.S. House, U.S. Treasury Secretary, and governor of Georgia. He was the oldest of seven children. His family relocated to Alabama shortly after his birth, but due to declining fortunes they moved again to northwest Louisiana in 1846, settling in Claiborne Parish. The family's fortunes improved in Louisiana, where they amassed over 3,000 acres of land as well as dozens of slaves, making them one of the wealthier families of the region.

At the age of 18, Kennedy left home to attend West Point. He entered in the same class as Joseph Wheeler and Edwin H. Stoughton, who would both later serve as generals on opposing sides of the Civil War, but Kennedy proved a poor student. He accumulated numerous demerits and a poor academic record, and was finally thrown out after two years of study when he was caught drunk off-campus with another cadet. After two years of lackluster study, Kennedy returned to Louisiana. He quarreled often with his father and gained a reputation as a heavy drinker.

== Civil War service ==
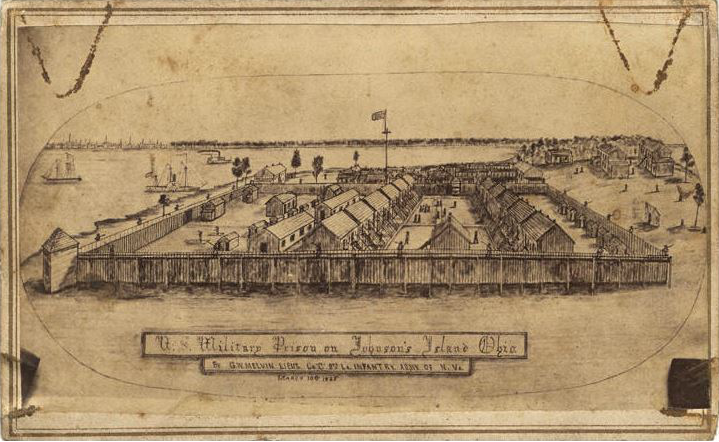
Kennedy was one of a very small number of people to escape from Johnson's Island Prison

When the war began, Kennedy entered Confederate service, joining the First Louisiana Regulars as a lieutenant. He fought at the Battle of Shiloh, receiving a wound that left him with a permanent limp. His abortive term at West Point proved useful to him, as he was able to use a connection to former classmate General Joseph Wheeler to get a position as an assistant. He was captured while carrying dispatches, imprisoned at Johnson's Island, and later escaped using a homemade ladder and skiff. After his escape, he headed to Canada rather than back South; it was there that he was recruited by Confederate spymaster Jacob Thompson, the head of the Confederate Secret Service.

== The plot to burn New York City ==
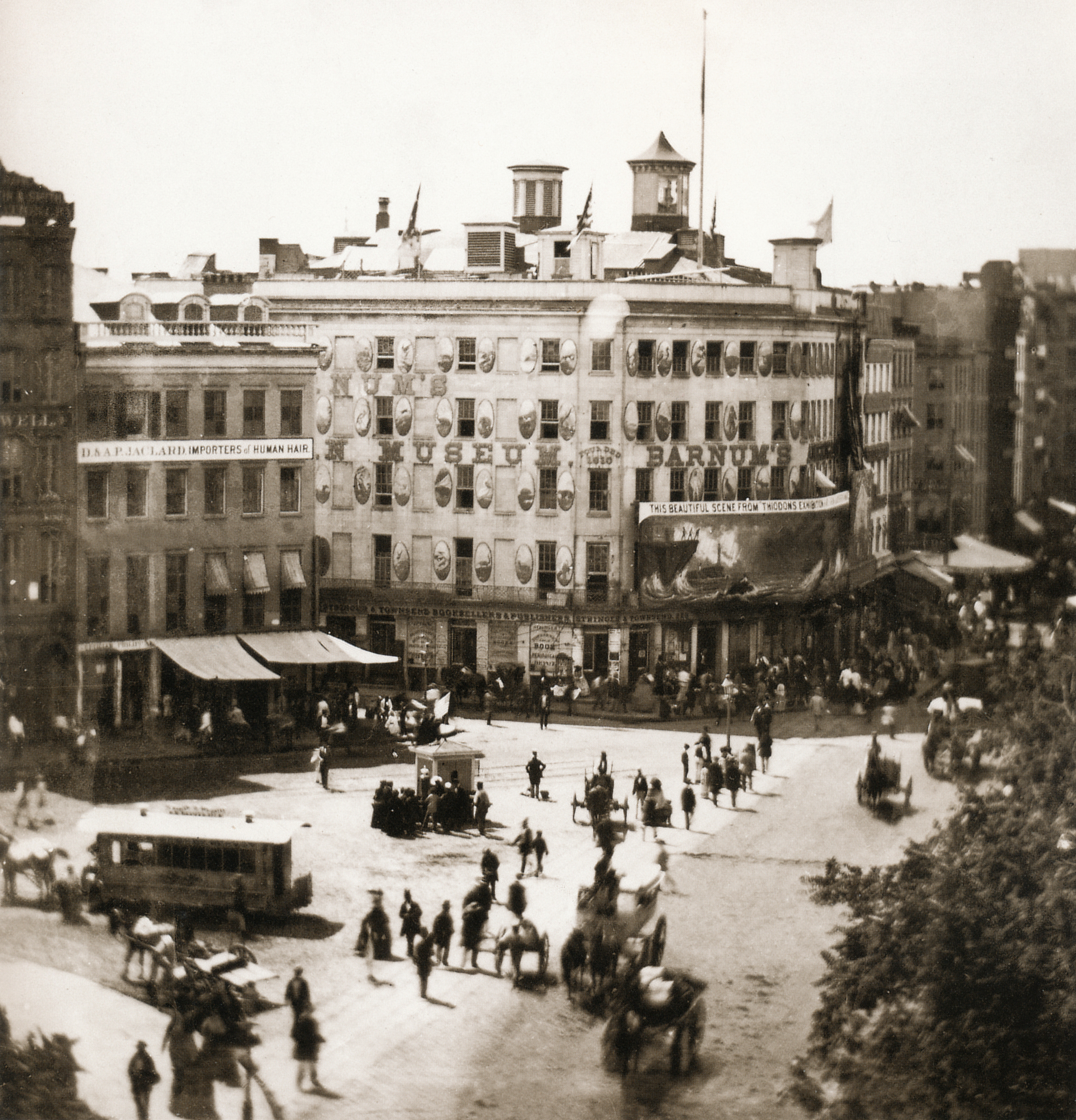
Barnum's American Museum, where Kennedy attempted to start a blaze

In 1864, Kennedy joined a small group of fellow Confederate operatives in a plot to burn New York City in retaliation for General Sheridan's scorched-earth tactics in Virginia. Each of the conspirators was equipped with incendiary devices, with which they planned to start fires in a number of hotels around the city where they had procured rooms. The goal of the plot was to overwhelm the local fire departments, burning much of the city and striking a blow to Union morale. While most of the conspirators proceeded as planned, Kennedy added his own twist, using one of his incendiaries to set a fire at Barnum's American Museum, allegedly because "it would be fun to start a scare." The plot ultimately failed, with the fires being quickly extinguished. The conspirators had failed to open any windows, which restricted airflow. Had they done so, it is likely that the blazes would have burned out of control, as intended.

After the failed attack, Kennedy and his associates fled to Canada, returning briefly to American soil to participate in a failed attempt, led by John Yates Beall, to rescue Confederate prisoners by hijacking the train carrying them and diverting it to Canada. Kennedy then attempted to return to Confederate territory, but was apprehended by federal detectives when his train entered Detroit. He was then transferred back to New York to stand trial.

== Trial and execution ==
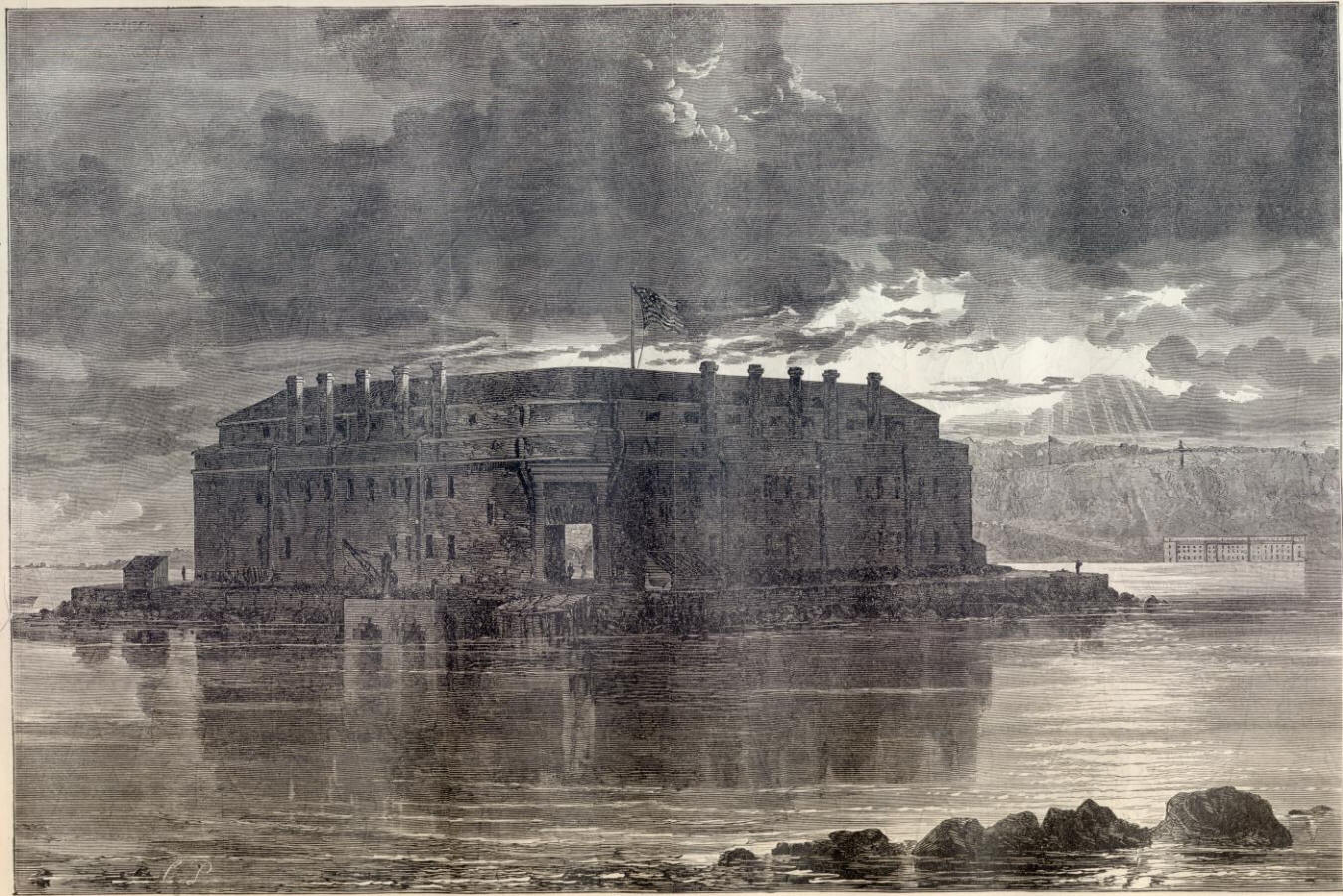
Fort Lafayette, site of Kennedy's execution

After his capture, Kennedy attempted to bribe his jailor to release him from the police headquarters at 300 Mulberry Street, New York City. Unable to pay the demanded amount, he unsuccessfully requested funds from Southern sympathizers through letters. Ultimately, his jailor had only been pretending to be corruptible; he had been secretly turning in Kennedy's letters to the police. The letters were entered as evidence for the trial.

Kennedy was decried in the Northern press as a "Southern terrorist." He was transported to Fort Lafayette to a military hearing chaired by General Fitz Henry Warren, while being represented by former West Point classmate Edwin Stoughton. His trial began on January 17, 1865. The trial, under Judge Advocate John A. Bolles ended on February 27; despite Bolles' inability to present more than circumstantial evidence, or to find a witness who had observed Kennedy perform any suspicious activities, Kennedy was found guilty on all charges and sentenced to hang. Stoughton appealed to President Lincoln to commute Kennedy's sentence to life imprisonment, but the appeal was refused.

Kennedy attempted to escape on March 19, but was foiled in the attempt and consequently spent his last days in irons. He made a confession to the camp commander, Martin Burke, and Joe Howard Jr., of The New York Times. Kennedy's execution on March 25, 1865, marked the last execution of a Confederate soldier by the United States government during the Civil War.

== See also ==
- Canada and the American Civil War#Confederate activity in British North America
