= Chester (CDP), Vermont =

Census-designated place in Vermont, United States

Chester, Vermont
- Census-designated place
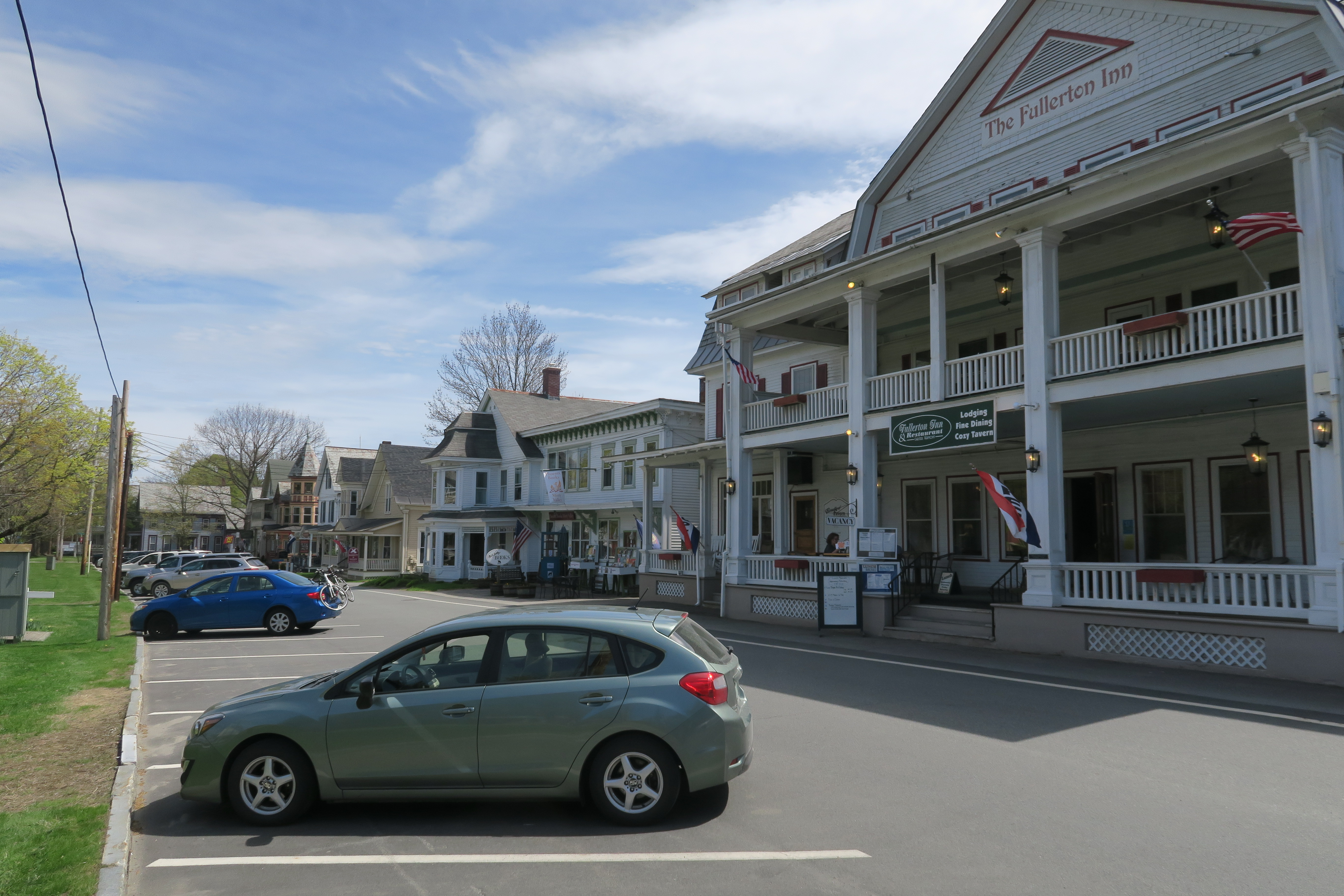
- The Fullerton Inn

- Location in Windsor County and the state of Vermont.
- Coordinates: 43°15′56″N 72°35′36″W
- Country: United States
- State: Vermont
- County: Windsor

Area
  - Total: 1.3 sq mi (3.4 km^{2})
  - Land: 1.3 sq mi (3.3 km^{2})
  - Water: 0.039 sq mi (0.1 km^{2})
- Elevation: 679 ft (207 m)

Population (2010)
  - Total: 1,005
  - Density: 790/sq mi (300/km^{2})
- Time zone: UTC-5 (Eastern (EST))
  - Summer (DST): UTC-4 (EDT)
- ZIP Code: 05143
- Area code: 802
- FIPS code: 50-13600
- GNIS feature ID: 2378125

Chester is a census-designated place (CDP) in Windsor County, Vermont, United States. The population was 1,005 at the 2010 census. The CDP is a statistical area encompassing three distinct places: the urbanized center of the town of Chester; a locale known as Chester Depot, which is separated from the town center by the tracks of the former Rutland Railroad; and the village of North Chester.

For many years, the Steamtown rail collection ran train excursions on these tracks between Chester Depot and Bellows Falls before relocating to Pennsylvania. Today, Vermont Rail System operates freight trains along the line, and the depot is still visited by passengers riding the Green Mountain Flyer, also operated by VTR.

Chester Depot is known for the Stone Village, a street with several stone houses built in similar style. Stone was an uncommon building material in rural Vermont.

== Geography ==
According to the United States Census Bureau, the CDP has a total area of 3.4 km^{2} (1.3 sq mi), all land.

== Demographics ==
As of the census of 2000, there were 999 people, 488 households, and 264 families residing in the CDP. The population density was 292.2 people /km^{2} (757 people/mi^{2}). There were 536 housing units at an average density of 156.8 units /km^{2} (406 units/mi^{2}). The racial makeup of the CDP was 98.60% White, 0.60% African American, 0.10% Native American, 0.20% Asian, and 0.50% from two or more races. Hispanic or Latino of any race were 0.60% of the population.

There were 488 households, out of which 25.4% had children under the age of 18 living with them, 35.9% were married couples living together, 14.1% had a female householder with no husband present, and 45.9% were non-families. 39.3% of all households were made up of individuals, and 17.8% had someone living alone who was 65 years of age or older. The average household size was 2.05 and the average family size was 2.74.

In the CDP, the population was spread out, with 22.7% under the age of 18, 6.0% from 18 to 24, 25.9% from 25 to 44, 24.0% from 45 to 64, and 21.3% who were 65 years of age or older. The median age was 42 years. For every 100 females, there were 77.4 males. For every 100 females age 18 and over, there were 75.1 males.

The median income for a household in the CDP was $30,804, and the median income for a family was $41,250. Males had a median income of $30,536 versus $25,208 for females. The per capita income for the CDP was $18,863. About 7.2% of families and 12.3% of the population were below the poverty line, including 19.6% of those under age 18 and 8.4% of those age 65 or over.
