= Greenwood House =

Historic house in Vermont, United States

- U.S. National Register of Historic Places
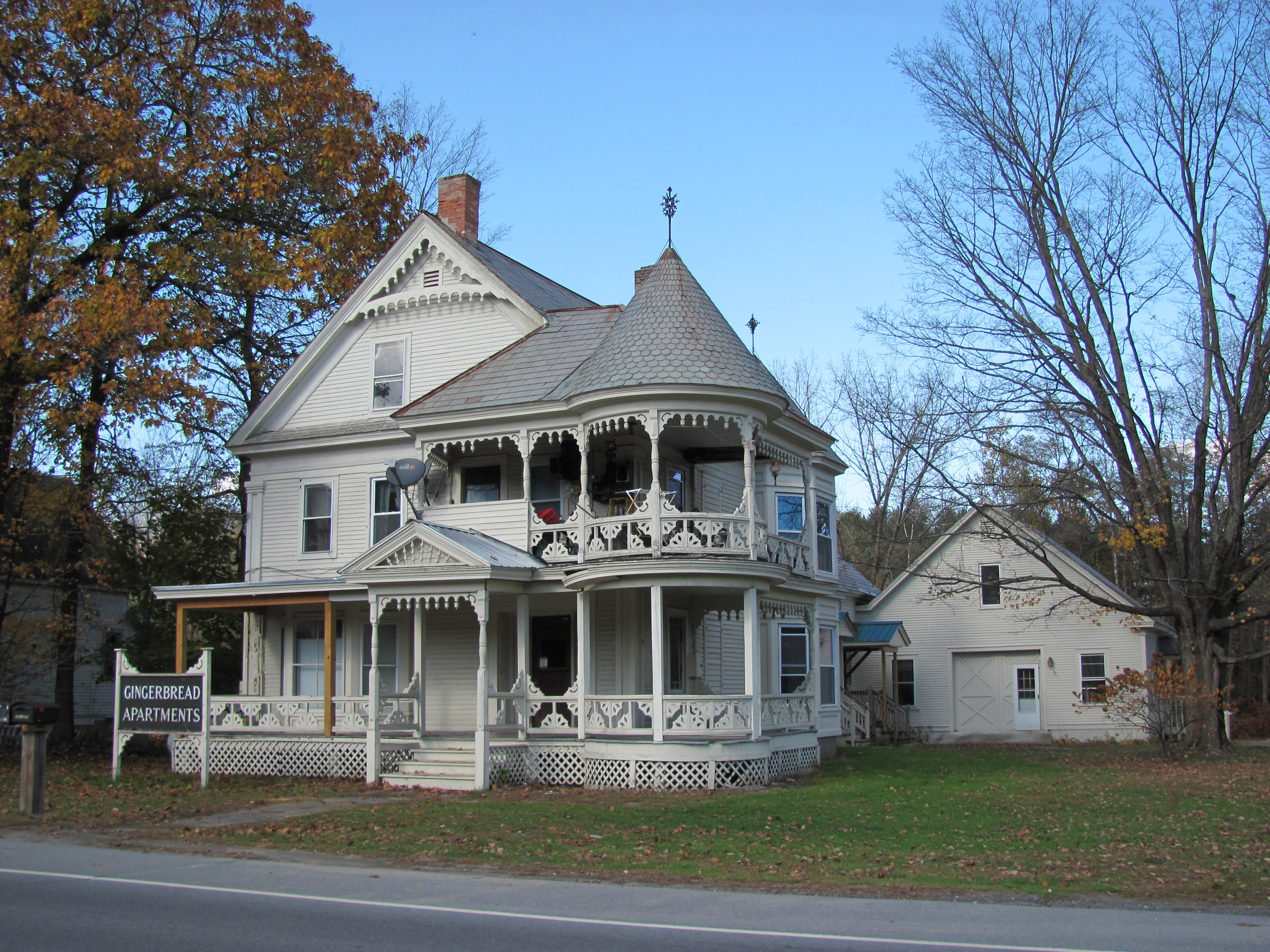

- Location within Vermont
- Location: VT 103, Chester, Vermont
- Coordinates: 43°15′28″N 72°35′14″W
- Area: 0.8 acres (0.32 ha)
- Built: 1850
- Architectural style: Greek Revival, Queen Anne
- NRHP reference No.: 85003442
- Added to NRHP: October 31, 1985

The Greenwood House, now the Gingerbread Apartments, is a historic house on Vermont Route 103 in Chester, Vermont. Built about 1850 and restyled about 1900, it is an architecturally distinctive blend of Greek Revival and Late Victorian styles. It was listed on the National Register of Historic Places in 1985.

== Description and history ==
The Greenwood House stands on the north side of Vermont 103, just east of its crossing of the Middle Branch Williams River. It is a 2 1/2-story wood-frame structure, with a front-facing gabled roof, clapboard siding, and granite foundation. The front facade is dominated by elaborate Victorian gingerbread styling, which adorns the gable and the wraparound porch, which has a two-story rounded projection at the right corner. The house's Greek Revival past is discernible in corner pilasters rising to an entablature below the pedimented gable. The interior of the house, despite alterations and conversion to apartments, retains a number of features from both its Greek Revival origin and its later Queen Anne redecoration.

The house is believed to have been built about 1850 by an unknown owner. At the time, it would have marked the southern end of Chester's village, and stood opposite the local district school, also a Greek Revival building. The house was acquired sometime after 1870 by the Haselton family, whose daughter Hattie married John Greenwood. The Greenwoods undertook a major renovation of the building in about 1900, adding the elaborate front porch and other features. The house and its carriage barn (which apparently dates to the Haselton ownership period, but also has some Greek Revival features) were converted into apartments in the late 1960s. The building is often featured in tourism-related articles featuring the town.

== See also ==
- National Register of Historic Places listings in Windsor County, Vermont
