= The Chester Telegraph =

- Type: Digital newspaper
- Owner: Cynthia Prairie
- Founded: 2012
- Headquarters: Chester, Vermont
- Website: chestertelegraph.org

The Chester Telegraph is an online newspaper serving Chester, Andover, Londonderry, Weston, Grafton, Windham and Cavendish in the U.S. state of Vermont.

== History ==
The Chester Telegraph was launched in January 2012 by Cynthia Prairie, a veteran journalist with a background in editing and reporting in North Carolina, Chicago, Buffalo and Maryland.

The Telegraph grew out of an earlier grant-funded project to provide information about two major bridge closures in the town, funded by the United States Department of Agriculture. Working on that project, she says, made her realize that Chester, and many small towns in Vermont, were in "news deserts," and that she could help fill that gap.

In 2018 it was one of 18 online-only news publishers to win "micro-grants" from the Local Independent Online News Publishers.

It was one of the first online-only news outlets focused on a small town in Vermont.

== Operations ==
As an online news source, The Telegraph publishes news as it becomes available rather than on a daily or weekly schedule. Every Wednesday morning, it sends out an email "news alert," a digest of all the news gathered since the previous news alert was sent.

The Telegraph focuses on local government and accountability coverage as well as business and the economic health of these small Vermont towns. It also covers the Two Rivers Supervisory Union, which is made up of the Green Mountain Unified School District and the Ludlow-Mt. Holly Unified Union School District, and has provided extensive coverage of the formation of these districts under Vermont's Act 46 school consolidation law.

Telegraph articles are indexed and archived by NewsBank, which makes the articles available to universities, libraries and government entities throughout the world.

It is listed on the official website of the town of Chester.
