= James Drury (soldier) =

James John Drury
- Born: August 15, 1835; Limerick, Ireland
- Died: December 25, 1919 (aged 84); Lovilia, Iowa
- Burial place: Lovilia Cemetery
- Military career
- Allegiance: United States of America
- Branch: United States Army
- Service years: 1861 - 1865
- Rank: Sergeant
- Units: Company C, 4th Vermont Volunteer Infantry Regiment
- Conflicts: Battle of Jerusalem Plank Road
- Awards: Medal of Honor

James John Drury (August 15, 1835 – December 25, 1919) was an Irish soldier who fought in the American Civil War. Drury received the United States' highest award for bravery during combat, the Medal of Honor, for his action during the Battle of Jerusalem Plank Road in Virginia on June 23, 1864. He was honored with the award on January 18, 1893.

== Biography ==
Drury was born in Limerick, Ireland, on August 15, 1835. He joined the 4th Vermont Infantry in August 1861, and mustered out with his regiment in July 1865. He died on December 25, 1919, and his remains are interred at the Lovilia Cemetery in Lovilia, Iowa.

== Medal of Honor citation ==
Saved the colors of his regiment when it was surrounded by a much larger force of the enemy and after the greater part of the regiment had been killed or captured.

== See also ==
- List of American Civil War Medal of Honor recipients: A–F
