= George Howe (attorney) =

American lawyer and politician

Member of the Vermont Senate
- In office 1874–1875 Serving with Andrew A. Wyman
- Preceded by: Jacob Estey; John L. Butterfield
- Succeeded by: Oscar E. Butterfield; Eleazer L. Waterman

United States Attorney for the District of Vermont
- In office 1861–1864
- President: Abraham Lincoln
- Preceded by: Henry E. Stoughton
- Succeeded by: Dudley C. Denison

State's Attorney of Windham County, Vermont
- In office 1858–1860
- Preceded by: Benjamin L. Knowlton
- Succeeded by: Jabez D. Bridgman

Personal details
- Born: July 4, 1824 Vernon, Vermont
- Died: February 21, 1888 (aged 63) Vernon, Vermont
- Resting place: North Vernon Cemetery, Vernon, Vermont
- Party: Republican
- Spouse(s): Mary Ann Willard (1824-1905), m. 1825
- Children: 1
- Education: Harvard Law School
- Profession: Attorney

George Howe (July 4, 1824 – February 21, 1888) was a Vermont attorney and politician. Howe was most notable for his service as United States Attorney for the District of Vermont from 1861 to 1864 and a member of the Vermont Senate from 1874 to 1875.

== Biography ==
George Howe was born in Vernon, Vermont on July 4, 1824, the son of Ebenezer Howe Jr. and Lydia (Fowler) Howe. He was educated in Vernon, and studied law with Judge Asa Keyes of Brattleboro. In 1845, he began attendance at Harvard Law School, and he received his ll.b. degree in 1847. Howe completed his legal studies in the office of William Czar Bradley in Westminster. He was admitted to the bar in 1847, and practiced in Brattleboro.

Howe spent several years in California in the late 1840s and early 1850s before returning to Brattleboro to reestablish his law practice. A Republican, he served as Windham County's State's Attorney from 1858 to 1860. In 1861, he was appointed United States Attorney for the District of Vermont, and he served until 1864. Howe represented Windham County in the Vermont Senate from 1874 to 1875, and he was a delegate to the 1876 Republican National Convention.

In 1880, Howe accepted a federal government position as a pension examiner, which required him to travel throughout New England to verify the details of applications and adjudicate claims. In the last years of his life, Howe's health began to fail and he retired to Vernon.

== Death and burial ==
Howe died in Vernon on February 21, 1888. He was buried at North Vernon Cemetery in Vernon.

== Family ==
In 1850, Howe married Mary Ann Willard (1824-1905) of Westminster. They were the parents of a son, George E. Howe (1862-1920), who graduated from Harvard College and Harvard Law School and became a successful attorney in Boston.

== Sources ==
=== Books ===
- Cabot, Mary R. (1922). Annals of Brattleboro, 1681-1895. Vol. II. Brattleboro: E. L. Hildreth & Co.

=== Internet ===
- Washburn, Cyrus (Vernon, VT Town Clerk) (July 4, 1824). "Vermont Vital Records, 1720-1908, Birth Record for George Howe". Ancestry.com. Provo, UT: Ancestry.com, LLC.
