= Carlos H. Rich =

Soldier and veteran of the American Civil War

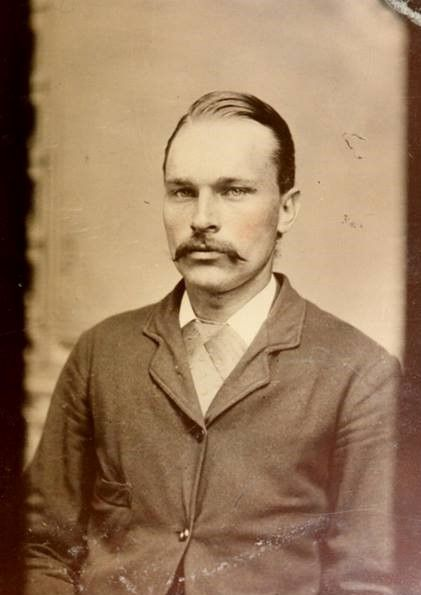
- Born: February 11, 1841; Stanstead, Province of Canada
- Died: May 29, 1918 (aged 77); Bennington, Vermont
- Burial place: Roxbury Cemetery, Roxbury, Vermont
- Military career
- Allegiance: United States of America
- Branch: United States Army; Union Army
- Rank: First Sergeant
- Units: Company K, 4th Vermont Volunteer Infantry Regiment
- Conflicts: Battle of the Wilderness, Virginia
- Awards: Medal of Honor

Carlos H. Rich (February 11, 1841– May 29, 1918) was a Canadian-born soldier who fought for the Union Army during the American Civil War. He received the Medal of Honor for valor.

== Biography ==
Rich received the Medal of Honor on January 4, 1895, for his actions at the Battle of the Wilderness, Virginia on May 5, 1864, while with Company K of the 4th Vermont Volunteer Infantry Regiment.

== Medal of Honor citation ==
Citation:

The President of the United States of America, in the name of Congress, takes pleasure in presenting the Medal of Honor to First Sergeant Carlos H. Rich, United States Army, for extraordinary heroism on 5 May 1864, while serving with Company K, 4th Vermont Infantry, in action during the Wilderness Campaign, Virginia. First Sergeant Rich saved the life of an officer.

== See also ==
- List of American Civil War Medal of Honor recipients: Q–S
