= Daniel D. Wheeler =

American Union soldier during Civil War

Daniel Davis Wheeler (July 12, 1841 – July 27, 1916) was an American soldier and recipient of the Medal of Honor for actions during the American Civil War.

== Biography ==
Daniel D. Wheeler was born 12 July, 1841 and was born in Cavendish, Windsor County, Vermont. He fought in multiple battles of the American Civil War with the 4th Vermont Infantry regiment as a First Lieutenant. After the war, he was commissioned in the Regular Army and retired in 1905 with the rank of Brigadier General.

General Wheeler was a companion of the California Commandery of the Military Order of the Loyal Legion of the United States.

Wheeler spent the last years of his life in Fredericksburg, Virginia and died there on 27 July, 1916. He is interred in the City Cemetery where in May, 2012, plaques commemorating his service in the Union Army and his Medal of Honor were installed on his grave.

== Medal of Honor Citation ==
For distinguished bravery in action on 3 May 1863, in action at Salem Heights, Fredericksburg, Virginia, where he was wounded and had a horse shot from under him.
