= Clarence Adams (criminal) =

American burglar and politician

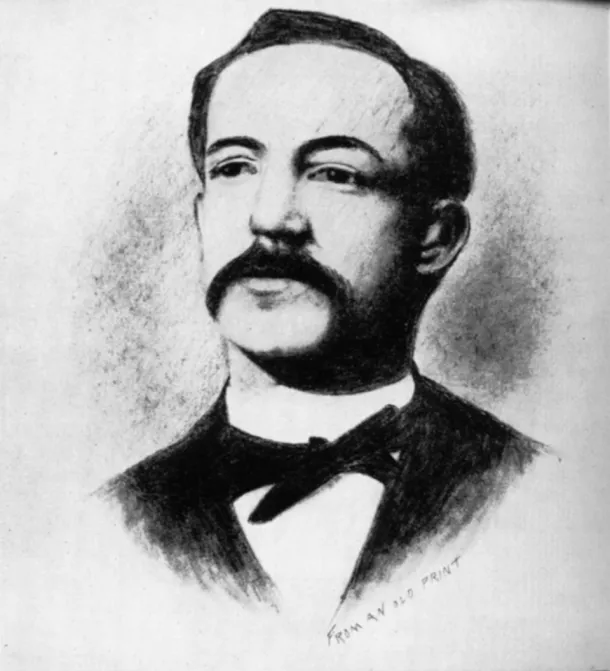

Member of the Vermont House of Representatives
- In office 1894

Personal details
- Born: November 18, 1857 Cavendish, Vermont, U.S.
- Died: February 26, 1904 (aged 46) Windsor, Vermont
- Resting place: Cavendish Village Cemetery; Cavendish, Vermont
- Party: Republican
- Occupation: Farmer; Burglar; Politician

Clarence A. Adams (November 18, 1857 – February 26, 1904) was an American politician and serial burglar. He is believed to be responsible for a series of burglaries that took place in Chester, Vermont between 1886 and 1902 and pled guilty to eight of them. During the crime spree, Adams served on Chester's board of selectmen and represented the town in the Vermont House of Representatives. As a selectman, he took a leading role into the investigation of the burglaries he was later believed to have committed.

== Early life ==
Adams was born in Cavendish, Vermont on November 18, 1857, to Washington Adams and Dene H. (Walker) Hagar. His only sibling, Marcellus, died during infancy. In 1860, the family moved to a 270-acre farm in Chester, Vermont. Adams remained on the farm into his adulthood and took it over after the death of his parents.

== Public service ==
In 1889 and 1892, Adams was a member of the Chester board of selectmen. In 1894, he represented the town in the Vermont House of Representatives. He also was deacon at the local church, a founding trustee of the Whiting Library, a village lister, and an incorporator of the Chester Savings Bank.

== Burglaries ==
In September 1886, the Adams and Davis Co. in Chester discovered a safe had been cracked. This began a series of burglaries in the town of seemingly random items, including a box of bow ties, a bag of doughnuts, roofing shingles, bicycle, and sacks of grain, stolen from various merchants. A gristmill owned by Adams' close friend Charles Waterman was burglarized at least 16 times, and the general store owned by James E. Pollard was burglarized six times. The burglaries later progressed to residences. In one instance, a couple awoke to a masked man in their home with a revolver who stole $1,500 and had killed their dog to avoid it barking. The thief threatened to have an accomplice shoot them dead if they left the house before daylight.

Clarence Adams became selectman in 1892 and took an active and public interest in investigating the burglaries, which by this point were occurring weekly. He had the board of selectmen hire a detective on the case and offered a $500 reward for the bandit's capture. Adams personally examined crime scenes, interviewed victims, and added an additional $100 of his own money to the reward. He advised businesses on heightened security practices, helping Pollard install a high-tech burglar alarm at his general store, convincing Waterman to hire a night watchman, and persuading druggist F. W. Pierce to sell revolvers at his store. However, none of the tactics were successful. The burglar entered the store through the only unarmed window, burglarized Waterman's mill on the watchman's night off, and stole the guns before Pierce could sell them.

== Arrest ==
Around 9:30 pm on July 29, 1902, Adams was shot in the leg by a shotgun. He arrived home about a half-hour later and asked his housekeeper to send for a doctor. Adams claimed that he had been shot and robbed by two masked highwayman about two miles from his home. Physicians removed 81 pieces of shot from Adams' legs.

Gardner Waterman, the son of Charles Waterman, had heard the gunshot and believed it came from a spring-gun he and his father had set up at their mill. He went to town and got his father and a constable. The trio went to the mill where the window had been broken, the gun had been set off, and bloody shards of glass had been left behind. The constable was summoned to Adams' home for the reported robbery. After confirming that the shot in Adams' leg matched the one from Waterman's mill, police searched his home and found numerous stolen items hidden throughout the residence. He was arrested, but was too ill to be transported, so an officer was stationed at his bedside. Town treasurer A. D. T. Herrick, who believed that Adams was suffering from temporary insanity during the burglary, furnished his bond. However, once more evidence came out, Herrick withdrew the bond.

On August 3, 1902, Adams confessed to several burglaries over the past six years. He stated that he had committed the robberies because "there was too much fun in it. I never robbed because I needed money, but simply because robbing and afterward listening to the comments of the people amused me".

On August 12, he was placed in jail at Woodstock, Vermont. Due to his injuries, he had to be transported on a mattress placed in a wagon. On August 13, Adams appeared before Judge Seneca Haselton for his arraignment. Adams pled guilty to all eight counts and his attorneys, Frank Plumley and W. B. C. Stickney, asked for clemency due to Adams' high standing in the community and because the 100-year sentence he was facing was too harsh. Haselton sentenced him to 9 to 10 years in state prison.

== Death ==
Eighteen months into his sentence, Adams fell ill during a pneumonia outbreak at the Vermont State Prison and died four days later on February 26, 1904. Newspapers reported on a rumor that Adams had faked his death by placing himself in a hypnotic state and had fled to Canada. This claim was rejected by the prison physician, Dr. John D. Brewster, who pronounced Adams dead, as well as the sexton of the cemetery Adams was buried in, who noticed a scar from a gunshot wound on one of the body's legs.
