= Edwin W. Stoughton =

American lawyer and diplomat (1818–1882)

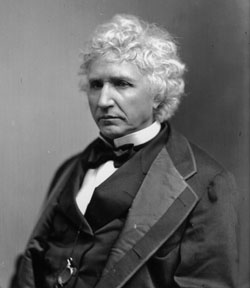

United States Minister to Russia
- In office October 30, 1877 – March 2, 1879
- President: Rutherford B. Hayes
- Preceded by: George H. Boker
- Succeeded by: John W. Foster

Personal details
- Born: May 4, 1818 Springfield, Vermont
- Died: January 7, 1882 (aged 63) New York City, New York
- Resting place: Old South Church Cemetery in Windsor, Vermont
- Party: Republican
- Profession: Lawyer

Edwin Wallace Stoughton (May 14, 1818 – January 7, 1882) was an American lawyer and diplomat.

== Biography ==
Edwin Wallace Stoughton was born in Springfield, Vermont on May 4, 1818. He was the son of Thomas Potwine Stoughton and Susan Bradley. At age 18 he moved to New York City to study law, was admitted to the bar, and began a practice.

Stoughton was a famed patent lawyer, most notably working for Charles Goodyear during Goodyear's lawsuits over his process for using heat and sulphur to process rubber (Vulcanization).

A member of the Stalwart faction of the Republican Party, during the Ulysses S. Grant administration Stoughton published a treatise defending Grant's use of federal troops in Louisiana during Reconstruction.

After the disputed Hayes-Tilden presidential election of 1876 he defended Hayes' claim to the office, and was one of the lawyers who represented Hayes before the Electoral Commission appointed to settle the contest. When Hayes took office he displayed his gratitude by naming Stoughton Minister to Russia. He served in Saint Petersburg until becoming ill in 1879, when he resigned.

Stoughton never fully recovered his health and lived in retirement until his death. He died in New York City on January 7, 1882. Former President Grant was one of the pallbearers at his funeral. He was buried at the Old South Church Cemetery in Windsor, Vermont.

== Family ==
Edwin Wallace Stoughton was the brother of Henry Evander Stoughton, with whom he practiced law. He was the uncle of Edwin Henry Stoughton and Charles Bradley Stoughton, both of whom served as Union Army generals during the American Civil War. He was also the stepfather of philosopher and historian John Fiske.
