= Stone Village Historic District =

Historic district in Vermont, United States

- U.S. National Register of Historic Places
- U.S. Historic district
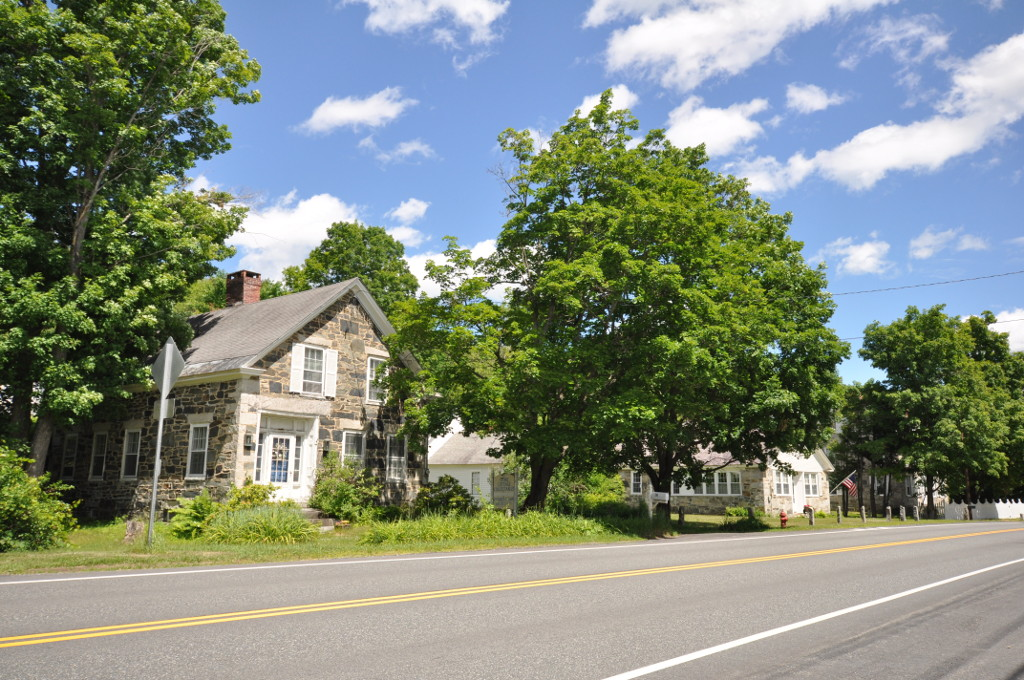

- Location within Vermont Location within the United States
- Location: Both sides of VT 103 N of Williams River, Chester, Vermont
- Coordinates: 43°16′24″N 72°35′35″W
- Area: 100 acres (40 ha)
- Built: 1834
- Built by: Clark, Alison & Wiley
- Architectural style: Greek Revival, Cape Cod; I house
- NRHP reference No.: 74000329
- Added to NRHP: May 17, 1974

The Stone Village Historic District encompasses a distinctive collection of stone buildings on Vermont Route 103 in Chester, Vermont, United States. Dating to the first half of the 19th century are a remarkable concentration of buildings constructed in a regionally distinctive snecked ashlar technique brought to the area by Scottish masons. The district was listed on the National Register of Historic Places in 1974.

== Description and history ==
In the early 1830s, skilled masons from Scotland came to central Vermont to work on building projects there. A number of these, mainly from the Aberdeen area, were experienced in snecked ashlar construction, in which plates of stone are affixed to a rubblestone wall. This type of construction is generally rare in the United States, and is found on about 50 surviving buildings in the state of Vermont. The highest concentration of them is on the north side of Chester Depot village, lining Vermont Route 103, and is known locally as the Stone Village.

Two Scottish masons, brothers Alison and Wiley Clark, came to the town of Chester in 1832 to work on large factory building (now no longer standing). In 1834, Doctor Ptolmey Edson hired the brothers to build his house, which was the first snecked ashlar structure in the village. It was followed by a series of other buildings, most of which are residences. The church and district school were also built of stone, possibly due to the influence of Dr. Edson, who sat on their respective building committees. Most of the houses are either Cape-style houses of 1 1/2 stories or two-story structures, in either case with some Greek Revival styling in the trim details. Thirteen of the seventeen buildings in the district are stone; the other four date to a similar time period (roughly 1830–50). One building, a large wood-frame tavern house at the northern end of the district, was destroyed by fire in 2012.

== See also ==
- National Register of Historic Places listings in Windsor County, Vermont
