= Immanuel Episcopal Church (Bellows Falls, Vermont) =

Church building in Bellows Falls, Vermont

Coordinates: 43.133725°N 72.4454799°W

The present Immanuel Episcopal Church was finished in Bellows Falls in Vermont in 1869 and was designed by the renowned Gothic Revival architect Richard M. Upjohn. The building's Gothic style would have been typical of 14th-century France. The multi-colored fish scale slate roof is typical of the Victorian Gothic style of architecture.

One of the building's notable features is the buttressed and pinnacled bell tower that has an octagonal "lantern"-styled top. There is a Paul Revere bell hanging in the tower that hung in the original 1817 church that was on the same site.

The church reported 37 members in 2021 and 34 members in 2023; no membership statistics were reported in 2024 parochial reports. Plate and pledge income reported for the congregation in 2024 was $13,519 with average Sunday attendance (ASA) of 14 persons. This was a relative decrease from ASA of 39 reported in 2016.
