= Chester, Vermont =

- Town
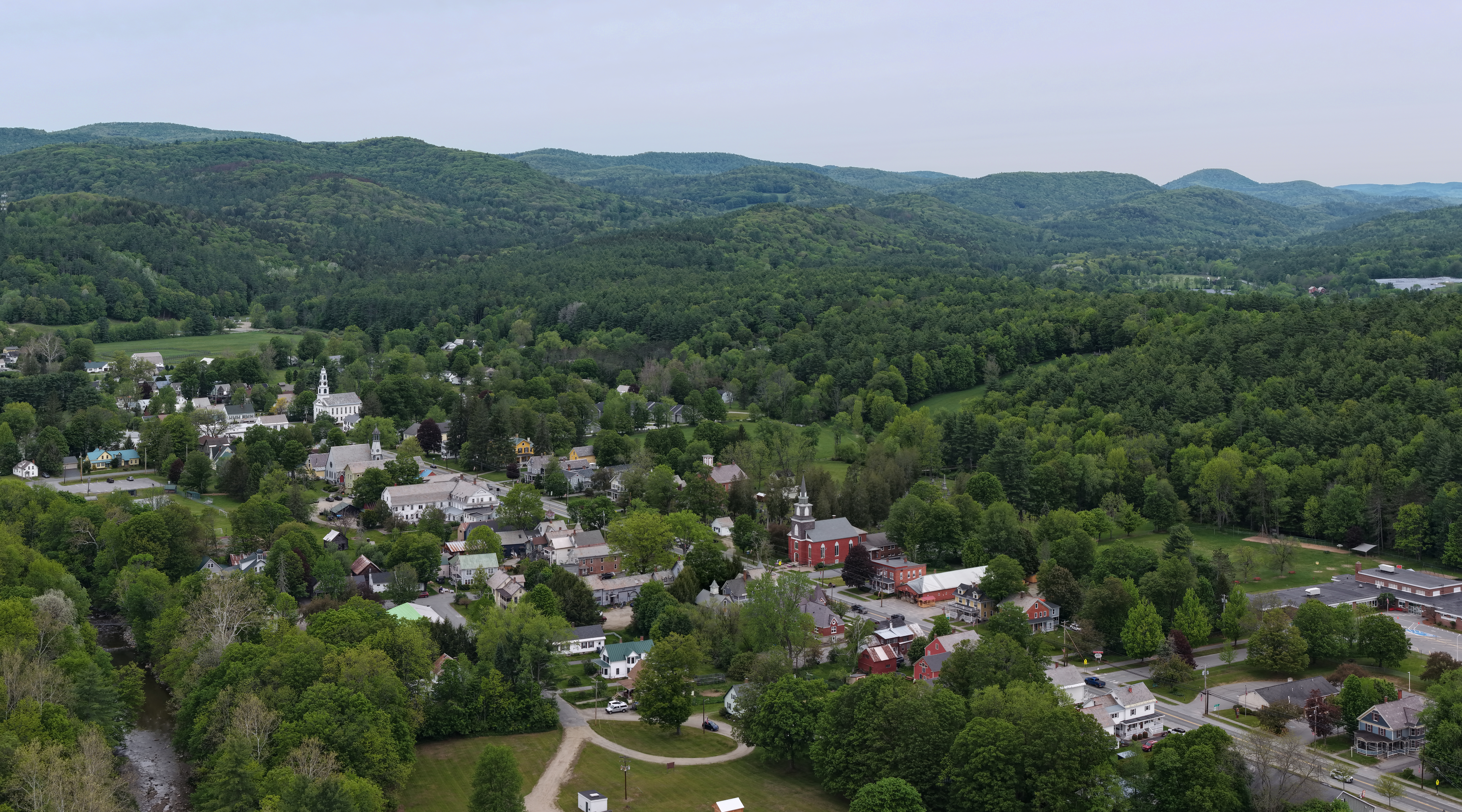
- Chester, Vermont, from the southeast

- Location in Windsor County and the state of Vermont.
- Coordinates: 43°16′17″N 72°37′04″W
- Country: United States
- State: Vermont
- County: Windsor
- Communities: Chester; Baileys Mills; Gassetts; North Chester; Reedville

Area
  - Total: 55.9 sq mi (144.9 km^{2})
  - Land: 55.7 sq mi (144.2 km^{2})
  - Water: 0.27 sq mi (0.7 km^{2})
- Elevation: 850 ft (260 m)

Population (2020)
  - Total: 3,005
  - Density: 53.97/sq mi (20.84/km^{2})
- Time zone: UTC-5 (Eastern (EST))
  - Summer (DST): UTC-4 (EDT)
- ZIP Code: 05143
- Area code: 802
- FIPS code: 50-13675
- GNIS feature ID: 1462070
- Website: chestervt.gov

Chester is a town in Windsor County, Vermont, United States. The population was 3,005 at the 2020 census.

== History ==
The town was originally chartered by New Hampshire Governor Benning Wentworth as Flamstead in 1754. The terms of the charter were not met and the town was re-chartered as New Flamstead in 1761. In 1766, a patent was issued by New York that changed the name of the town to Chester, after George Augustus Frederick, the Earl of Chester and the eldest son of King George III. Later, the governing authority of Chester reverted to the 1761 charter by an act of the Vermont legislature, although it left the name "Chester" in place. 2011 was thus the 250th anniversary of the town.

== Geography ==
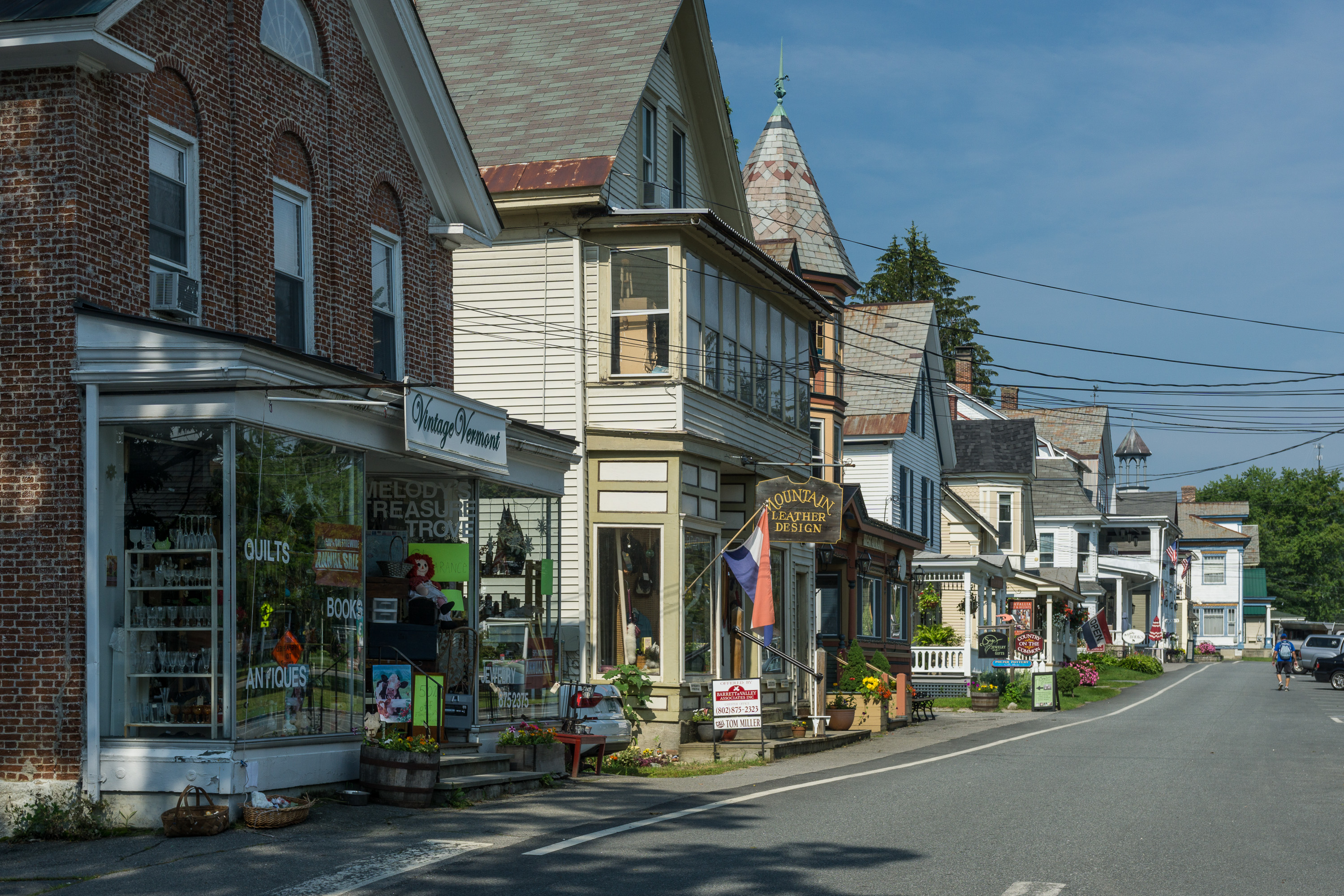
Shops along Main Street (Vermont Route 11)

According to the United States Census Bureau, the town has a total area of 55.9 square miles (144.9 km^{2}), of which 55.7 square miles (144.2 km^{2}) is land and 0.27 square miles (0.7 km^{2}), or 0.46%, is water.

A prominent geological feature of the town is the Williams River, a tributary of the Connecticut River, whose three branches come together as a central river and run through Chester. Residents use it extensively for recreation; especially fishing and swimming. The banks, covered bridges, waters and nearby homes suffered major damage during Hurricane Irene in 2011. The flooding was caused by Irene's rains coupled with the basin having poor drainage in the rugged, hilly land with steep slopes.

== Demographics ==
Historical population
Census	Pop.	Note	%±
1790	981		—
1800	1,878		91.4%
1810	2,370		26.2%
1820	2,493		5.2%
1830	2,320		−6.9%
1840	2,305		−0.6%
1850	2,001		−13.2%
1860	2,126		6.2%
1870	2,052		−3.5%
1880	1,901		−7.4%
1890	1,787		−6.0%
1900	1,775		−0.7%
1910	1,784		0.5%
1920	1,633		−8.5%
1930	1,666		2.0%
1940	1,740		4.4%
1950	1,981		13.9%
1960	2,318		17.0%
1970	2,371		2.3%
1980	2,791		17.7%
1990	2,832		1.5%
2000	3,044		7.5%
2010	3,154		3.6%
2020	3,005		−4.7%
U.S. Decennial Census

As of the census of 2010, 3,154 people resided in Chester, with 1,793 housing units. In 2010, Chester had 510 residents 14 years old and younger; 205 15 to 19; 277 20 to 29; 298 ages 30 to 39; and 418 ages 40 to 49. Our 0-49 age group makes up 53.2% of the Chester population. Of the entire population, 17.6% is 50 to 59 years old, 13.1% is 60 to 69; 7.6% is between 70 and 79 and 5.2% is 80 and older.

As in 2000, the majority of town residents in 2010 are female (1,638 to 1,516 male compared to 1,574 to 1,470 10 years ago). In 2010, 1,262 of the women and 1,117 of the men are older than 19.

Chester is 97.5% white (down slightly from 98.8%) while Vermont as a whole is 95.3% white. Chester's non-Caucasian population, however, has more than doubled, from 38 residents in 2000 to 78 in 2010.

The Native America/Alaskan population has risen from 3 in 2000 to 16 in 2010, while Chester's Asian population has risen from 7 to 15 and its Hispanic populace grew from 21 in 2000 to 35 in 2010. In the meantime, the number of African-American residents dropped from 10 in 2000 to 7 in 2010. And the number of residents claiming more than one race more than doubled, from 17 in 2000 to 37 in 2010.

As of the 2000 census, the median income for a household in the town was $39,417, and the median income for a family was $47,083. Males had a median income of $32,744 versus $26,114 for females. The per capita income for the town was $19,661. About 3.8% of families and 7.0% of the population were below the poverty line, including 9.3% of those under age 18 and 7.7% of those age 65 or over.

== Transportation ==
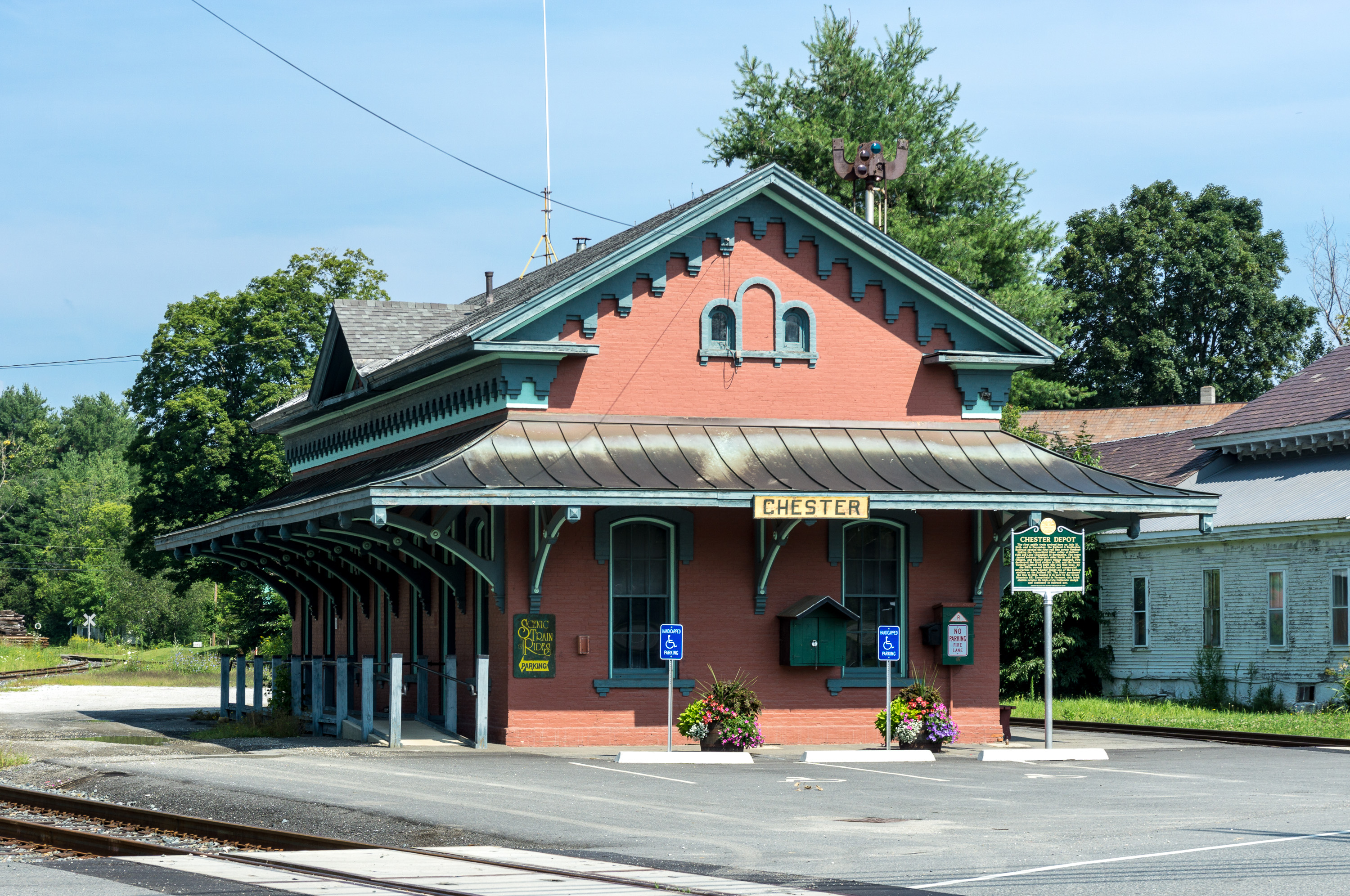
Old train station

Chester is served by Vermont routes 10, 11, 35 and 103. Although Interstate 91 does not pass through the town, Chester is served by exit 6 in nearby Rockingham.

== Arts and culture ==
=== Annual cultural events ===
Chester hosts The Chester Fall Festival on the Green in September, and the Winter Carnival in February.

=== Tourism ===
Chester is home to the Stone Village Historic District and Chester Village Historic District. Both districts are listed in the National Register of Historic Places. The Stone Village section is located along Vermont Route 103 in North Chester, across the Williams River from Chester Center. It is known for the many houses made of local granite. The Chester Factory Village has homes that were built between 1750 and 1924, and includes Victorian, Colonial Revival and Federal style architecture. Both areas are popular tourist destinations.

Registered historic sites:

- Chester Village Historic District – Roughly bounded by Lovers Lane Brook, Maple St., Williams River, Middle Branch & Lovers Lane (added September 8, 1985)
- Greenwood House – VT 103 (added December 1, 1985)
- Jeffrey House – North St. (added July 13, 1974)
- Stone Village Historic District – Both sides of VT 103 (added June 17, 1974)

== Media ==
The Chester Telegraph, an online newspaper, is based in Chester, and was founded in 2011. It grew out of the website www.chestervermont.org, which was funded by USDA Rural Development. The Telegraph focuses on local news in Chester and the surrounding towns of Andover, Grafton, Londonderry, and Weston.

== Notable people ==
- Clarence Adams, politician and serial burglar
- Robert Alden (a.k.a. Edwin Hyde Alden), clergyman commemorated in the books of Laura Ingalls Wilder
- Melvin Baldwin, U.S. Representative from Minnesota.
- Fernando C. Beaman, US congressman from Michigan
- Paul Bremer, Administrator, Coalition Provisional Authority, and de facto interim Iraqi head of state, (12 May 2003 – 28 June 2004)
- Thomas Chandler Jr., a founder of Chester who served as Speaker of the Vermont House of Representatives and was Vermont's first Secretary of State
- John Royston Coleman, president of Haverford College
- Donald J. Cram, Nobel Prize for Chemistry, 1987
- Anna Dewdney, children's book author; lived in Chester until her death in September 2016
- Franklin Edson, mayor of New York City
- Merritt A. Edson, Marine Corps general
- James Robinson Graves, Baptist preacher, publisher, and author
- Albert David Hager, geologist, historian, and librarian
- Albert W. Harvey, United States Marshal for the District of Vermont
- Hugh H. Henry, United States Marshal for Vermont
- Aaron Leland, Lieutenant Governor of Vermont
- Thomas B. Marsh, Latter Day Saint leader, original member of the Quorum of Twelve Apostles
- Hannah Maynard Thompson Pickard (1812–1844), school teacher, preceptress, author
- Waitstill R. Ranney, Lieutenant Governor of Vermont
- Charles B. Stoughton, Union Army officer who attained the rank of brigadier general by brevet

== Dollar General proposal ==
In 2011 and 2012, Chester residents gained notoriety for their fight against a proposed Dollar General store. The Chester Telegraph covered the issue, which was also picked up statewide by Vermont Public Radio and outside Vermont by The New York Times. In February 2014, the Vermont Environmental Court ruled that a Dollar General could be built in Chester.

== Gallery ==
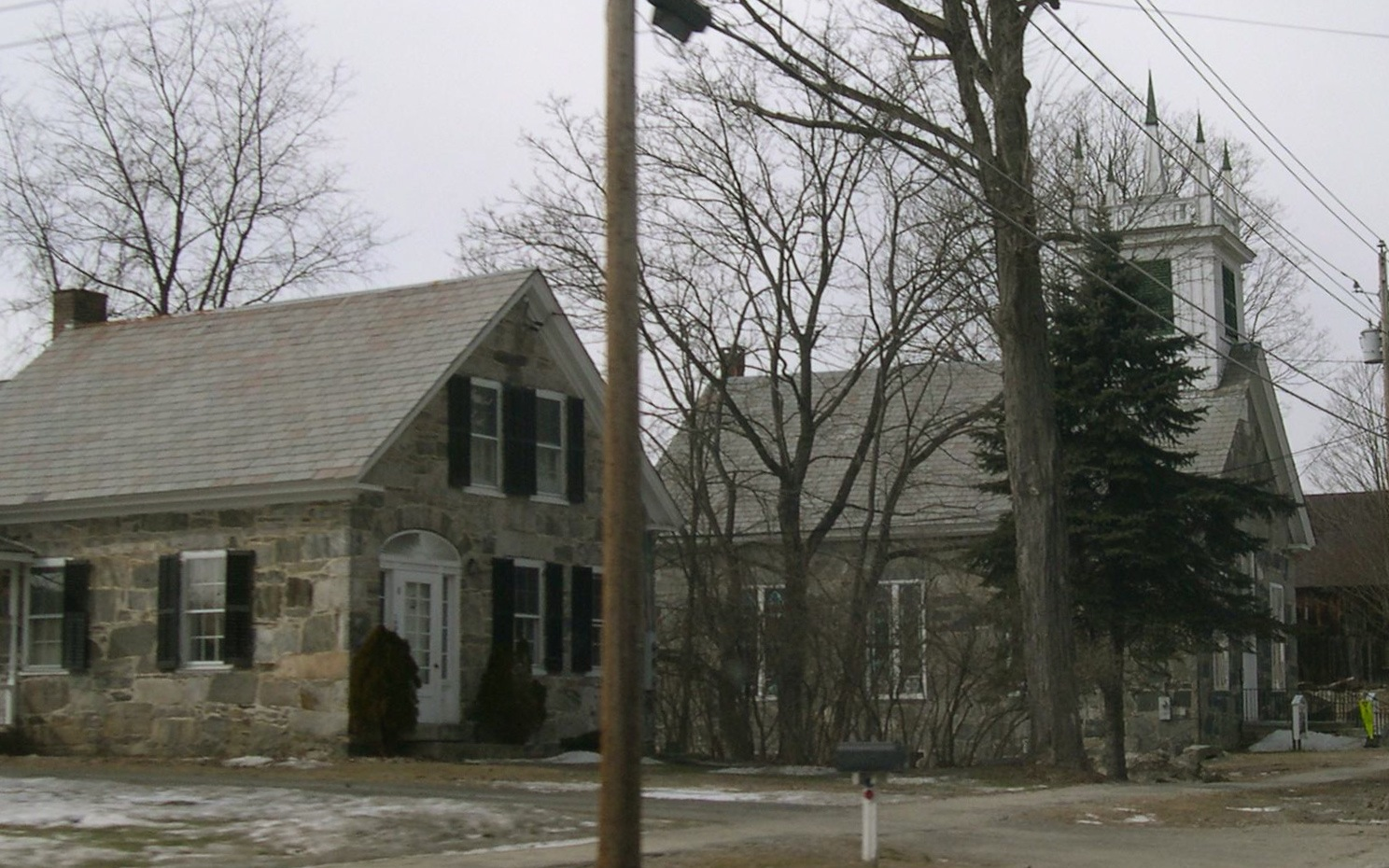
Stone Village

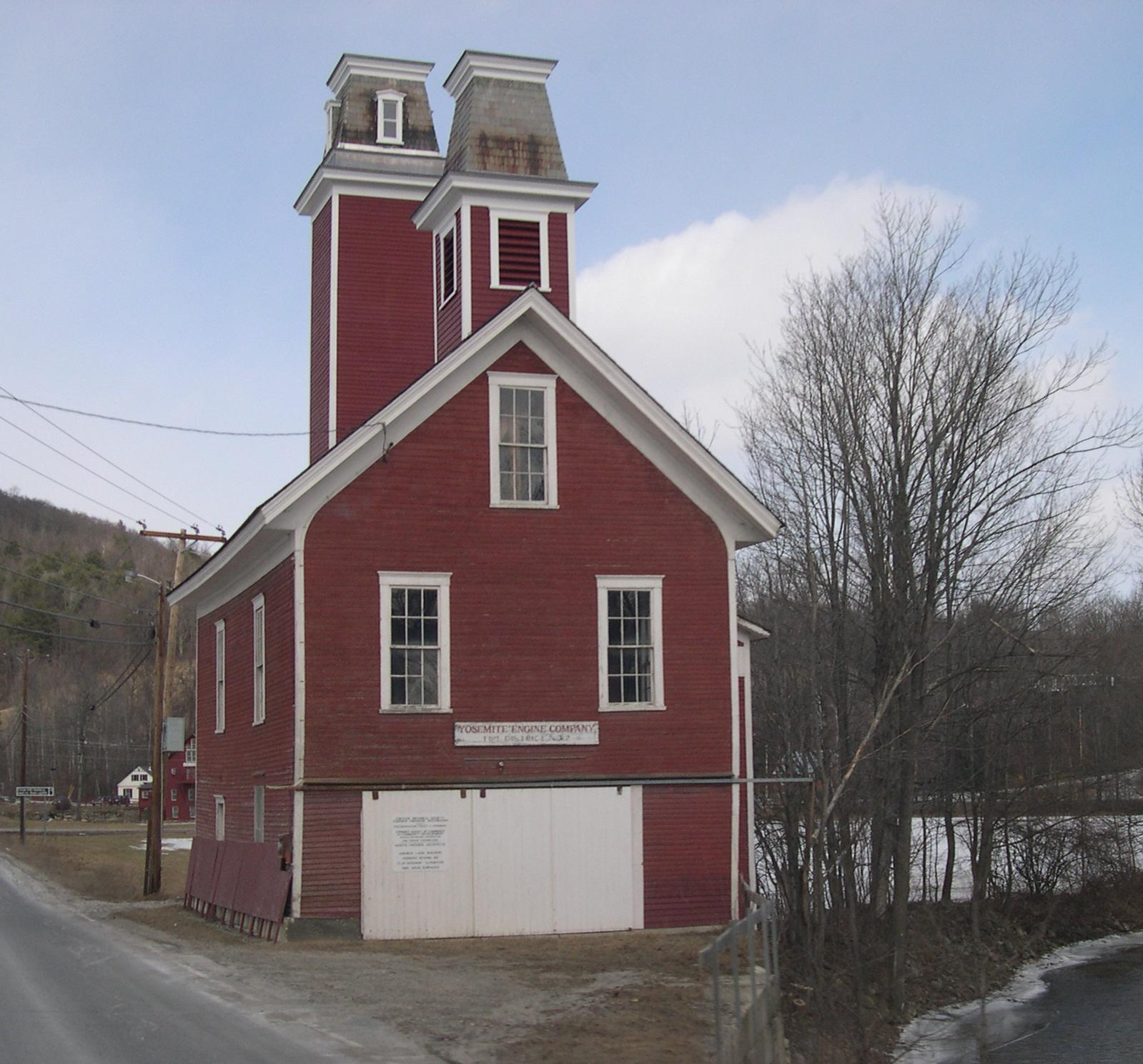
Yosemite Engine Company
