= Bibliography of American Civil War Confederate military unit histories =

The following list is a bibliography of American Civil War Confederate military unit histories and are generally available through inter-library loan. More details on each book are available at WorldCat. For an overall national view, see Bibliography of the American Civil War. For histories of the Union, see Bibliography of American Civil War Union military unit histories. For a guide to web sources see: Carter, Alice E.; Jensen, Richard. The Civil War on the Web: A Guide to the Very Best Sites—Completely Revised and Updated (2003).

== Confederate States Army ==
- Bible, Donahue. From Persia to Piedmont: Life and Death in Vaughn's Brigade. Mohawk, Tennessee: Dodson Creek Publishers, 1995.
- Crute, Jr., Joseph J. Units of the Confederate States Army, 2nd edition. Gaithersburg, Maryland: Olde Soldier Books, 1987.
- Donnelly, Ralph W. The Confederate States Marine Corps: The Rebel Leathernecks. Shippensburg, Pennsylvania: White Mane Publishing Company, Inc., 1989. ISBN 0-942597-13-3.
- Elliott, Charles Pinckney. Elliott's Brigade: How It Held the Crater and Saved Petersburg. Savannah, Georgia: Review Print Co., 1900.
- Oates, Stephen B. Confederate Cavalry West of the River. Austin, Texas: University of Texas Press, 1961.
- Radley, Kenneth. Rebel Watchdog: The Confederate States Army Provost Guard. Baton Rouge, Louisiana: Louisiana State University Press, 1989.
- Sellmeyer, Deryl. Jo Shelby's Brigade Iron Brigade. Gretna, Louisiana: Pelican, 2007.
- Wert, Jeffry D. A Brotherhood of Valor: The Common Soldiers of the Stonewall Brigade, C.S.A., and the Iron Brigade, U.S.A. New York: Simon & Schuster, 1999. ISBN 0-684-82435-3.
- Weinert, Jr., Richard P. The Confederate Regular Army. Shippensburg, PA: White Mane Publishing, 1991, ISBN 978-0-942597-27-1.

=== Field Armies ===
- Hall, Martin H. The Confederate Army of New Mexico. Austin, Texas: Presidial Press, 1978.
- McMurry, Richard M. Two Great Rebel Armies: An Essay in Confederate Military History. Chapel Hill, North Carolina: University of North Carolina Press, 1989. ISBN 0-8078-1819-4.

==== Army of Northern Virginia ====
- Bartholomees, Jr., J. Boone. Buff Facings and Gilt Buttons: Staff and Headquarters Operations in the Army of Northern Virginia, 1861–1865. Columbia, South Carolina: University of South Carolina Press, 1998.
- Conner, Albert Z. and Chris Mackowski. Seizing Destiny: The Army of the Potomac's “Valley Forge”. Savas Beatie, LLC, 2013. ISBN 978-1-61121-156-6.
- Dower, J. Tracy. Lee's Miserables: Life in the Army of Northern Virginia from the Wilderness to Appomattox. Chapel Hill, North Carolina: University of North Carolina Press, 1998. ISBN 0-8078-2392-9.
- Dunlop, W.S. Lee's Sharpshooters; or, The Forefront of Battle. Dayton, Ohio: Morningside Bookshop, 1982.
- Glatthaar, Joseph T. General Lee's Army: From Victory to Collapse. New York: Free Press, 2008. ISBN 978-0-684-82787-2.
- Glatthaar, Joseph T. Soldiering in the Army of Northern Virginia: A Statistical Portrait of the Troops Who Served under Robert E. Lee. Chapel Hill, North Carolina: University of North Carolina Press, 2011. ISBN 978-0-8078-3492-3.
- Gordon, George H. History of the Campaigns of the Army of Northern Virginia. Boston, Massachusetts: Houghton, Osgood, and Company, 1880.
- Hardy, Michael C. General Lee's Immortals: The Battles and Campaigns of the Branch-Lane Brigade in the Army of Northern Virginia, 1861-1865. Savas Beatie, 2018. ISBN 978-1-61121-362-1.
- Krick, Robert K. The Smoothbore Volley That Doomed the Confederacy: The Death of Stonewall Jackson and Other Chapters on the Army of Northern Virginia. Baton Rouge, Louisiana: Louisiana State University Press, 2002.
- Longacre, Edward G. Lee's Cavalrymen: A History of the Mounted Forces of the Army of Northern Virginia. Mechanicsburg, Pa.: Stackpole Books, 2002. ISBN 0-8117-0898-5.
- Power, J. Tracy. Lee's Miserables: Life in the Army of Northern Virginia from the Wilderness to Appomattox. Chapel Hill, North Carolina: University of North Carolina Press, 1998. ISBN 0-8078-2392-9.
- Ray, Fred L. Shock Troops of the Confederacy: The Sharpshooter Battalions of the Army of Northern Virginia. Asheville, North Carolina: CFS Press, 2006.
- Schenck, Martin. Up Came Hill: The Story of the Light Division and its Leaders. Harrisburg, Pennsylvania: Stackpole, 1958.
- Trout, Robert J. Galloping Thunder: The Stuart Horse Artillery Battalion. Mechanicsburg, Pennsylvania: Stockpole Books, 2002.
- Wert, Jeffry D. A Glorious Army: Robert E. Lee's Triumph 1862–1863. New York: Simon & Schuster, 2011. ISBN 978-1-4165-9334-8.

==== Army of Tennessee ====
- Connelly, Thomas L. Army of the Heartland: The Army of Tennessee, 1861 – 1862. Baton Rouge, Louisiana: Louisiana State University Press, 1967. ISBN 0-8071-0404-3.
- Connelly, Thomas L. Autumn of Glory: The Army of Tennessee, 1862 – 1865. Rouge, Louisiana: Louisiana State University Press, 1971. ISBN 0-8071-0445-0.
- Daniel, Larry. Cannoneers in Gray: The Field Artillery of the Army of Tennessee. Tuscaloosa, Alabama: University of Alabama Press, 2005. ISBN 0-8173-5168-X.
- Drake, Edwin L., editor. The Annals of the Army of Tennessee and Early Western History. Guild Bindary Press, no date listed.
- Dunkerly, Robert M. The Confederate Surrender at Greensboro: Final Days of the Army of Tennessee, April 1865. Jefferson, North Carolina: McFarland & Company, Inc., 2013. ISBN 978-0-7864-7362-5.
- Horn, Stanley F. The Army of Tennessee. Norman Oklahoma: University of Oklahoma Press, 1952. ISBN 0-8061-2565-9.
- Ridley, Bromfield. Battles and Sketches of the Army of Tennessee. 1906.

=== Confederate Units ===
- Bridges, David P. Fighting With Jeb Stuart: Major James Breathed and the Confederate Horse Artillery. Breathed Bridges Best, LLC, 2006.
- Jackson, Harry L. First Regiment, Engineer Troops, P.A.C.S.: Robert E. Lee's combat engineers. R.A.E. Design and Pub., 1998.

== Units by state ==
=== Alabama units ===
- Barnard, Harry Vollie. Tattered Volunteers: The Twenty-seventh Alabama Infantry Regiment, C.S.A.. Northport, Alabama: Hermitage Press, 1965.
- Boyd, Charles E. Devil's Den: A History of the 44th Alabama Volunteer Infantry Regiment, Confederate States Army. Charles E. Boyd, 1987.
- Burton, John Michael. Gracie's Alabama Volunteers: The History of the Fifty-Ninth Alabama Volunteer Regiment. Gretna, Louisiana: Pelican Publishing, 2003. ISBN 1-58980-116-4.
- Burton, J. Q. Forty–seventh Regiment Alabama Volunteers, C.S.A. no publisher, no date.
- Cannon, J.P., Noel Crowson, and John V. Brogden. Bloody Banners and Barefoot Boys: A History of the 27th Regiment Alabama Infantry CSA : the Civil War memoirs and diary entries of J.P. Cannon, M.D.. Mechanicsburg, Pennsylvania: Burd Street Press, 1997.
- Faust, James P. The Fighting Fifteenth Alabama Infantry: A Civil War History and Roster. Jefferson, North Carolina: McFarland & Company, 2015. ISBN 978-0-7864-9612-9.
- Gracie, Burton. Alabama Volunteers: The History of the Fifty–Ninth Alabama Volunteer Regiment. Gretna, Louisiana: Pelican Publishing Co., 2003.
- Green, Arthur E. Gracie's Pride: The 43rd Alabama Infantry Volunteers. Mechanicsburg, Pennsylvania: Burd Street Press, 2001.
- Green, Arthur E. Too Little Too Late: Compiled Military Records of the 63rd Alabama infantry CSA with rosters of some companies of the 89th, 94th, and 95th Alabama Militia CSA. Heritage Books, 2001.
- Green, Linda L. First, for the Duration: The Story of the Eighth Alabama Infantry, C. S. A. Heritage Books, 2009.
- Griffin, Ronald G. The 11th Alabama Volunteer Regiment in the Civil War. Jefferson, North Carolina: McFarland & Company, Inc., 2008. ISBN 978-0-7864-7158-4.
- Hoole, William Stanley. History of the Forty–sixth Alabama Regiment Volunteer Infantry, 1862–1865. University, Alabama: Confederate Publishing Company, 1985.
- Hurst, Marshall B. History of the Fourteenth Regiment Alabama Volunteers. Richmond, Virginia: no publisher listed, 1863.
- Jones, Edgar W. History of the 18th Alabama Regiment. Mountain Brook, Alabama; privately published, 1994.
- Laboda, Lawrence. From Selma to Appomattox: The History of the Jeff Davis Artillery. Shippensburg, Pennsylvania: White Mane Publishing Company, 1994.
- Laine, J. Gary and Morris M. Penny. Law's Alabama Brigade in the War between the Union and the Confederacy. Shippensburg, Pennsylvania: White Mane, 1996.
- McMorries, Edward Young. History of the First Regiment, Alabama Volunteer Infantry, C.S.A. Montgomery, Alabama: Brown Printing Co., 1904.
- Oates, William C. The War Between the Union and the Confederacy: A History of the 15th Alabama Regiment. New York: Neale Publishing Co., 1905.
- Shaver, Lewellyn. A History of the Sixtieth Alabama Regiment, Gracie's Alabama Brigade. Montgomery, Alabama: Barrett & Brown, 1867.
- Stocker, Jeffrey D., ed. From Huntsville to Appomattox: R. T. Coles's History of 4th Regiment, Alabama Volunteer Infantry, C.S.A., Army of Northern Virginia. Knoxville, Tennessee: University of Tennessee Press, 2005. ISBN 0-87049-924-6.
- Thompson, Illne D. and Wilbur E. Thompson. The Seventeenth Alabama Infantry: A Regimental History and Roster. Heritage Books, 2001.
- Walker, James Harmon and Robert Curren. Those Gallant Men of the Twenty-Eighth Alabama Confederate Infantry Regiment. Heritage Books, 1997.
- Willett, Elbert D. History of Company B (Originally Pickens Planters) 40th Alabama Regiment, Confederate States Army, 1862 to 1865. Northport, Alabama: Colonial Press, 1963
- Zorn, William A. Hold at All Hazards: The Story of the 29th Alabama Infantry Regiment, 1861–1865. W.A. Zorn, 1987.

=== Arkansas units ===
- Allen, Desmund Walt. First Arkansas Mounted Rifles. Conway, Arkansas: published by the author, 1988.
- Barnhill, Sr., Floyd R. and Calvin L. Collier. The Fighting Fifth: Pat Cleburne's Cutting Edge: The Fifth Arkansas Regiment, C.S.A.. Jonsboro, Arkansas: no publisher listed, no date.
- Bass Ronald R. History of the Thirty–first Arkansas Confederate Infantry. Conway, Arkansas: Conway Research, 1996.
- Collier, Calvin L. First In–Last Out: The Capitol Guards, Ark. Brigade. Little Rock, Arkansas: Pioneer Press, 1961.
- Collier, Calvin L. "They'll Do To Tie To!": The Story of the Third Regiment, Arkansas Infantry, C.S.A. Little Rock, Arkansas: Eagle Press, 1988.
- Collier, Calvin L. The War Child's Children: The Story of the Third Regiment Arkansas Cavalry. Little Rock, Arkansas: Pioneer Press, 1965.
- Dacus, Robert H. Reminiscences of Company "H", First Arkansas Mounted Volunteers. Dardanelle, Arkansas: 1897.
- Gammage, W.L. The Camp, The Bivouac, and The Battlefield, being a history of the Fourth Arkansas Regiment from its first organization down to the present date; its campaigns and its battles, with an occasional reference to the current events of the times, including biographical sketches of tis field officers, and others of the "old brigade". Little Rock, Arkansas: Southern Press, 1958.
- Hammock, John C. With Honor Untarnished: The Story of the First Arkansas Infantry Regiment, Confederate States Army. Little Rock, Arkansas: Pioneer Press, 1961.
- Leeper, Wesley T. Rebels Valiant: Second Arkansas Mounted Rifles (Dismounted). Little Rock, Arkansas: Pioneer Press, 1964.
- Rushing, Anthony C. Ranks of honor: a regimental history of the 11th Arkansas Infantry Regiment and Poe's Cavalry Battalion, C.S.A., 1861–1865. Eagle Press of Little Rock, 1990.

=== Florida units ===
- (no author listed) Adventures of the Marion Hornets, Co. H, 7th Regt. Fla. Vols. Knoxville, Tennessee: published by the author, 1863.
- Carlson, Charlie. The First Florida Cavalry Regiment, CSA. New Smyrna, Florida: Luthers, 1999.
- Florida Department of Military Affairs. Florida Soldiers: CSA 2nd, 5th, 8th Florida Infantry. State Arsenal, St. Francis Barracks, Florida, 1989.
- Hillhouse, Don. Heavy Artillery and Light Infantry: A History of the 1st Florida Special Battalion and 10th Infantry Regiment, C.S.A. Jacksonville, Florida: published by the author, 1992.
- Loderhouse, Gary. Far, Far from Home: The Ninth Florida Regiment in the Confederate States Army. Carmel, Indiana: Guild Press, 1999.
- Sheppard, Jonathan C. By the Noble Daring of Her Sons: The Florida Brigade of the Army of the Tennessee. Tuscaloosa, Alabama: University of Alabama press, 2012. ISBN 978-0-8173-1707-2.
- Waters, Zack C. and James C. Edmonds. A Small but Spartan Band: The Florida Brigade in Lee's Army of Northern Virginia. Tuscaloosa, Alabama: University of Alabama Press.

=== Georgia units ===
- Adamson, Augustus P. Brief History of the Thirtieth Georgia Regiment. no publisher listed, 1912.
- Dameron, Dave. Benning's Brigade, Vol. I: A History and Roster of the Fifteenth Georgia. Spartansburg, South Carolina: The Reprint Co., 1997.
- Duncan, Alexander McC., comp. Roll of Officers and Members of the Georgia Hussars and of the Cavalry Commands of Which the Hussars Are a Continuation, with a Historical Sketch Relating Facts Showing the Origin and Necessity of Rangers or Mounted Men in the Colony of Georgia from Date of Its Founding. Savannah, Georgia: The Morning News, 1906.
- Hoole, William S. and Martha DuB. Hoole, editors. Historical Sketches of Barton's (Later Stovall's) Georgia Brigade, Army of Tennessee, C.S.A. University, Alabama: Confederate Publishing, 1984.
- Scaife, William Robert and William Harris Bragg. Joe Brown's Pets: The Georgia Militia, 1861–1865. Macon, Georgia: Mercer University Press, 2004.

==== Artillery ====
- Fisher, Garry D. and Waters, Zack C. The Damnedest Set of Fellows: A History of Georgia's Cherokee Artillery. Macon, Georgia: Mercer University Press 2020.
- Jones, Jr., Charles C. Historical Sketch of the Chatham Artillery during the Confederate War for Independence. Albany, New York: 1867.
- Speicher, James L. The Sumter Flying Artillery: A Civil War History of the Eleventh Battalion Georgia Light Artillery. Gretna, Louisiana: Pelican Publishing Company, Inc., 2009. ISBN 9781589807167.

==== Cavalry ====
- Cavander, Michael Bowers. The First Georgia Cavalry in the Civil War: A History and Roster. Jefferson, North Carolina: McFarland & Company, Inc., Publishers, 2016. ISBN 978-0-7864-9912-0.
- Coffman, Richard M. Going Back the Way They Came: The Philips Georgia Legion Cavalry Battalion. Macon, Georgia: Mercer University Press, 2011. ISBN 978-0-88146-187-9.
- Daiss, Timothy. In the Saddle: Exploits of the 5th Georgia Cavalry. Atglen, Pennsylvania: Schiffer Publishing, 1999.
- Howard, Wiley C. Sketch of the Cobb Legion Cavalry and Some Scense and Incidents Remembered. Atlanta, George: Atlanta Camp 159, Sons of Confederate Veterans, 1901.
- Mesic, Harriet Bey. Cobb's Legion Cavalry: A History and Roster of the Ninth Georgia Volunteers in the Civil War. Jefferson, North Carolina: McFarland & Company, 2011. ISBN 978-0-7864-6432-6.

==== Infantry ====
- Adamson, A.P. Brief History of the 30th Georgia Regiment. Rex, Georgia: The Mills Printing Co., 1912.
- Bowers, Jr., William A. The 47th Georgia Volunteer Infantry Regiment. Global Author Press, 2013.
- Calhoun, William L. History of the 42d Regiment, Georgia Volunteers, Confederate States Army, Infantry. Sisson Print., 1900.
- Cantrell, Oscar Alexander. Sketches of the First Regiment Georgia Volunteers together with the History of the 56th Regiment Georgia Volunteers, to January 1, 1864. Atlanta, Georgia: Intelligencer Presses, 1864.
- Churchwell, L. Harris. Seeking Glory: The Men and the Battles of the Twelfth Georgia Regiment. TVA Publishing Company, 2013. ISBN 978-1935921431.
- Coffman, Richard M. and Kurt D. Graham. To Honor These Men: A History of the Phillips Georgia Legion Infantry Battalion. Macon, Georgia: Mercer University Press, 2007.
- Cone, Daniel. Last to Join the Fight: The 66th Georgia Infantry. Macon, Georgia: Mercer University Press, 2014. ISBN 978-0-88146-475-7.
- Croom, Wendell. The War History of Company "C", (Beauregard Volunteers), Sixth Georgia Regiment (Infantry), with a Graphic Account of Each Member. Fort Valley, Georgia: Advertiser, 1879.
- Dameron, J. David. Benning's Brigade: A history and roster of the Second, Seventeenth, and Twentieth Georgia Volunteer Infantry Regiments. Heritage Books, 2005. ISBN 9780788431753.
- Dewberry, Ray. History of the 14th Georgia Infantry Regiment. Heritage Books, 2009. ISBN 9781585499137.
- Fox III, John J. Red Clay to Richmond: Trial of the 35th Georgia Infantry Regiment, C. S. A. Winchester, Virginia: Angle Valley Press, 2004.
- Harper, F. Mikell. 2nd Georgia Infantry Regiment, 1861–1865. Indigo Custom Publishing LLC.
- Herring, Dorothy Holland. Company C of the Twenty-second Georgia Infantry Regiment in Confederate Service. D.H. Herring, 2000.
- Martin, George Winston. "I Will Give Them One More Shot": Ramsey's 1st Regiment Georgia Volunteers. Macon, Georgia: Mercer University Press, 2010. ISBN 978-0-88146-219-7.
- Mesic, Harriet Bey. Cobb's Legion Cavalry: A History and Roster of the Ninth Georgia Volunteers in the Civil War. Jefferson, North Carolina: McFarland Publishers, 2009.
- Murray, Allan J. South Georgia Rebels: the True Wartime Experiences of the Twenty–Sixth Regiment Georgia Volunteer Infantry, Lawton–Gordon–Evans Brigade, Confederate States Army, 1861–1865. St. Mary's Georgia: published by author, 1976.
- Parrish, James W. Wiregrass to Appomattox: The Untold Story of the 50th Georgia Infantry Regiment, CSA. Angle Valley Press, 2008.
- Thomas, Henry W. History of the Doles–Cook Brigade. 1903.
- Walker, Scott. Hell's Broke Loose in Georgia: Survival in a Civil War Regiment. (57th Georgia Infantry Regiment). University of Georgia Press, 2007.
- White, Gregory C. This Most Bloody and Cruel Drama: A History of the 31st Georgia Infantry. Baltimore, Maryland: Butternut and Blue, 1997.
- Wilkinson, Warren and Woodworth, Steven E. A Scythe of Fire: A Civil War Story of The Eighth Georgia Infantry Regiment. New York, NY: Harper Collins, 2002. ISBN 0-380-97752-4.
- Zwemer, John. For Home and the Southland: A History of the 48th Georgia Infantry Regiment. Baltimore, Maryland: Butternut & Blue, 1999. ISBN 9780935523737.

==== Sharpshooters units ====
- Brown, Russell K. Our Connection with Savannah: A History of the 1st Battalion Georgia Sharpshooters. Macon, Georgia: Mercer University Press, 2004.

==== State troops ====
- Bragg, William Harris. Joe Brown's Army: The Georgia State Line, 1862–1865. Macon, Georgia: Mercer University Press, 1987.

=== Kentucky units ===
- Brown, Dee Alexander. The Bold Cavaliers: Morgan's 2nd Kentucky Cavalry Raiders. Philadelphia, Pennsylvania: J.B. Lippincott & Co., 1959.
- Davis, William C. The Orphan Brigade: The Kentucky Confederates Who Couldn't Go Home. New York: Doubleday, 1980.
- George, Henry. History of the 3d, 7th, 8th, and 12th Kentucky, C. S. A. Louisville, Kentucky: C. T. Dearing Printing Company, 1911.
- Thompson, Edward. History of the Orphan Brigade. Louisville, Kentucky: Leslie Thompson, 1895.

=== Louisiana units ===
- Bergeron, Jr., Arthur W. Guide to Louisiana Confederate Military Units, 1861-1865. Baton Rouge, Louisiana: Louisiana State University Press, 1989.
- Booth, Andrew. Records of Louisiana Confederate Soldiers and Louisiana Confederate Commands, three volumes. New Orleans, Louisiana: no publisher listed, 1920.
- Brooks, Thomas Walter and Michael Dan Jones. Lee's Foreign Legion: A History of the 10th Louisiana Infantry. Gravenhusrt on: T.W. Brooks, 1995.
- DeCuir, Randy "Atchafalaya Guards: Of Avoyelles and Pointe Coupee Parishes. Louisiana answers the call at Gettysburg and beyond"Avoyelles Publications 2012
- DeCuir, Randy Stafford Guards: Braves of the Bayou: The story of the distinguished Avoyelles and Rapides men of Company B of the 9th Louisiana Infantry Avoyelles Publications, 2013 ISBN 1493505815
- Gannon, James P. Irish Rebels, Confederate Tigers: A History of the 6th Louisiana Volunteers, 1861–1865. Campbell, California: Savas, 1998.
- Gremillion, Nelson. Company G, 1st Regiment Louisiana Cavalry, C.S.A.: A Narrative. University of Southwestern Louisiana, 1986.
- Hall, Winchester. The Story of the Twenty–Sixth Louisiana Infantry in the Service of the Confederate States. No place of publication: no publisher listed, no date listed.
- Hughes, Jr., Nathaniel Cheairs. The Pride of the Confederate Artillery: The Washington Artillery in the Army of the Tennessee. Baton Rouge, Louisiana: Louisiana State University Press, 1997.
- Jones, Terry L. Lee's Tigers: The Louisiana Infantry in the Army of Northern Virginia. Baton Rouge, Louisiana: Louisiana State University Press, 1987.
- Mingus, Scott L. The Louisiana Tigers in the Gettysburg Campaign, June–July 1863. Baton Rouge, Louisiana: Louisiana State University Press, 2009.
- Salling, Stuart. Louisianians in the Western Confederacy: The Adams–Gibson Brigade in the Civil War. Jefferson, North Carolina: McFarland, 2010. ISBN 978-0-7864-4218-8.
- Scriber, Terry G. and Theresa Arnold-Scriber. The Fourth Louisiana Battalion in the Civil War: A History and Roster. Jefferson, North Carolina: McFarland & Company, Inc., 2013. ISBN 978-0-7864-7520-9.
- Schrenckengost, Gary. The First Louisiana Special Battalion: Wheat's Tigers in the Civil War. Jefferson, North Carolina: McFarland & Company, 2017. ISBN 978-1-4766-7238-0.
- Tunner, William H. A Southern Record: the History of the Third Regiment Louisiana Infantry. Baton Rouge, Louisiana: no publisher listed, 1866.

=== Maryland units ===
- Driver, Jr., Robert J. First and Second Maryland Cavlary, C.S.A.. Charlottesville, Virginia: Rockbridge Publishing, 1999.
- Goldsborough, W. W. The Maryland Line in the Confederate Army, 1861 – 1865. Baltimore, Maryland: Guggenheimer, Weil & Co., 1900.
- Rich, Edward R. Comrades Four, Neale Publishing Co., New York 1907 (1st Maryland Cavalry C.S.A.)

=== Mississippi units ===
- (no author listed) A Historical Sketch of the Quitman Guards, Company E, Sixteenth Mississippi Regiment. New Orleans, Louisiana: no publisher listed, 1866.
- (no author listed) Lamar Rifles: A History of Company G, Eleventh Mississippi Regiment, C.S.A. Roanoke Virginia: Stone Print, 1903.
- Brown, Maud Morrow. The University Greys: Company A, Eleventh Mississippi Regiment, Army of Northern Virginia, 1861–1865. Garrett and Massie, incorporated, 1940.
- Burford, Thomas P., Thomas H. Chilton, and Ben Price. Lamar Rifles: A History of Company G, Eleventh Mississippi Regiment, C.S.A., with the Official Roll, Giving Each Man's Record from the Time of Enlistment to the Twenty Ninth March, Eighteen Hundred and Sixty–five; Individual and Company Sketches; Incidents of the Camp, the March, and the Battlefield, and Is Intended to Be of Especial Interest to the Friends of Members of This Company, Which Was Popularly Known as the "Lamar Rifles" Which Served in the Army of Northern Virginia From May 1861 to April 1865. Roanoke, Virginia: The Stone Publishing Company, 1902.
- Evans, Robert G. The Sixteenth Mississippi Infantry: Civil War Letters and Reminiscences. Jackson, Mississippi: University Press of Mississippi, 2003.
- Harris, W.M., comp. Movements of the Confederate Army in Virginia and the Part Taken Therein by the Nineteenth Mississippi Regiment. From the Diary of Gen. N.H. Harris. Duncanby, Mississippi: no publisher listed, 1901.
- Hopkins, Donald A. The Little Jeff: The Jeff Davis Legion, Cavalry, Army of Northern Virginia. Shippensburg, Pennsylvania: White Mane, 1999.
- Love, Thomas Neely and H. Grady Howell. To Live and Die in Dixie: A History of the Third Regiment Mississippi Volunteer Infantry, C.S.A.. Chickasaw Bayou Press, 1991
- Massey, Steve. Foremost: The Fourth Mississippi Infantry in the Civil War. Createspace, 2013.
- McNeily, J. S. Barksdale's Mississippi Brigade at Gettysburg: Most Magnificent Charge of the War. Gaithersburg, Mississippi: Olde Soldier Books, Inc., 1987.
- Rietti, J. C. History of the Mississippi Rifles, 10th Mississippi Regiment. Glasgow: W. Anderson Fadie, no date.
- Stubbs, Steven Howard. Duty Honor Valor: The Story of the Eleventh Mississippi Infantry Regiment. Dancing Rabbit Press, 2000.
- Williams, T. P. The Mississippi Brigade of Brig. Gen. Joseph R. Davis: A Geographical Account of Its Campaigns and a Biographical Account of Its Personalities, 1861–1865. Dayton, Ohio: Morningside House, Inc., 1999.
- Williamson, David. The Third Battalion Mississippi Infantry and the 45th Mississippi Regiment: A Civil War History. Jefferson, North Carolina: McFarland & Company, Inc., 2004. ISBN 0-7864-1649-1.
- Wynne, Ben. A Hard Trip: A History of the 15th Mississippi Infantry, CSA. Macon, Georgia: Mercer University Press, 2010. ISBN 0-86554-806-4.

=== Missouri units ===
- Bartels, Carolyn M. The Forgotten Men: Missouri State Guard. Shawnee Mission, Kansas: Two Trails Publishing, 1995.
- Bevier, R. S. History of the First and Second Missouri Confederate Brigades, 1861–1865. St. Louis, Missouri: Bryan, Brand & Company, 1879.
- Gottschalk, Philip. In Deadly Earnest: The History of the First Missouri Brigade, C.S.A. Columbia, Missouri: Missouri River Press, Inc., 1991. ISBN 0-9631136-1-5.
- Haimerl, David L. Clarckson's Battalion C.S.A.: A Brief History and Roster. Independence, Missouri: Two Trails, 2005.
- McGhee, James E. Guide to Missouri Confederate Units, 1861–1865. Fayetteville, Arkansas: University of Arkansas Press, 2008.
- Tucker, Phillip T. The South's Finest: The First Missouri Confederate Brigade from Pea Ridge to Vicksburg. Shippensburg, Pennsylvania: White Mane Publishing Company, Inc., 1993. ISBN 0-942597-31-1.
- Tucker, Philip Thomas. Westerners in Gray: The Men and Missions of the Elite Fifth Missouri Infantry Regiment. Jefferson, North Carolina: McFarland & Company, 1995. ISBN 978-0-7864-3112-0.

=== North Carolina units ===
- Casstevens, Frances H. Clingman's Brigade in the Confederacy, 1862–1865. Jefferson, North Carolina: McFarland & Company, 2002.
- Casstevens, Francis H. The 28th North Carolina Infantry: A Civil War History and Roster. Jefferson, North Carolina: McFarland & Company, 2008.
- Chapman, Craig S. More Terrible Than Victory: North Carolina's Bloody Bethel Regiment, 1861–1865.
- Clark, Walter ed., Histories of the Several Regiments and Battalions from North Carolina in the Great War 1861–65. Goldsboro, North Carolina: Nash Brothers, 1901.
- Crow, Vernon H. Storm in the Mountains: Thomas' Confederate Legion of Cherokee Indians and Mountaineers. Cherokee, North Carolina: Press of the Museum of the Cherokee Indian, 1982.
- Day, W. A. A True History of Company I, 49th Regiment, North Carolina Troops, in the Great Civil War Between North and South. Newton, North Carolina: Enterprise Job Office, 1893.
- Gillispie, Joseph. Cape Fear Confederates: The 18th North Carolina Regiment in the Civil War. Jefferson, North Carolina: McFarland & Company, Inc., 2012. ISBN 978-0-7864-4847-0.
- Girvan, Jeffrey M. The 55th North Carolina in the Civil War: A History and Roster. Jefferson, North Carolina: McFarland & Company, Inc., 2013. ISBN 978-0-7864-7503-2.
- Gragg, Rod. Covered With Glory: The 26th North Carolina Infantry at the Battle of Gettysburg. New York: Harper Collins, 2000.
- Hadden, R. Lee. Fourth Regiment North Carolina State Troops, 1861–1865. published by the author, 1999.
- Hardy, Michael C. The Fifty-Eighth North Carolina Troops: Tar Heels in the Army of Tennessee. Jefferson, North Carolina: McFarland & Company, 2010. ISBN 978-0-7864-3438-1.
- Hardy, Michael C.. The Thirty–seventh North Carolina Troops: Tar Heels in the Army of Northern Virginia. Jefferson, North Carolina: McFarland & Company, 2003. ISBN 978-0-7864-4580-6.
- Hardy, Michael C. General Lee's Immortals: The Battles and Campaigns of the Branch-Lane Brigade in the Army of Northern Virginia, 1861-1865. Savas Beatie, 2018. ISBN 978-1-61121-362-1.
- Harrell, Roger H. The 2nd North Carolina Cavalry. Jefferson, North Carolina: McFarland, 2004. ISBN 0-7864-1777-3.
- Harris, J. S. Historical Sketches of the Seventh Regiment North Carolina Troops. Mooresville, North Carolina, 1893.
- Hartley, Chris J. Stuart's Tarheels: James B. Gordon and His North Carolina Cavalry in the Civil War. New York: McFarland & Company, 2011. ISBN 978-0-7864-6364-0.
- Hess, Earl J. Lee's Tar Heels: The Pettigrew–Kirkland–MacRae Brigade. Chapel Hill, North Carolina: University of North Carolina Press, 2002. ISBN 0-8078-2687-1.
- Iobst, Richard W. The Bloody Sixth: The Sixth North Carolina Regiment Confederate States of America. Durham, North Carolina: Christian Publishing Company, 1965.
- Jones, Carroll C. The 25th North Carolina Troops in the Civil War: History and Roster of a Mountain–Bred Regiment. Jefferson, North Carolina: McFarland Publishers, 2009. ISBN 978-0-7864-9555-9.
- Kenan, Thomas S., comp. Sketch of the Forty–Third Regiment North Carolina Troops (Infantry). Raleigh, North Carolina: no publisher listed, 1895.
- Mills, George H. History of the 16th North Carolina (Originally Sixth N.C.) Regiment in the Civil War. Rutherfordton, North Carolina: no publisher listed, 1901.
- Raiford, Neil Hunter. The 4th North Carolina Cavalry in the Civil War. Jefferson, North Carolina: McFarland & Company, Inc., 2003. ISBN 978-0-7864-2956-1.
- Ray, Clyde. Across the Dark River: The Odyssey of the 56th N.C. Infantry in the American Civil War. Parkway Publishers, 1996. ISBN 978-1-8879-0504-6.
- Ray, Neill W. Sketch of the Sixth Regiment, N.C. State Troops (Infantry). no place: no publisher listed, no date.
- Sherrill, Jr., Lee W. The 21st North Carolina Infantry: A Civil War History, with a Roster of Officers. Jefferson, North Carolina: McFarland & Company, 2015. ISBN 978-0-7864-7626-8.
- Smith W. A. The Anson Guards: Company C, Fourteenth Regiment North Carolina Volunteers 1861–1865. Charlotte, North Carolina: Stone Publishing Company, 1914.
- Underwood, George C. History of the Twenty–Sixth Regiment of North Carolina Troops in the Great War 1861–'65. Goldsboro, North Carolina: Nash Brothers, 1901.
- Venner, William Thomas. The 11th North Carolina Infantry in the Civil War: A History and Roster. Jefferson, North Carolina: McFarland & Company, 2015. ISBN 978-0-7864-9515-3.
- Venner, William Thomas. The 30th North Carolina Infantry in the Civil War: A History and Roster. Jefferson, North Carolina: McFarland & Company, 2018. ISBN 978-1-4766-6240-4.
- Wall, H.C. Historical Sketch of the Pee Dee Guards (Co. D, 23d N.C. Regiment) from 1861 to 1865. Raleigh, North Carolina: Edwards, Broughton, 1876.
- Weaver, Jeffrey C. The 5th and 7th Battalions North Carolina Cavalry and the 6th North Carolina Cavalry (65th North Carolina State Troops). Lynchburg, Virginia: H.E. Howard, 1995.

=== Oklahoma units ===
- Gaines, W. Craig. The Confederate Cherokees: John Drew's Regiment of Mounted Rifles. Baton Rouge, Louisiana: Louisiana State University Press, 1989. ISBN 0-8071-1488-X.

=== South Carolina units ===
- Andrews, W.J. Sketch of Company K, 23rd South Carolina Volunteers, In the Civil War, From 1862–1865. Richmond, Virginia: Whittet and Shepperson, no date listed.
- Baxley, Neil. No Prouder Fate: The Story of the 11th South Carolina Volunteer Infantry. AuthorHouse, 2005. ISBN 9781420829983.
- Brunson, Joseph Woods. Pee Dee Light Artillery of Maxcy Gregg's (Later Samuel McGowan's) Brigade, First South Carolina Volunteers (Infantry) C.S.A. Winston-Salem, North Carolina: Stewart Printers, 1927.
- Caldwell, J.F.J. The History of a Brigade of South Carolinians, Known First As Gregg's and Subsequently As McGowan's Brigade. Philadelphia, Pennsylvania: King & Baird, 1866.
- Clary, James B. A History of the 15th South Carolina Infantry, 1861–1864. Columbia, South Carolina: South Carolina Dept. of Archives and History, 2007.
- Coker, James L. History of Company G. Ninth S.C. Regiment, Infantry, S.C. Army and of Company E, Sixth S.C. Regiment, Infantry, S.C. Army. Charleston, South Carolina: Walker, Evans & Cogswell Company, 1899.
- Davis, Sam B. A History of the 3rd South Carolina Volunteer Infantry Battalion (James Battalion): 1861–1865. Wilmington, North Carolina: Broadfoot Publishing Company, 2009.
- Dickett, D. Augustus. History of Kershaw's Brigade, with a complete roll of companies, biographical sketches, incidents, anecdotes, etc.. Newberry, South Carolina: E. H. Aull, 1899.
- Edwards, W.H. A Condensed History of Seventeenth Regiment S.C.V.C.S.A.: From Its Organization to the Close of the War. Columbia, South Carolina: R.I. Bryan Co., 1908.
- Emanuel, S. A Historical Sketch of the Georgetown Rifle Guards and of Co. A of the 10th Regiment, So. Ca. Volunteers in the Army of the Confederate States. no publisher listed, no date.
- Emerson, W. Eric. Sons of Privilege: The Charleston Light Dragoons in the Civil War. Columbia, South Carolina: University of South Carolina Press, 2005. ISBN 1-5700-3592-X.
- Haimerl, David L. Clarkson's Battalion C.S.A.: A Brief History and Roster. Independence, Missouri: Two Trails, 2005.
- Hoyt, James A. The Palmetto Riflemen, Co. B, Fourth Regiment, S.C. Vols. Co. C, Palmetto Sharpshooters. Greenville, South Carolina: Hoyt and Keys, 1886.
- Izlar, William V. A Sketch of the War Record of the Edisto Rifles, 1861–1865: Company "A", 1st Regiment S.C.V. Infantry, Colonel Johnson Hagood, Provisional Army of the Confederate States, 1861–1862; Company "G", 25th S.C.V. Infantry, Colonel Charles H. Simonton, Confederate States Army, 1862–1865. Columbia, South Carolina: The State Company, 1914.
- Jones, Eugene Walter. Enlisted for the War: The Struggles of the Gallant 24th Regiment, South Carolina Volunteers, Infantry, 1861–1865. Longstreet House, 1997.
- Krick, Robert K. The 14th South Carolina Infantry Regiment of the Gregg–McGowan Brigade. Wilmington, North Carolina: Broadfoot Publishing, 2009.
- Phelps, W. Chris. Charlestonians in War: The Charleston Battalion. Gretna, Louisiana: Pelican Publishing Company, 2004.
- Reid, Jesse W. History of the Fourth Regiment S.C. Volunteers. Greenville, South Carolina: Shannon, 1892.
- Seigler, Robert S. South Carolina's Military Organization During the War Between the States, four volumes. The History Press, 2009.
- Jones, Jr. Eugene W. Enlisted For the War: The Struggle of the Gallant 24th Regiment South Carolina Volunteers, Infantry, 1861-1865. Longstreet House, 1997.
- Wadsworth, Mike. The 13th South Carolina Volunteer Infantry C.S.A. Wilmington, North Carolina: Broadfoot Publishing, 2008.
- Walker, C.I. Rolls and Historical Sketch of the Tenth Regiment, So. Ca. Volunteers, in the Army of the Confederates States. Charleston, South Carolina: Walker, Evans & Cogswell, 1881.
- Wall, Henry C. Historical Sketch of the Pee Dee Guards. Raleigh, North Carolina: Edwards, Broughton, 1876.
- Wyckoff, Mac. A History of the Third South Carolina Infantry, 1861–1865. Fredericksburg, Virginia: Sergeant Kirkland's Museum and Historical Society, 1995.
- Wyckoff, Mac. A history of the Third South Carolina Infantry, 1861–1865. Fredericksburg, Virginia: Sergeant Kirkland's Museum & Historical Society, 1994.

=== Tennessee units ===
- Allen, Williams Gibbs. McKenzie's Fighting Fifth: Questionnaires of Veterans of the 5th Tennessee Cavalry Regiment, Confederate States of America. Rhea County Historical and Genealogical Society, 2001.
- Allen, William G. Reminiscences of William G. Allen: McKenzie's 5th Tennessee Regiment. Rhea County Historical and Genealogical Society, 2000.
- Bishop, Randy. The Tennessee Brigade: A History of the Volunteers of the Army of Northern Virginia. Bloomington, Indiana: Rooftop Publishing, 2007. ISBN 978-1-60008-066-1.
- Booth, Louise. The Beleaguered Forty–First Tennessee. Villa Park, California: D.R. Booth Associates, 1996.
- Carter, W.R. History of the First Regiment of Tennessee Volunteer Cavalry in the Great War of the Rebellion. Knoxville, Tennessee: Gaut-Ogden, 1902.
- Cathey, M. Todd and Gary W. Waddey. "Forward My Brave Boys!": A History of the 11th Tennessee Volunteer Infantry, CSA 1861–1865. Macon, Georgia: Mercer University Press, 2016.
- Cotton, Michael. The Williamson County Cavalry: A History of Company F, Fourth Tennessee Cavalry Regiment, CSA. published by the author, 1994.
- Cross, Charles Wallace. Cry Havoc: A History Of The 49th Tennessee Volunteer Infantry Regiment, 1861–1865. Hillsboro Press, 2004.
- Fleming, James R. Band of Brothers: Company C, Ninth Tennessee Infantry. Shippensburg, Pennsylvania: White Mane Publishing Co., 1996.
- Fleming, James Robert. The Confederate Ninth Tennessee Infantry. Gretna, Louisiana: Pelican Publishing, 2006. ISBN 978-1-58980-331-2.
- Fowler, John D. Mountaineers in Gray: The Nineteenth Tennessee Infantry Regiment, C. S. A. Knoxville, Tennessee: University of Tennessee Press, 2004.
- Gillum, Jamie. The Battle of Perryville and the Sixteenth Tennessee Infantry Regiment: A Re–evaluation. CreateSpace, 2011. ISBN 978-1466345799.
- Jamie Gillum. The History of the Sixteenth Tennessee Volunteer Infantry Regiment: We Were Spoiling for a Fight. CreateSpace, 2011.
- Gleeson, Ed. Rebel Sons of Erin: A Civil War Unit History of the Tenth Tennessee Infantry Regiment (Irish) Confederate States Volunteers. Guild Press of Indiana, 1993.* Guild, George B. A Brief Narrative of the Fourth Tennessee Cavalry Regiment, Wheeler's Corps, Army of Tennessee. Nashville, Tennessee: no publisher listed, 1913.
- Hancock, R. R. Hancock's Diary or A History of the Second Tennessee Cavalry With Sketches of the First and Seventh Battalions. Nashville, Tennessee: Brandon Printing Company, 1887.
- Head, Thomas A. Campaigns and Battles of the Sixteenth Regiment, Tennessee Volunteers, In The War Between The States, With Incidental Sketches of the Part Performed by other Tennessee Troops in the same War, 1861–1865. Nashville, Tennessee: Cumberland Presbyterian Publishing House, 1885.
- Lindsley, John Berrien, ed. The Military Annals of Tennessee, Confederate: Embracing a Review of Military Operations, with Regimental Histories and Memorial Rolls. Nashville, Tennessee, J.M. Lindsley & Company, 1886.
- Loving, Waldon. Coming Like Hell: The Story of the 12th Tennessee Cavalry, Richardson's Brigade, Forrest's Cavalry Corps, Confederate States Army, 1862–1865. Lincoln, Nebraska: iUniverse, 2002. ISBN 0-595-23673-1.
- McMurray, W. J. History of the Twentieth Tennessee Regiment Volunteer Infantry. Nashville, Tennessee: The Publication Committee, 1904.
- Van Eldik, James. From the Flame of Battle to the Fiery Cross: The 3rd Tennessee Infantry with Complete Roster. Yucca Tree Press, 2001.
- Vaughan, A. J. Personal Record of the Thirteenth Regiment, Tennessee Infantry. Memphis, Tennessee: Burke's Book Store, no date listed.
- Venner, William Thomas. The 7th Tennessee Infantry in the Civil War: A History and Roster. Jefferson, North Carolina: McFarland & Company, 2013. ISBN 978-0-7864-7350-2.
- Worsham, W. J. The Old Nineteenth Tennessee Regiment, C.S.A., June, 1861 – April 1865. Knoxville, Tennessee: Press of Paragon Printing Company, 1902.
- Young, J. P. The Seventh Tennessee Cavalry (Confederate): A History. Nashville, Tennessee: 1890.

=== Texas units ===
- (no author listed) A Brief and Condensed History of Parson's Texas Cavalry Brigade, composed of 12th, 19th, 21st Morgan's Battalion, and Pratt's Battery of Artillery of the Confederate States. W. M. Morrison, 1962.
- Anderson, John Q., editor. Campaigning with Parson's Texas Cavalry Brigade, CSA. Hillsboro, Texas: Hill Junior College Press, 1967.
- Bailey, Anne J. Between the Enemy and Texas: Parson's Texas Cavalry in the Civil War. Fort Worth, Texas: Texas Christian University Press, 1989.
- Bailey, Anne J. In the Saddle with the Texans: Day–by–Day with Parsons' Cavalry Brigade, 1862–1865. Abilene, Texas: McWhiney Foundation Press, 2004.
- Barron, Samuel. Lone Star Defenders: A Chronicle of the 3rd Texas Cavalry. New York: Neale Publishing Co., 1908.
- Blessington, Joseph. The Campaigns of Walker's Texas Division. New York: Lang, Little, 1875.
- Bush, Bryan S. Terry's Texas Rangers: The 8th Texas Cavalry. Paducah, Kentucky: Turner Publishing, 2002.
- Carlock, Chuck, with V.M. Owens. History of The Tenth Texas Cavalry (Dismounted) Regiment 1861–1865: "If we ever got whipped, I don't recollect it". North Richfield Hills, Texas: Smithfield Press, 2001.
- Chance, Joseph E. The Second Texas Infantry: From Shiloh to Vicksburg. Austin, Texas: Eakin Press, 1984.
- D'Hamel, Enrique B. The Adventures of a Tenderfoot: History of the Second Regt. Mounted Rifles and Co. G, Thirty–Third Regt. and Capt. Coopwood's Spy Co. and Second Texas in Texas and New Mexico. Waco, Texas: W.M. Morrison, 1914.
- Davis, James Henry, editor. Texans in Gray: A Regimental History of the Eighteenth Texas Infantry, Walker's Texas Division in the Civil War. Tulsa, Oklahoma: Heritage Oak, 1999.
- Debray, Xavier B. A Sketch of the History of Debray's (26th) Regiment of Texas Cavalry. Austin, Texas: Eugene von Boeckmann, 1884.
- Dourglas, James P. Douglas's Texas Battery, C.S.A., ed. by Lucia Rutherford Douglas. Tyler, Texas: Smith County Historical Society, 1966.
- Duaine, Carl L. The Dead Men Wore Boots: An Account of the 32nd Texas Volunteer Cavalry, C.S.A., 1862–1865. Austin, Texas: San Felipe Press, 1966.
- Edgar, Thomas H. History of De Bray's (Twenty–Sixth) Regiment of Texas Cavalry, 1861–1898: Embracing Roster and Casualties. Galveston, Texas: A.A. Finck, 1898.`
- Felmly, Bradford K. and John C. Grady. Suffering to Silence: 29th Texas Cavalry, CSA, Regimental History. Nortex Press, 1975.
- Hale, Douglas. The Third Texas Cavalry in the Civil War. Norman, Oklahoma: University of Oklahoma Press, 1993.
- Hamilton, D.H. History of Company M, First Texas Volunteer Infantry. W.M. Morrison, 1962.
- Hasskarl, Robert A. Waul's Texas Legion, 1862–1865. Ada, Oklahoma: Book Bindery, 1976.
- Hatley, Allen G. The First Texas Legion. Eagle Lake, Texas: Centex Press, 2004.
- Hatley, Allen G. Reluctant Rebels: The Eleventh Texas Cavalry Regiment. Hillsboro, Texas: Hills College, 2006.
- Johannsson, M. Jane. Peculiar Honor: A History of the 28th Texas Cavalry, 1862–1865. Fayetteville, Arkansas: University of Arkansas Press, 1998.
- Lindberg, John R. Granbury's Texas Brigade: Diehard Western Confederates. Baton Rouge, Louisiana: Louisiana State University Press, 2012. ISBN 9780807143476.
- Lowe, Richard. Walker's Texas Division, C.S.A.: Greyhounds of the Trans–Mississippi. Baton Rouge, Louisiana: Louisiana State University, 2004.
- McCaffery, James M. This Band of Heroes: Granbury's Texas Brigade, C.S.A.. College Station, Texas: Texas A&M University Press, 2000.
- McGowen, Stanley S. Horesesweat and Powdersmoke: The First Texas Cavalry in the Civil War. College Station, Texas: Texas A&M University Press, 1999. ISBN 978-1-62349-597-8.
- Noel, Thomas. A Campaign from Santa Fe to the Mississippi; Being a History of the Old Sibley Brigade. Shreveport, Louisiana: Shreveport News, 1865.
- Parsons' Texas Cavalry Brigade Association. A Brief and Condensed History of Parsons' Texas Cavalry Brigade Composed of the Twelfth, Nineteenth, Twenty–First, Morgan's Battalion, and Pratt's Battery of Artillery of the Confederate States. Waxahachie, Texas: J.M. Flemister, 1962.
- Polley, J. B. Hood's Texas Brigade: Its Marches, Its Battles, Its Achievements. New York: The Neale Publishing Company, 1910.
- Reid, Thomas. Spartan Band: Burnett's 13th Texas Cavalry in the Civil War. Denton, Texas: University of North Texas Press, 2005. ISBN 1-57441-189-6
- Schmutz, John F. The Bloody Fifth: The 5th Texas Infantry, Hood's Texas Brigade, Army of Northern Virginia, Vol. 1: Secession to the Suffolk Campaign. Savas Beatie, 2016. ISBN 978-1-61121-204-4.
- Schmutz, John F. The Bloody Fifth: The 5th Texas Infantry Regiment, Hood's Texas Brigade, Army of Northern Virginia, Vol. 2: Gettysburg to Appomattox. Savas Beatie, 2017. ISBN 978-1-61121-334-8.
- Simpson, Harold B. Hood's Texas Brigade: Lee's Grenadier Guard. Waco, Texas: Texian Press, 1970. republished by Landmark Publishing, 1999.
- Spurlin, Charles. West of the Mississippi with Walker's 13th Texas Cavalry Battalion CSA. Hillsboro, Texas: Hill Junior College Press, 1971.
- Weddle, Robert S. Plow–Horse Cavalry: The Caney Creek Boys of the Thirty–fourth Texas. Austin, Texas: Madrona Press, 1974.
- Winkler, A.V. The Confederate Capital and Hood's Texas Brigade. Eugene Von Boeckmann, 1894.
- Wooster, Ralph A. Lone Star Regiments in Gray. Austin, Texas: Eakin Press, 2002.

=== Virginia units ===
- Driver, Jr., Robert J. and Horold E. Howard. 1st Battalion Virginia Infantry, 39th Battalion Virginia Cavalry, 24th Battalion Virginia Partisan Rangers. Lynchburg, Virginia: H. E. Howard, Inc., 1996.
- McDonald, William. A History of the Laurel Brigade, Originally the Ashby Cavalry of the Army of Northern Virginia and Chew's Battery. Baltimore, Maryland: Sun Job Printing Office, 1907.
- Wallace, Jr., Lee A. A Guide to Virginia Military Organizations, 1861–1865. Lynchburg, Virginia: H. E. Howard, 1986.
- Weaver, Jeffrey C. 45th Battalion, Virginia Infantry, Smith and Count's Battalions of Partisan Rangers. Lynchburg, Virginia: H.E. Howard, 1994.
- Weaver, Jeffrey C. Thurmond's Partisan Rangers and Swann's Battalion of Virginia Cavalry. Lynchburg, Virginia: H.E. Howard, 1993.
- Weaver, Jeffrey C. and Lee A. Wallace. Richmond Ambulance Co., Herbig's Infirmary Co., and the Virginia Public Guard and Armory Band. Lynchburg, Virginia: H.E. Howard, 1985.
- West, Michael. 30th Battalion Virginia Sharpshooters. Lynchburg, Virginia: H. E. Howard, Inc., 1995.
- Williamson, James J. Mosby's Rangers: A Record of the Operations of the Forty-Third Battalion Virginia Cavalry from its Organization to the Surrender. New York: Ralph B. Henyon, 1896.

==== Artillery ====
- Andrus, Michael J. The Brooke, Fauquier, Loudoun, and Alexandria Artillery. Lynchburg, Virginia: H.E. Howard, 1990.
- Bohannon, Keith S. The Giles, Allegheny and Jackson Artillery. Lynchburg, Virginia: H. E. Howard, 1990.
- Chamberlayne, Edwin H. War History and Roll of the Richmond Fayette Artillery, 38th Virginia Battalion Artillery, Confederate States Army. Richmond, Virginia: Everett Waddey, 1883.
- Driver, Jr., Robert J. The Staunton Artillery – McClanahan's Battery. Lynchburg, Virginia: H. E. Howard, Inc., 1988.
- Driver, Jr., Robert J. The First and Second Rockbridge Artillery. Lynchburg, Virginia: H. E. Howard, Inc., 1987.
- Driver, Jr., Robert J. The Staunton Artillery-McClanahan's Battery. Lynchburg, Virginia: H.E. Howard, 1988.
- Figg, Royall. When Men Only Dare to Go! Or The Story of a Boy Company. Richmond, Virginia: Whitter & Shepperson, 1885. (Jordan Virginia Artillery)
- Fonerdan, C. A. A Brief History of the Military Career of Carpenter's Battery. New Market, Virginia: Henkel & Company, 1911.
- Graves, Joseph A. The History of the Bedford Light Artillery. Bedford City, Virginia: Buford Democrat Press, 1903.
- Jones, Benjamin W. Under the Stars and Bars: A History of the Surry Light Artillery; Recollections of a Private Soldier in the War between the States. Richmond, Virginia: Everett Waddey Company, 1909.
- Krick, Robert K. The Fredericksburg Artillery. Lynchburg, Virginia: H. E. Howard, Inc., 1986.
- Krick, Robert K. Parker's Virginia Battery, C.S.A., original edition, Berryville, Virginia: Virginia Book Company, 1975. 2nd edition: Wilmington, North Carolina: Broadfoot Publishing, 1989.
- Maculusco, Gregory J. Morris, Orange, and King William Artillery. Lynchburg, Virginia: H.E. Howard, 1991.
- Moore, Robert H. Chew's, Ashby's, Shoemaker's Lynchburg and the Newtown Artillery. Lynchburg, Virginia: H. E. Howard Co., 1995.
- Moore, Robert H. The Charlottesville, Lee Lynchburg, and Johnson's Bedford Artillery. Lynchburg, Virginia: H.E. Howard, 1990
- Moore, Robert H. Graham's Petersburg, Jackson's Kanawha, and Lurty's Roanoke Horse Artillery. Lynchburg, Virginia: H. E. Howard Co., 1996.
- Moore, Robert H. The Richmond Fayette, Hampden, Thomas, and Blount's Lynchburg Artillery. Lynchburg, Virginia: H.E. Howard, 1991.
- Moore, Robert H. The 1st and 2nd Stuart Horse Artillery. Lynchburg, Virginia: H. E. Howard Co., 1985.
- Musselman, Homer D. The Caroline Light, Parker and Stafford Light, Virginia Artillery. Lynchburg, Virginia: H.E. Howard, 1992.
- Sherwood, William Cullen. The Nelson Artillery – Lamkin and Rives Batteries. Lynchburg, Virginia: H.E. Howard, 1991.
- Sherwood, William Cullen and Richard Ludlum Nicholas. Amherst Artillery, Albemarle Artillery, and Sturdivant's Battery. Lynchburg, Virginia: H.E. Howard, 1996.
- Shoemaker, J. J. Shoemaker's Battery, Stuart Horse Artillery, Pelham's Battalion. Memphis, Tennessee: S. C. Toof, 1908.
- Wallace, Jr., Lee A. Surry Light Artillery, and Martin's, Wright's, Coffin's Batteries of Virginia Artillery. Lynchburg, Virginia: H.E. Howard, 1995.
- Walters, John. Norfolk Blues: The Civil War Diary of the Norfolk Light Artillery Blues. Shippensburg, Pennsylvania: Burd Street Press, 1997.
- Wallace, Jr., Lee A. The Richmond Howitzers. Lynchburg, Virginia: H.E. Howard, 1993.
- Weaver, Jeffrey C. 10th and 19th Battalions of Heavy Artillery, Lynchburg, Virginia: H.E. Howard, 1996.
- Weaver, Jeffrey C. Branch, Harrington and Staunton Hill Artillery. Lynchburg, Virginia: H. E. Howard, 1997.
- Weaver, Jeffrey C. Brunswick Rebel, Johnston, Southside, United, James City, Lunenburg Rebel, Pamunkey Heavy Artillery, and Young's Harborguard. Lynchburg, Virginia: H.E. Howard, 1996.
- Weaver, Jeffrey C. Goochland Light, Goochland Turner and Mountain Artillery. Lynchburg, Virginia: H.E. Howard, 1994.
- Weaver, Jeffrey C. The Nottoway Artillery and Barr's Battery, Virginia Light Artillery. Lynchburg, Virginia: H.E. Howard, 1994.
- West, Patrick Michael. The Gauley, Mercer and Western Artillery. Lynchburg, Virginia: H.E. Howard, 1992.

==== Cavalry ====
- Alexander, John H. Mosby's Men. New York and Washington: Neale Publishing Company, 1907.
- Armstrong, Richard L. 7th Virginia Cavalry. Lynchburg, Virginia: H. E. Howard, Inc., 1992.
- Armstrong, Richard L. 11th Virginia Cavalry. Lynchburg, Virginia: H. E. Howard, Inc., 1989.
- Balfour, Daniel T. 13th Virginia Cavalry. Lynchburg, Virginia: H. E. Howard, Inc., 1986.
- Beale, R. L. T. History of the Ninth Virginia Cavalry. Richmond, Virginia: B.F. Johnson Publishing Co., 1899.
- Cole, Scott C. 34th Battalion Virginia Cavalry. Lynchburg, Virginia: H. E. Howard, Inc., 1993.
- Dawson, John Harper. Wildcat Cavalry: A Synoptic History of the Seventeenth Virginia Cavalry Regiment of the Jenkins–McCausland Brigade in the War Between the States. Dayton, Ohio: Morningside House, Inc., 1982.
- Delauter, Jr., Roger V. 18th Virginia Cavalry. Lynchburg, Virginia: H. E. Howard, Inc., 1985.
- Dickinson, Jack L. 16th Virginia Cavalry. Lynchburg, Virginia: H. E. Howard, Inc., 1989.
- Divine, John E. 35th Battalion Virginia Cavalry. Lynchburg, Virginia: H. E. Howard Co., 1985.
- Driver, Jr., Robert J. 1st Virginia Cavalry. Lynchburg, Virginia: H. E. Howard, Inc., 1991.
- Driver, Jr., Robert J. 10th Virginia Cavalry. Lynchburg, Virginia: H. E. Howard, Inc., 1992.
- Driver, Jr., Robert J. 14th Virginia Cavalry. Lynchburg, Virginia: H. E. Howard, Inc., 1988.
- Driver, Jr., Robert J. and Horold E. Howard. 2nd Virginia Cavalry. Lynchburg, Virginia: H.E. Howard, 1995.
- Fortier, John. 15th Virginia Cavalry. Lynchburg, Virginia: H.E. Howard, 1993.
- Frye, Dennis E. 12th Virginia Cavalry. Lynchburg, Virginia: H. E. Howard Co., 1988.
- Hackley, Woodford B. The Little Fork Rangers: A Sketch of Company "D" Fourth Virginia Cavalry. Richmond, Virginia: Dietz Printing Co., 1927.
- Harris, Nelson. 17th Virginia Cavalry. Lynchburg, Virginia: H. E. Howard, Inc., 1994.
- Holland, Darryl. Twenty-fourth Virginia Cavalry. Lynchburg, Virginia: H.E. Howard, 1997.
- Keen, Hugh C. and Horace Mewbern. 43rd Battalion Virginia Cavalry Mosby's Command. Lynchburg, Virginia: H. E. Howard, Inc., 1993.
- Kesterson, Brian Stuart. Campaigning With the 17th Virginia Cavalry Night Hawks at Monocacy. Washington, West Virginia: Nighthawk Press, 2005.
- Kleese, Richard B. 23rd Virginia Cavalry. Lynchburg, Virginia: H.E. Howard, 1996.
- Krick, Robert K. 13th Virginia Cavalry. Lynchburg, Virginia: H. E. Howard Co., 1982.
- Lambert, Dobbie Edward. Grumble: The W.E. Jones Brigade 1863–64. Wahiawa, Hawaii: Lambert Enterprises, Inc., 1992.
- McDonald, William M. A History of the Laurel Brigade, Originally Ashby's Cavalry. Baltimore, Maryland: Sun Job Printing Office, 1907.
- Musick, Michael P. 6th Virginia Cavalry. Lynchburg, Virginia: H. E. Howard Co., 1990.
- Myers, Frank M. The Comanches: A History of White's Battalion, Virginia Cavalry, Laurel Brig., Hampton Div., A.N.V., C.S.A. Baltimore, Maryland: Kelly, Pieta & Co., 1871.
- Nanzig, Thomas P. 3rd Virginia Cavalry. Lynchburg, Virginia: H. E. Howard Co., 1989.
- Scott, J. L. 36th and 37th Battalions Virginia Cavalry. H. E. HowardCo., 1986.
- Stiles, Kenneth L. 4th Virginia Cavalry. Lynchburg, Virginia: H.E. Howard Inc., 1985.
- Williams, George T. Company A, 37th Battalion Virginia Cavalry, C.S.A. Roanoke, Virginia: R. H. Fishburne, 1910.
- Williamson, James J. Mosby's Rangers: A Record of the Operations of the Forty-Third Battalion Virginia Cavalry. New York: Ralph B. Kenyom, 1896.

==== Infantry ====
- Armstrong, J. Cutler. 25th Virginia Infantry and 9th Battalion Virginia Infantry. Lynchburg, Virginia: H. E. Howard, Inc., 1990.
- Ashcraft, John M. 31st Virginia Infantry. Lynchburg, Virginia: H. E. Howard, Inc., 1988.
- Chapla, John D. 48th Virginia Infantry. Lynchburg, Virginia: H. E. Howard, Inc., 1989.
- Conrad, Daniel Burr. History of the First Fight and Organization of the Stonewall Brigade. The United Service, 1892.
- Crews, Edward R. and Timothy A. Parrish. 14th Virginia Infantry. Lynchburg, Virginia: H.E. Howard, 1995.
- Davis, James A. 51st Virginia Infantry. Lynchburg, Virginia: H. E. Howard, Inc., 1984.
- Delauter, Jr., Roger V. 62nd Virginia Infantry. Lynchburg, Virginia: H. E. Howard, Inc., 1988
- Driver, Jr., Robert J. 52nd Virginia Infantry. Lynchburg, Virginia: H. E. Howard, Inc., 1986.
- Frye, Dennis E. 2nd Virginia Infantry. Lynchburg, Virginia: H.E. Howard, 1984.
- Glasgow, William M. Northern Virginia's Own: The 17th Virginia Infantry Regiment, Confederate States Army. Gobill Press, 1989.
- Gregory, G. Howard. 38th Virginia Infantry. Lynchburg, Virginia: H.E. Howard Inc., 1988.
- Gunn, Ralph White. 24th Virginia Infantry. Lynchburg, Virginia: H.E. Howard Inc., 1987.
- Hale, Laura V. and Stanley S. Philips. History of the Forty-Ninth Virginia Infantry, C.S.A. Virginia: published by the authors, 1981.
- Hook, Patrick and Steve Smith. The Stonewall Brigade in the Civil War. Zenith Press, 2009.
- Krick, Robert E. L. 40th Virginia Infantry. Lynchburg, Virginia: H. E. Howard Co., 1985.
- Krick, Robert K. 30th Virginia Infantry. Lynchburg, Virginia: H.E. Howard, 1991.
- Loehr, Charles T. War History of the Old First Virginia Infantry Regiment. Richmond, Virginia: William Ellis Jones, 1884.
- Lowry, Terry. 22nd Virginia Infantry. Lynchburg, Virginia: H. E. Howard, Inc., 1988.
- Lowry, Terry. 26th Battalion Virginia Infantry. Lynchburg, Virginia: H.E. Howard, 1991.
- Manarin, Louis H. 15th Virginia Infantry. Lynchburg, Virginia: H.E. Howard, 1990 .
- O'Sullivan, Richard. 55th Virginia Infantry. Lynchburg, Virginia: H. E. Howard Co., 1989.
- Musselman, Homer D. 47th Virginia Infantry. Lynchburg, Virginia: H. E. Howard Co., 1991.
- Rankin, Thomas M. 22nd battalion Virginia Infantry. Lynchburg, Virginia: H.E. Howard, 1999.
- Rankin, Thomas M. 23rd Virginia Infantry. Lynchburg, Virginia: H. E. Howard, Inc., 1985.
- Reidenbaugh, Lowell. 27th Virginia Infantry. Lynchburg, Virginia: H. E. Howard, Inc., 1993.
- Reidenbaugh, Lowell. 33rd Virginia Infantry. Lynchburg, Virginia: H.E. Howard, 1987.
- Riggins, Susan A. 21st Virginia Infantry. Lynchburg, Virginia: H. E. Howard, Inc., 1991.
- Riggs, David F. 13th Virginia Infantry. Lynchburg, Virginia: H.E. Howard, 1988.
- Robertson, James I. 18th Virginia Infantry. Lynchburg, Virginia: H. E. Howard, Inc., 1984.
- Rose, Victor M. Ross' Texas Brigade. Louisville, Kentucky: 1881.
- Ruffner, Kevin C. From Aquia to Appomattox: The History of the 30th Virginia Infantry Regiment, 1861–1865. Ruffner.
- Ruffner, Kevin C. 44th Virginia Infantry. Lynchburg, Virginia: H. E. Howard, Inc., 1987.
- Scott, J. L. 36th Virginia Infantry. Lynchburg, Virginia: H. E. Howard, Inc., 1987.
- Scott, J. L. 45th Virginia Infantry. Lynchburg, Virginia: H. E. Howard, Inc., 1989.
- Sherwood, George L. and Jeffrey C. Weaver. 20th and 39th Virginia Infantry. Lynchburg, Virginia: H.E. Howard, 1994.
- Sherwood, George L. and Jeffrey C. Weaver. 59th Virginia Infantry. Lynchburg, Virginia: H.E. Howard, 1994.
- Sublett, Charles W. 57th Virginia Infantry. Lynchburg, Virginia: H.E. Howard, 1985.
- Swank, Walbrook D., editor/compiler. Stonewall Jackson's Foot Cavalry: Company A. Thirteenth Virginia Infantry. Shippensburg, Pennsylvania: Burd Street Press, 2007.
- Wallace, Jr., Lee A. 1st Virginia Infantry. Lynchburg, Virginia: H. E. Howard, 1984.
- Wallace, Jr., Lee A. 5th Virginia Infantry. Lynchburg, Virginia: H. E. Howard, 1988.
- Weaver, Jeffrey C. and George L. Sherwood. 54th Virginia Infantry. Lynchburg, Virginia: H.E. Howard, 1993.
- Wiatt, Alexander Lloyd. 26th Virginia Infantry. Lynchburg, Virginia: H.E. Howard, 1984.
- Wise, George. History of the 17th Virginia Infantry, C.S.A. Baltimore, Maryland: Kelly, Piet & Co., 1870.
- Wooddell, David W. Hoffman's Army: The 31st Virginia Infantry, CSA. CreativeSpaces, 2015. ISBN 978-1515396994.
- Young, William A. and Patricia C. Young. 56th Virginia Infantry. Lynchburg, Virginia: H.E. Howard, 1990.
- Young, William A. and Patricia C. Young. History of the 56th Virginia Regiment. James K. Baughman, 2008.
