= Scipio Handley =

- Citizenship: British
- Occupations: Fisherman, fishmonger
- Years active: fl. 1775–1784
- Known for: Serving as a Black Loyalist for the British during the American Revolution

Scipio Handley (fl. 1775–1784) was a free African-American who lived in British North America during the late 1700s. Initially a fisherman and fishmonger in the Province of South Carolina, Handley is best known as a Black Loyalist who assisted the British cause during the American Revolution. In 1775, he was caught by Patriots and sentenced to death for serving as a courier for Lord William Campbell, the royal governor of the province. However, Handley escaped from his imprisonment and accompanied the royal governor to Barbados, where he joined the Royal Navy. With the military, he served on the British side during the Siege of Savannah, during which time he was severely wounded. Following the war, he was brought to England and appeared before a government commission in London for the compensation of losses suffered during the revolution. He was awarded £20, becoming the only Black Loyalist to receive financial compensation for property losses. After 1784, he disappears from the historical record.

== Biography ==
=== Early history ===
Scipio Handley was a free Negro who lived in Charles Town in the Province of South Carolina during the American Revolution. (Note: The city of Charleston, South Carolina, was known as "Charles Town" during the American Revolution. It was officially renamed to "Charleston" in 1783.) Sources vary regarding his early history, including whether or not he had ever been enslaved. (Note: In a 2023 book, historian Philip Thomas Tucker stated that Handley had previously been enslaved, but escaped. This is seemingly corroborated in a 2012 book by Alan Gilbert, where he said that Handley "had left his Patriot master" in 1775. However, J. William Harris, in a 2009 book, stated that Handley had been born to a free woman who was a successful baker in Charles Town.) His status as a black freeman was rare in Charles Town, as over 90 percent of the black people in the city at the time were enslaved. Handley worked as a fisherman and fishmonger, largely working alongside enslaved people. Handley was successful in this career, as he was a ship's captain and earned enough money to afford to buy furniture and clothes in the town's market.

=== Activities during the revolution ===
In 1775, during the early period of the American Revolutionary War, the royal government of South Carolina began to lose power as anti-British sentiment grew. That year, Thomas Jeremiah, a free Negro who worked as a harbor pilot in Charles Town, was killed by hanging and burning for allegedly trying to incite black people to aid the British. According to historian Robert Olwell, Jeremiah was most likely a scapegoat whose death was used by the Patriots in South Carolina as a warning to other black people regarding their political affiliations and activities. As a fellow free Negro who worked on the docks of Charles Town, it is very likely that Handley personally knew Jeremiah.

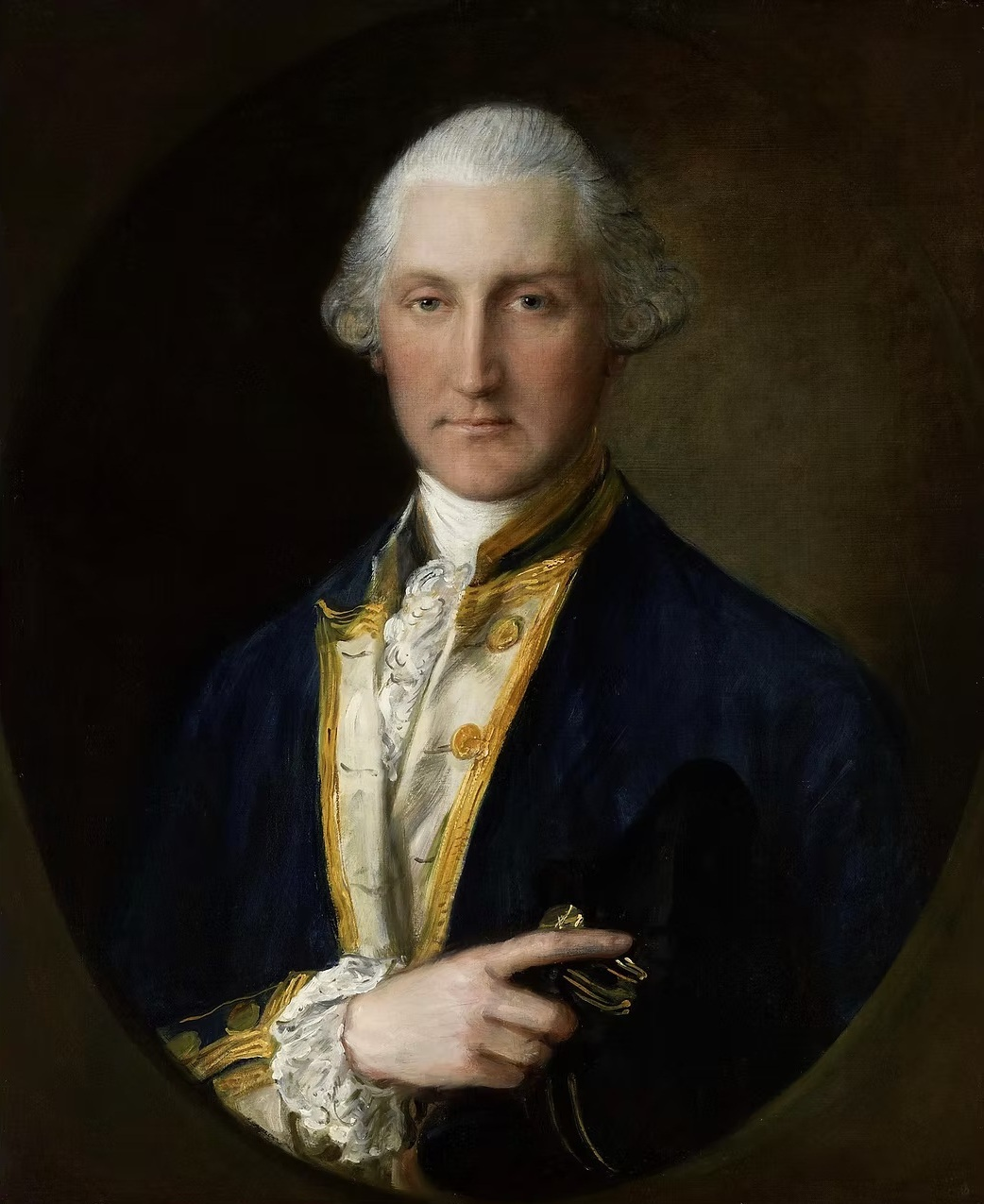
Lord William Campbell, whom Handley served as a courier in 1775

Around this same time, Lord William Campbell, the royal governor of South Carolina, was staying aboard a British warship stationed off the coast of Charles Town as a refugee from the increasing political volatility in the province. Following Jeremiah's death, Handley acted as a courier for Campbell, delivering messages to and from the royal governor and his supporters on the mainland. Several weeks later, during one of his boat rides, Handley was discovered by a group of Patriot militiamen who opened fire on his boat, wounding one of his crewmates. Handley was ultimately captured and imprisoned. While imprisoned, he was sentenced to death by the Patriots for acting against the Continental Congress. Upon learning of his planned execution, Handley acquired a file and was able to file away his chains before jumping from his holding cell on the second floor of the local jail. In total, he had been held in jail for six weeks. After escaping, he fled to the governor's ship seeking refuge. In January 1776, when the governor's ship departed from South Carolina, Handley, alongside several other black people from the province, accompanied him. The ship first went to St. Augustine in East Florida. The ship eventually made its way to the British colony of Barbados.

=== Military service ===
While in Barbados, Handley volunteered to fight for the British in the Revolutionary War, ultimately joining the Royal Navy. Upon hearing that the British had reclaimed the Province of Georgia, Handley boarded the first British ship from Barbados going to the colony, arriving in late 1778.

Handley lived in Savannah, Georgia, where he worked at a British armory for several weeks, producing grapeshot for the war effort. In 1779, when French and Patriot forces conducted the Siege of Savannah, Handley participated in the city's defense. During the battle, Handley transported grapeshot to a cannon located on a redoubt. During the battle, he suffered a bullet wound from a musket shot in his leg. The wound became gangrenous, and his leg was almost amputated as a result. Although it was not amputated, the wound never fully healed, and years later, Handley reported that he still suffered intense and debilitating pain.

=== Following the war ===
At the conclusion of the war, as part of the terms ending the conflict, Handley was taken back to England with the departing British forces. He was one of a number of injured soldiers evacuated to England, and while there he received a military discharge. In London, Handley appeared before the Loyalist Claims Commission, seeking government compensation for losses suffered as a result of the successful revolution. Ultimately, he received £20 in compensation for property losses. In doing so, he became the only Black Loyalist to receive compensation for property losses. This occurred in January 1784, and the report collected by the commission provides a narrative of Handley's life. After the commission, Handley disappears from the historical record.

== See also ==
- African Americans in the Revolutionary War
- Colonial period of South Carolina
- History of Charleston, South Carolina

== Sources ==
- Brooking, Greg (Winter 2014). ""Of Material Importance": Governor James Wright and the Siege of Savannah". The Georgia Historical Quarterly. 98 (4). Georgia Historical Society: 251–299. ISSN 0016-8297. OCLC 565102618.
- Brown, Wallace (August 1964). "Negroes and the American Revolution". History Today. 14 (8): 556–563. ISSN 0018-2753. OCLC 1644842.
- Brown, Wallace (1969). The Good Americans: The Loyalists in the American Revolution. New York City: William Morrow and Company. OCLC 4155.
- Brown, Wallace (1982). "Negroes and the American Revolution". In Glasrud, Bruce A.; Smith, Alan M. (eds.). Race Relations in British North America, 1607–1783. Chicago: Nelson-Hall. pp. 327–338. ISBN 978-0-88229-388-2. OCLC 7976701.
- Butler, Nic (August 9, 2019). "The Evolution of Charleston's Name". Charleston County Public Library. Archived from the original on October 13, 2024.
- Callahan, North (1963). Royal Raiders: The Tories of the American Revolution. Indianapolis: Bobbs-Merrill Company. OCLC 710956.
- Chopra, Ruma (2013). Choosing Sides: Loyalists in Revolutionary America. American Controversies. Lanham, Maryland: Rowman & Littlefield. ISBN 978-1-4422-0571-0. OCLC 1273660328.
- Dawson, Kevin (Fall 2013). "Enslaved Ship Pilots in the Age of Revolutions: Challenging Notions of Race and Slavery between the Boundaries of Land and Sea". Journal of Social History. 47 (1). Oxford University Press: 71–100. ISSN 0022-4529. JSTOR 43306046. OCLC 42392476.
- Fraser, Walter J. Jr. (1991) [1989]. Charleston! Charleston! The History of a Southern City (First paperback ed.). Columbia, South Carolina: University of South Carolina Press. ISBN 978-0-87249-643-9. OCLC 20168842.
- Gilbert, Alan (2012). Black Patriots and Loyalists: Fighting for Emancipation in the War for Independence. Chicago: University of Chicago Press. ISBN 978-0-226-29307-3. OCLC 748577980.
- Harris, J. William (2009). The Hanging of Thomas Jeremiah: A Free Black Man's Encounter with Liberty. New Haven, Connecticut: Yale University Press. ISBN 978-0-300-15214-2. OCLC 593254015.
- Herrmann, Rachel B. (2019). No Useless Mouth: Waging War and Fighting Hunger in the American Revolution. Ithaca, New York: Cornell University Press. ISBN 9781501716133. OCLC 1155496961.
- Hoock, Holger (2017). Scars of Independence: America's Violent Birth. New York City: Crown Publishing Group. ISBN 978-0-8041-3728-7. OCLC 953617831.
- Jasanoff, Maya (2012) [2011]. Liberty's Exiles: American Loyalists in the Revolutionary World (First Vintage Books ed.). New York City: Vintage Books. ISBN 978-1-4000-7547-8. OCLC 727702871.
- Norton, Mary Beth (October 1973). "The Fate of Some Black Loyalists of the American Revolution". The Journal of Negro History. 58 (4). University of Chicago Press on behalf of the Association for the Study of African American Life and History: 402–426. doi:10.2307/2716747. ISSN 1548-1867. JSTOR 2716747. LCCN 2006-236700. OCLC 60628423.
- Olwell, Robert (1998). Masters, Slaves & Subjects: The Culture of Power in the South Carolina Low Country, 1740–1790. Ithaca, New York: Cornell University Press. ISBN 978-0-8014-3488-4. OCLC 38174225.
- Olwell, Robert (Summer 2021). "Scipio Handley's Great Escape". Gilder Lehrman Institute of American History. Black Lives in the Founding Era. Archived from the original on April 29, 2025.
- Palmer, Aaron J. (2014). A Rule of Law: Elite Political Authority and the Coming of the Revolution in the South Carolina Lowcountry, 1763–1776. Leiden: Brill Publishers. doi:10.1163/9789004272354. ISBN 978-90-04-27235-4. OCLC 878108931.
- Piecuch, Jim (2008). Three Peoples, One King: Loyalists, Indians, and Slaves in the Revolutionary South, 1775–1782. Columbia, South Carolina: University of South Carolina Press. ISBN 978-1-57003-737-5. OCLC 831486526.
- Pressly, Paul M. (2024). A Southern Underground Railroad: Black Georgians and the Promise of Spanish Florida and Indian Country. Athens, Georgia: University of Georgia Press. ISBN 978-0-8203-6687-6. OCLC 1443635604.
- Pybus, Cassandra (2006). Epic Journeys of Freedom: Runaway Slaves of the American Revolution and Their Global Quest for Liberty. Boston: Beacon Press. ISBN 978-0-8070-5515-1. OCLC 60419467.
- Quarles, Benjamin (1961). The Negro in the American Revolution. Institute of Early American History and Culture. Chapel Hill, North Carolina: University of North Carolina Press. ISBN 978-0-8078-0833-7. OCLC 272669.
- Ryan, William R. (2005) [2004]. ""Under the Color of Law": The Ordeal of Thomas Jeremiah, a Free Black Man, and the Struggle for Power in Revolutionary South Carolina". In Harvey, Tamara; O'Brien, Greg (eds.). George Washington's South (First paperback ed.). Gainesville, Florida: University Press of Florida. pp. 223–256. ISBN 978-0-8130-2917-7. OCLC 52347482.
- Schama, Simon (2006) [2005]. Rough Crossings: Britain, the Slaves, and the American Revolution (First U.S. ed.). New York City: Ecco Press. ISBN 978-0-06-053916-0. OCLC 61652611.
- Snyder, Jennifer K. (2012). "Revolutionary Repercussions: Loyalist Slaves in St. Augustine and Beyond". In Bannister, Jerry; Riordan, Liam (eds.). The Loyal Atlantic: Remaking the British Atlantic in the Revolutionary Era. Toronto: University of Toronto Press. pp. 165–184. doi:10.3138/9781442690271. ISBN 978-1-4426-4208-9. OCLC 868069028.
- Tucker, Phillip Thomas (2023). Brothers in Liberty: The Forgotten Story of the Free Black Haitians Who Fought for American Independence. Lanham, Maryland: Stackpole Books. ISBN 978-0-8117-7062-0. OCLC 1359607747.
