= Thomas Jeremiah =

South Carolinian free Negro (died 1775)

Thomas Jeremiah (died 18 August 1775) was a free Negro harbor pilot, firefighter, fisherman and merchant from Charles Town, (Note: "Charles Town" or "Charlestown" was the name of the unincorporated capital of South Carolina until its incorporation as Charleston in 1783.) South Carolina, in British North America. A prominent resident of the city, he was executed for attempting to foment a slave revolt on the eve of the American Revolutionary War. His execution was controversial even at the time, and he has since become a "representative" for the state of blacks in the Revolution.

== Biography ==
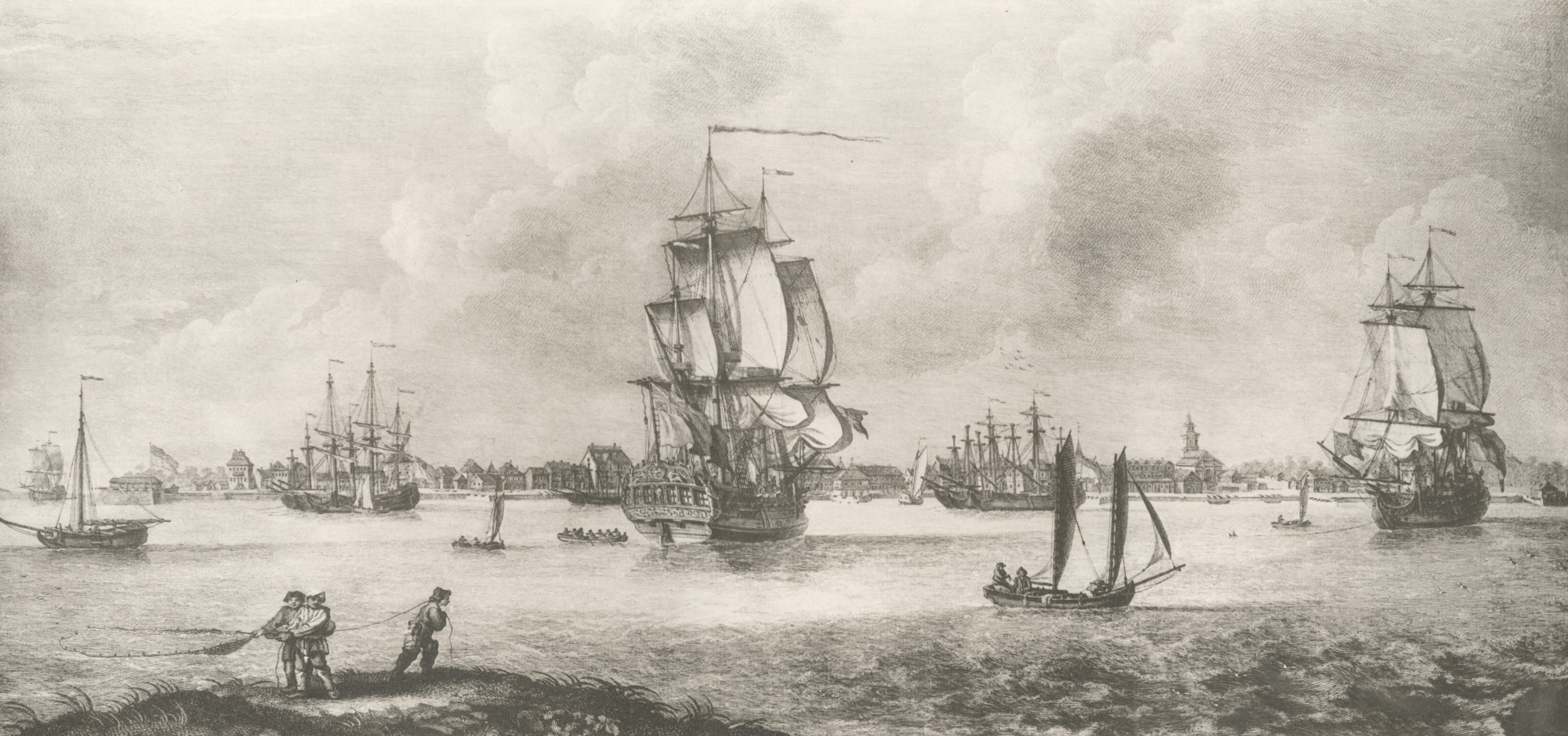
1778 illustration of Charles Town Harbour

Known often as Thomas Jerry or simply as Jerry in contemporary sources, little is known of his life details. This includes when or where he was born and whether he was free from birth. At the time, 99 percent of blacks in South Carolina were slaves, and typically free blacks such as Jeremiah would have purchased themselves from their masters.

Jeremiah's first appearances in the historical record are in 1750s in the South-Carolina Gazette where he was blamed for running both HMS Jamaica and the Brothers Adventure aground. His skills improved as he was recognized as "one of the best pilots in the harbor" in 1775 and he was also recognized for other activities ("[his] Publick services were universally acknowledged" according to the governor). Jeremiah was also a slave owner, who used slaves in a commercial fishing operation. In 1768, the South-Carolina Gazette noted that "The Negro Jerry (well known for his extinguishing of fires) has just completed a Well-Boat, in order to supply the inhabitants of [Charles Town] with Live Fish every day".

His wealth was estimated as high as £1,000 sterling (equivalent to $300,000 in 2025). Scholar J. William Harris speculates that Jeremiah was probably the richest Black person in the Thirteen Colonies at that time. By the 1770s, Jeremiah was well known in Charles Town and in 1771 respect for him may have been responsible for a successful request for a pardon from Lieutenant Governor William Bull for an assault charge.

== The death of Thomas Jeremiah ==
=== Background ===
Revolutionary fervor gripped South Carolina's capital by the beginning of 1775. From 1765, the British Parliament had implemented a series of taxes and punitive legislation on the colonies which met with more and more resistance from the North American colonies. Royal governance in the Province of South Carolina was increasingly sinking into dysfunction as the Commons House of Assembly was repeatedly dissolved by royal governors. Extralegal committees and assemblies were formed to enforce resistance to British actions. In response to the British shutting down Boston Harbor and passing the Intolerable Acts, the extralegal General Committee called a General Meeting for 6 July 1774. The General Meeting chose delegates to the First Continental Congress of most of Britain's colonies in North America. That Congress met in Philadelphia from 5 September to 26 October 1774, with two of South Carolina's delegates, Christopher Gadsden and Thomas Lynch, playing "especially conspicuous roles" with their belligerent attitudes toward the British. In South Carolina, the General Meeting selected a corporate-based Committee of 99 which became a de facto government for the colony. The de jure royal Commons House of Assembly supported and funded these activities.

In late 1774, the General Meeting called elections for a new Provincial Congress. That Congress, most of whose members were also representatives in the royal Commons House of Assembly, first met on 11 January 1775. The Congress and the committees it created moved to consolidate control of the province. In April, a Secret Committee seized armaments from gunpowder magazines and the State House, (Note: In 1786, the South Carolina General Assembly decided to move the capital from Charleston to Columbia. The 1753 State House in Charleston burned in 1788. The building was rebuilt in 1790 and is now the Charleston County Courthouse.) and in May in response to battles at Lexington and Concord, the Congress voted to print £1 million (equivalent to $12.5 million (Note: The conversion figure of $12.5 million is provided in the source, but no basis for it is given.)) in currency, raise an armed defense force and establish a Council of Safety with Henry Laurens as its president. The new Council held nearly unlimited power in the province.

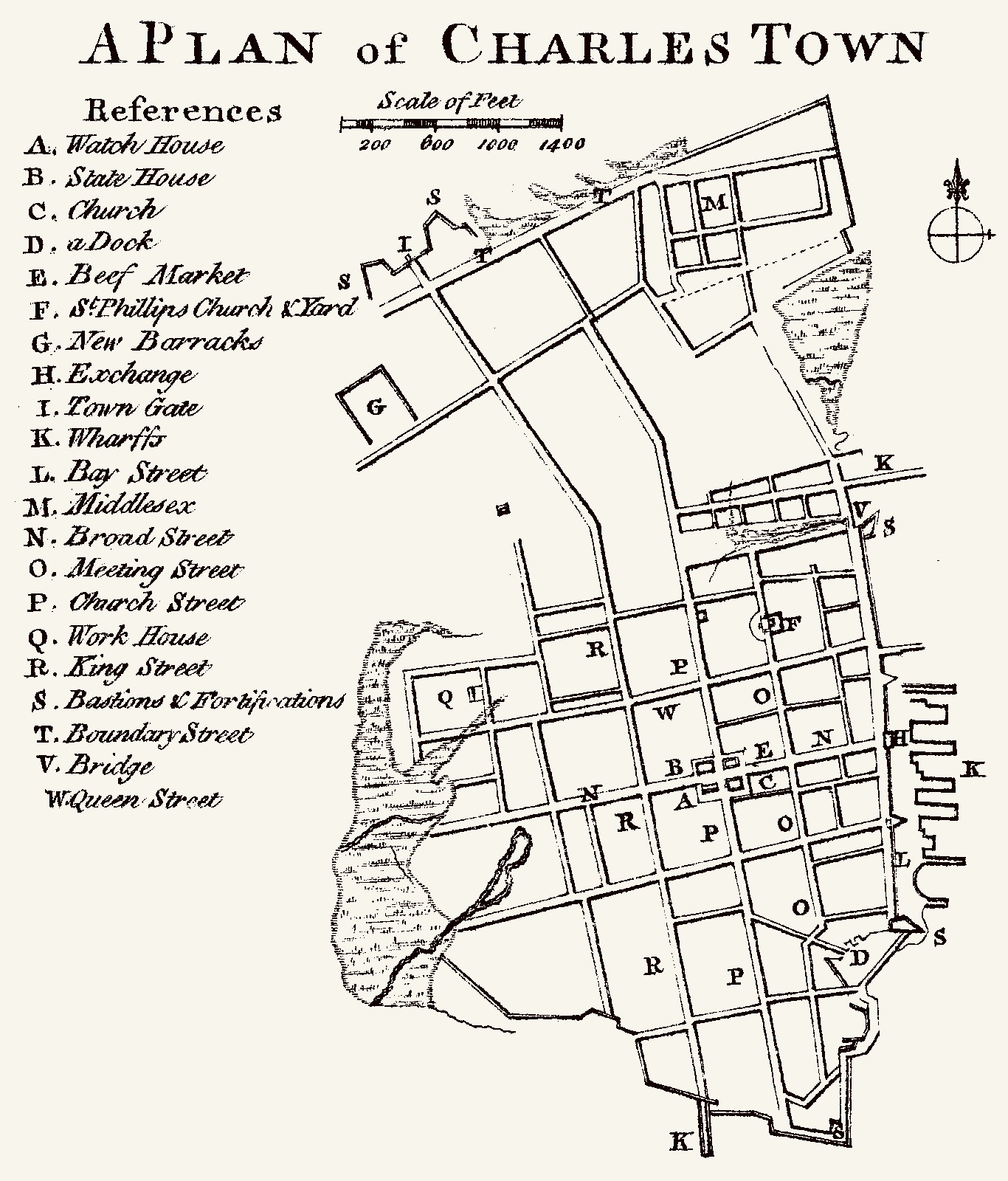
A 1773 Map of Charles Town

In May and June 1775, Charlestonians feared the twin threats of invasion by British and instigation of slave insurrections. The Secret Committee had seized official British mail in April 1775 which reportedly included plans to incite Cherokee attacks on colonists and slave rebellions. A committee of five appointed by the Provincial Congress and headed by Thomas Bee was tasked with investigating slave insurrection.

On 14 June 1775, the committee submitted a report that implicated among others "Jerry the pilot". Jeremiah's skills as a pilot were a perceived as a threat by the committee as he could pilot British ships over Charles Town Bar and into Charles Town Harbor. The somewhat contradictory testimony of two slaves, Jemmy and Sambo, was used to implicate Jeremiah. In a letter to his son John, Henry Laurens wrote that the committee was disinclined to apply any punishment beyond having "one or two Negroes ... severely flogged & banished". Henry Laurens stepped in and pressured the committee to either release the accused if innocent or to apply the death penalty if not.

A new royal governor, William Campbell, arrived in the capital on 18 June 1775. (His predecessor Montagu had returned to London in 1773 and William Bull had been acting governor in the interim.) However, even the vestiges of royal power were gone. In one of its last acts, the de jure Commons House approved of the Provincial Congress' issuance of currency and then "simply faded out of existence".

=== Trial and execution ===
Under South Carolina's Negro Act of 1740, neither slaves nor free Negroes could receive a jury trial. Passed in the wake of the Stono Rebellion, the act stipulated that incitement to insurrection was punishable by death. In such capital cases, the act called for a court of two justices of the peace and three to five property owners. On 11 August 1775, such a court was convened to try Jeremiah of the general charge of attempting to raise an insurrection as well as specific charges of plotting to pilot British ships over Charles Town Bar and planning to set fire to Charles Town.

Again the testimony of Jemmy and Sambo was used to implicate Jeremiah. In Laurens' account of the trial, Jeremiah originally denied being acquainted with Jemmy, but it was determined that Jemmy was Jeremiah's wife's brother (this being the only evidence that Jeremiah was married). J. William Harris posits that Jemmy's testimony could have stemmed for his own desire for a pardon.

The court unanimously found him guilty and sentenced him to death by hanging, with his body to be burned. Following the sentencing, the case became a proxy battle between opposing sides in South Carolina's conflict with the personages of Congress president Henry Laurens and royal Governor William Campbell. The recently arrived Campbell intervened on Jeremiah's behalf and carried on an exchange of letters with Laurens attempting to persuade the latter of the injustice of the pending execution.

Jeremiah maintained his innocence until the end. Nonetheless, on the morning of 18 August 1775, he was taken from the Workhouse (Note: The Workhouse or Work House, built to house runaway, unruly or misbehaving slaves, was in the vicinity of 15 Magazine Street.) on Magazine Street and hanged on the workhouse green. After he expired, his body was burned on a woodpile.

=== Aftermath ===
Following rumors of violence against him, Jeremiah's champion Governor Campbell dissolved the defunct Commons House and decamped to HMS Tamar, a warship in Charles Town harbor, never to return to the city. All vestiges of royal control had evaporated.

In November, the first shots in South Carolina's revolution were fired at a three-day skirmish between loyalist and patriot militias at Ninety-Six in the Upcountry. By the end of the year, the Provincial Congress was in control of the entirety of South Carolina. Yet, as 1776 dawned, there were still few of Charles Town's elite who contemplated independence. A legislatively enacted constitution referred to South Carolina as a colony. However, following an attempted British invasion near Charles Town in June, the cause of revolution was boosted.

=== Analysis ===
Due to the dearth of information and the distance of time, modern writers generally refrain from speculating as to whether Jeremiah was actually guilty of the crime for which he hanged. Historian Robert M. Weir notes that Loyalists saw Jeremiah as "the victim of a Machiavellian policy having a twofold purpose": to intimidate harbor pilots who might aid the British and to whip up anti-British sentiment to further military preparedness. He also credits another possibility: white anxiety was increasing with the pre-Revolutionary turmoil and whites sought solidarity by victimizing largely helpless blacks.

Historian Walter J. Fraser Jr., bluntly remarks that while Jeremiah might have been taking advantage of domestic turmoil to plot a slave revolt, he may have also been "the scapegoat of a scheme developed by the political elite who hoped to divert the attention of the laboring classes by playing on their deepest fears". On the other hand, Fraser also acknowledges that Jeremiah simply could have been the "victim of white paranoia, sacrificed as an example to other blacks".

J. William Harris argues that whether he was guilty or innocent, "Thomas Jeremiah did not need to gather arms or preach revolution to undermine slavery, because his whole life was a refutation of whites' basic [racial] justification for slavery".

== Legacy ==
Following his execution, Jeremiah never appeared again in the public record and the dispensation of his body, his wife, his slaves, and other property are a mystery.

For a few years following his execution, Jeremiah was invoked by both sides in the Revolution on occasion. Governor Campbell sent an account of the trial and surrounding events to London where it was cited by Lord Sandwich in parliament as an example of the "cruelty and baseness" of the colonials. The events were also cited in John Lind's "An Answer to the Declaration of the American Congress".

Henry Laurens would later claim "I abhor slavery" although he never freed his own slaves. His son John advocated freeing of slaves and the creation of a regiment of free blacks to fight for the colonials in the Revolution, a plan that was defeated in the South Carolina Assembly.

In early American histories of the Revolution, the events surrounding Jeremiah's execution were largely ignored, relegated to a literal footnote in John Drayton's Memoirs of the American Revolution. The last mention (albeit largely inaccurate) of the story was in 1851, whereupon Jeremiah was forgotten for over a century.

The existence of Thomas Jeremiah went largely unnoted for 200 years following his death. J. William Harris credits a 1978 essay by Peter H. Wood for unearthing the story of Jeremiah for the modern reader. Since then, numerous scholars have written of Jeremiah despite the paucity of details on his life. They have used Jeremiah's case to illustrate particular issues of his time. His name appears in the title of Harris's The Hanging of Thomas Jeremiah: A Free Black Man's Encounter with Liberty and William R. Ryan's The World of Thomas Jeremiah: Charles Town on the Eve of the American Revolution. In the South Carolina Encyclopedia, Ryan proffers that "Jeremiah's ordeal illustrated the three-way struggle for power between blacks, Whigs, and Tories that was taking place throughout the lower South on the eve of the Revolutionary War."

Jeremiah has become a "representative" for the state of blacks in the Revolution, and the story is used to show how "British forces became, in effect, a force for slave liberation" although, as Harris notes, both Jeremiah and his champion William Campbell were slaveowners themselves.

== See also ==
- Colonial period of South Carolina
- History of Charleston, South Carolina
- Scipio Handley, a contemporary of Jeremiah who was similarly sentenced to death for assisting the British
