= In Deadly Earnest =

1991 book by Phil Gottschalk

In Deadly Earnest: The History of the First Missouri Brigade, CSA
- Author: Phil Gottschalk
- Language: English
- Subject: The First Missouri Brigade
- Genre: Non-fiction
- Publisher: Missouri River Press
- Publication date: 1991
- Publication place: United States
- Pages: 562
- ISBN: 0-9631136-1-5

In Deadly Earnest: The History of the First Missouri Brigade, CSA is a 1991 book written by Phil Gottschalk and published by Missouri River Press. The book follows the story of the brigade from its formation as a unit of the Confederate States Army in the early stages of the American Civil War to the end of the war, and posits that the men of the unit were fighting for the Southern United States, not slavery. It is illustrated with maps and photographs. Reviewers characterized the book as redundant and criticized its tendency to digress off its topic. One reviewer questioned some of the book's conclusions and described it as "ancestor worship posing as history". Other reviewers, acknowledging the book's flaws, described it as a positive addition to the bibliography of the American Civil War.

== Content ==
In Deadly Earnest: The History of the First Missouri Brigade, CSA was written by journalist Phil Gottschalk and was published by Missouri River Press in 1991. The topic of the book is the First Missouri Brigade, a unit of the Confederate States Army during the American Civil War, although it also contains material about more general subject, including an overview of other Missouri Confederates units who were active during the early stages of the war. One of the books' premises is that the brigade was not fighting for the preservation of slavery, but for the South. In Deadly Earnest covers the story of the brigade throughout the entire war, as opposed to The South's Finest, a similar work that only extends its coverage through the Siege of Vicksburg. Gottschalk's book was written after 20 years of research. It is illustrated with maps and photographs.

== Reception ==
Gregory J. W. Urwin of the University of Central Arkansas reviewed the book and criticized several elements of it. In particular, Urwin criticized In Deadly Earnest for containing significant blocks of off-topic material, as well as incorrect statements such as a statement that the Mexican-American War ended in 1847 and the claim that Missouri provided more Confederate soldiers than some of the Confederate states. Additionally, Urwin stated that Gottschalk's claim that the First Missouri Brigade did not fight for slavery was poorly supported, and questioned his conclusion that the cause of Bleeding Kansas was "pious jayhawk horse thieves". While noting that Gottschalk did do thorough research, Urwin described the book overall as "ancestor worship posing as history".

William Garrett Piston, reviewing for the Journal of Military History, stated that In Deadly Earnest was frequently redundant and could have been substantially shorter. Comparing the book to The South's Finest, Piston assessed it as having better source documentation and maps, but inferior photographs. Piston opined that In Deadly Earnest was more focused on narrative than analysis, and criticized the work for its tendency to get off topic. Even with the noted flaws, Piston provided an overall review of the book as one that "deserve[d] the attention of serious scholars".

Michael B. Ballard, of Mississippi State University, reviewed the book for Civil War History in 1994. Ballard described In Deadly Earnest as "generally well written" and stated that it was well-researched. However, he also noted that the book was overly redundant in places and contained significant digressions into off-topic material. Also criticized was a confusing citation style that underlined the titles of cited works in footnotes and in appearances in the book text, but then italicized them in the bibliography. Ballard believed that the book's strength was its use and quotation of primary sources, particularly previously unused ones. Overall, he described In Deadly Earnest as a productive addition to American Civil War historiography, but one that did not reach "the accomplishments of [its] subject".

== Sources ==
- Ballard, Michael B. (1994). "The South's Finest: The First Missouri Confederate Brigade from Pea Ridge to Vicksburg and In Deadly Earnest: The History of the First Missouri Brigade, CSA". Civil War History. 40 (3): 257–259. doi:10.1353/cwh.1994.0060. ISSN 0009-8078.
- Piston, William Garrett (1994). "The South's Finest: The First Missouri Confederate Brigade from Pea Ridge to Vicksburg and In Deadly Earnest: The History of the First Missouri Brigade, CSA". Journal of Military History. 58 (1): 149–150. doi:10.2307/2944194. ISSN 0899-3718. JSTOR 2944194.
- Urwin, Gregory J. W. (1994). "In Deadly Earnest: The History of the First Missouri Brigade, CSA by Phil Gottschalk". Journal of Southern History. 60 (2): 411–412. doi:10.2307/2210131. JSTOR 2210131.
