= Florida Department of Military Affairs =

Oversees the Florida National Guard and State Guard

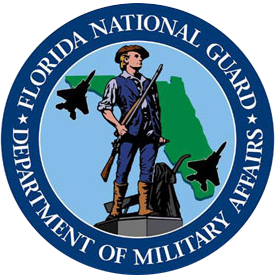

Agency overview
- Jurisdiction: Florida
- Headquarters: St. Augustine, Florida
- Employees: 12,000 National Guard members 2,000 full time military personnel 400 state employees
- Annual budget: $514,000,000+
- Agency executives: Major General John D. Haas, Adjutant General, Florida Department of Military Affairs; Brigadier General Michael A. Valle, Assistant Adjutant General, Air, Florida Department of Military Affairs; Major General Robert G. Carruthers, III, Assistant Adjutant General, Army, Florida Department of Military Affairs
- Child agencies: Florida Army National Guard; Florida Air National Guard

The Florida Department of Military Affairs is a state agency of the state of Florida, which was created by Chapter 250, Florida Statutes. The department is responsible for providing management oversight and administrative support to the Florida National Guard. The two branches of the Florida National Guard, the Florida Army National Guard and the Florida Air National Guard, fall under the command of the state Adjutant General, an appointee of the Governor of Florida, and fall under the command of the Governor of Florida.

== Florida Army National Guard ==
The Florida Army National Guard has a dual federal and state mission. When in federal service, it acts as a reserve component of the United States Army. When activated by the state of Florida, the Army National Guard is tasked with emergency relief support during natural disasters such as floods, earthquakes and forest fires; search and rescue operations; support to civil defense authorities; maintenance of vital public services, and counterdrug operations.

== Florida Air National Guard ==
The Florida Air National Guard has a dual federal and state mission. When in federal service, it acts as a reserve component of the United States Air Force. Like the Florida Army National Guard, when activated by the state of Florida, the Florida Air National Guard may be deployed to support emergency services operations. In addition, the Air National Guard has complete responsibility for the air defense of the United States with one of the Florida Air National Guard's flying units, the 125th Fighter Wing, performing this mission from both Jacksonville Air National Guard Base at Jacksonville International Airport and an alert operating location at Homestead Air Reserve Base.

== Florida State Guard ==
The Florida State Defense Force is the state defense force of Florida. The FSG was initially created in 1941 to serve as a stateside replacement for the Florida National Guard while the National Guard was deployed abroad with the Army during World War II. The FSG is available to the governor of Florida whenever needed but, unlike the National Guard, the FSG is trained and funded by the state and therefore cannot be federalized. The FSG was reactivated in 2022 after the Florida legislature appropriated US$10 million in funding.

== Inactive components ==
=== Florida Naval Militia ===
The Florida Naval Militia is the currently inactive naval militia of Florida. The Governor of Florida is permitted, under Florida law, to organize a naval militia and a marine corps in accordance with federal law governing the Naval Militia and the United States Navy Reserve and/or Marine Corps of the United States (to include the Marine Corps Reserve) and regulations issued by the Secretary of the Navy.
