= Alan Gilbert (American academic) =

Alan Gilbert is the John Evans Professor at the Josef Korbel School of International Studies at the University of Denver and operator of the web site Democratic Individuality. He was a member of the Harvard chapter of Students for a Democratic Society at the time of the occupation of University Hall at Harvard in 1969.

== Works ==
- Democratic Individuality. Cambridge University Press. 31 August 1990. pp. 3–. ISBN 978-0-521-38709-5.
- Must Global Politics Constrain Democracy?: Great-Power Realism, Democratic Peace, and Democratic Internationalism. Princeton University Press. 5 September 1999. ISBN 0-691-00182-0.
- Black Patriots and Loyalists: Fighting for Emancipation in the War for Independence. University of Chicago Press. 20 April 2012. ISBN 978-0-226-29307-3.
