= The South's Finest =

1993 book about the First Missouri Brigade

The South's Finest: The First Missouri Confederate Brigade from Pea Ridge to Vicksburg
- Cover
- Author: Philip Thomas Tucker
- Language: English
- Subject: The First Missouri Brigade
- Genre: Non-fiction
- Publisher: White Mane Publishing Company
- Publication date: 1993
- Publication place: United States
- Pages: 271
- ISBN: 978-0-9425-9731-8

The South's Finest: The First Missouri Brigade from Pea Ridge to Vicksburg is a 1993 book written by Philip Thomas Tucker and published by White Mane Publishing Company. The book follows the history of the First Missouri Brigade of the Confederate States Army from its formation to the end of the Siege of Vicksburg. Reviewers praised the book for its use of primary source quotations and its detailed analysis of the civilian background of the unit's members. However, it was also criticized for excessively praising the unit, for being melodramatic, and failing to provide a quantitative analysis of what made the First Missouri Brigade the "finest" brigade in the Confederacy.

== Content ==
The South's Finest: The First Missouri Brigade from Pea Ridge to Vicksburg was written by Philip Thomas Tucker and published by White Mane Publishing Company in 1993. It is a unit history focusing on the First Missouri Brigade, a brigade that served in the Confederate States Army during the American Civil War. Besides providing a combat history of the unit, the personal backgrounds of the men are also analyzed in the book. Particular emphases include Roman Catholicism and St. Louis University. While the book uses both primary and secondary sources, primary sources such as the diaries and memoirs of brigade veterans are used and quoted frequently. Its coverage ends with the end of the Siege of Vicksburg and is illustrated with photographs and maps.

== Reception ==
Stephen Rawlings, reviewing for the Journal of Southern History, praised Tucker's research into the background of the unit's soldiers, particularly why they remained loyal to the Confederacy despite facing logistical and leadership challenges, having different beliefs than many other Confederate soldiers, and fighting almost exclusively outside of their home state. However, Rawlings also viewed Tucker's definition of what made the First Missouri Brigade the "finest" unit in the Confederacy. In particular, he noted that Tucker relied too little of quantitative data, such as Thomas Livermore's work on American Civil War battle losses. Overall, Rawlings stated that the greatest contribution of The South's Finest was its analysis of what eliteness constitutes from a military perspective.

Reviewing the book for Civil War History, Michael B. Ballard stated that Tucker did a good job of analyzing the background conditions that led to the formation of the brigade, and that the book was well-researched. Comparing The South's Finest to In Deadly Earnest, another modern First Missouri Brigade unit history, Ballard noted that The South's Finest had "more familiarity with recent scholarship". However, Ballard criticized the book for its frequent use of superlatives, which he viewed as excessive. Ballard stated that Tucker presented an overly glossy view of the First Missouri Brigade, stating that it was impossible for the unit to be as perfect as Tucker portrayed it. In addition, The South's Finest's prose was described as "sometimes puzzling". Overall, Ballard described the book as a positive addition to Western Theater research, but opined that it did not meet "the accomplishments of [its] subject".

William Garrett Piston, reviewing for The Journal of Military History, described The South's Finest as "chronically and annoyingly" melodramatic. Again comparing the work to In Deadly Earnest, he noted that Tucker's work had a higher quality of photographs, but a lesser quality of maps. The South's Finest was noted to have a strong analysis of the civilian background of the brigade members and a quality use of quotations of period accounts. However, Piston noted that it was difficult to determine what material in the book came from which sources, as Tucker used footnotes too infrequently. Additionally, Piston criticized Tucker for drawing conclusions inconsistently. In particular, he noted that The South's Finest is inconsistent with its conclusions about the value of West Point tactical training, and states that while Tucker opined that the frontier background of some of the brigade's soldiers provided an advantage, this is inconsistent with the similar performance of the brigade's urban soldiers. While noting these weaknesses, Piston concluded that The South's Finest "deserve[d] the attention of serious scholars".

== Sources ==
- Ballard, Michael B. (1994). "The South's Finest: The First Missouri Confederate Brigade from Pea Ridge to Vicksburg and In Deadly Earnest: The History of the First Missouri Brigade, CSA". Civil War History. 40 (3): 257–259. doi:10.1353/cwh.1994.0060. ISSN 0009-8078.
- Piston, William Garrett (1994). "The South's Finest: The First Missouri Confederate Brigade from Pea Ridge to Vicksburg and In Deadly Earnest: The History of the First Missouri Brigade, CSA". Journal of Military History. 58 (1): 149–150. doi:10.2307/2944194. ISSN 0899-3718. JSTOR 2944194.
- Rawlings, Stephen (1995). "The South's Finest: The First Missouri Confederate Brigade from Pea Ridge to Vicksburg (review)". The Journal of Southern History. 61 (1): 154–156. doi:10.2307/2211392. JSTOR 2211392.
