= Civil War History =

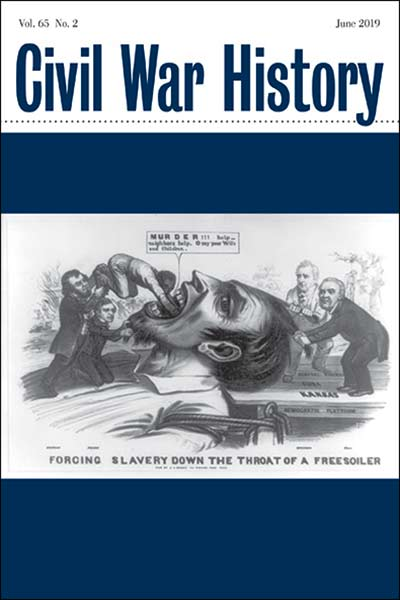
- Discipline: History
- Language: English
- Edited by: Brian Craig Miller

Publication details
- History: Established 1955; transferred to Kent State Univ Press in 1968
- Publisher: Kent State University Press (United States)
- Frequency: quarterly
- Open access: No

Standard abbreviations
- ISO 4: Civ. War Hist.

Indexing
- ISSN: 0009-8078 (print); 1533-6271 (web)
- LCCN: 57-2353
- OCLC no.: 1554809

Links
- Journal homepage

Civil War History is an academic journal of the American Civil War. It was established in 1955 at the State University of Iowa and is published quarterly by Kent State University Press. Topics covered in this journal include slavery and abolition, antebellum and Reconstruction politics, diplomacy, social and cultural developments, and military history. Notable contributors include Stephen Ambrose, Charles B. Dew, Gary W. Gallagher, James M. McPherson, Mark E. Neely Jr., James I. Robertson Jr., and T. Harry Williams.

== Indexing ==
Civil War History is abstracted and indexed in the following bibliographic databases:

- Academic OneFile
- Academic Search
- America: History and Life
- Arts & Humanities Citation Index
- Current Contents - Arts & Humanities
- ERIH PLUS
- Historical Abstracts
- Humanities International Index
- Humanities Source
- MLA International Bibliography
- Periodicals Index Online
- Project MUSE
- ProQuest Central
- Scopus

== See also ==
- List of history journals
