= 1914 United States Senate elections =

- November 3, 1914
- Class 3

32 of the 96 seats in the United States Senate 49 seats needed for a majority
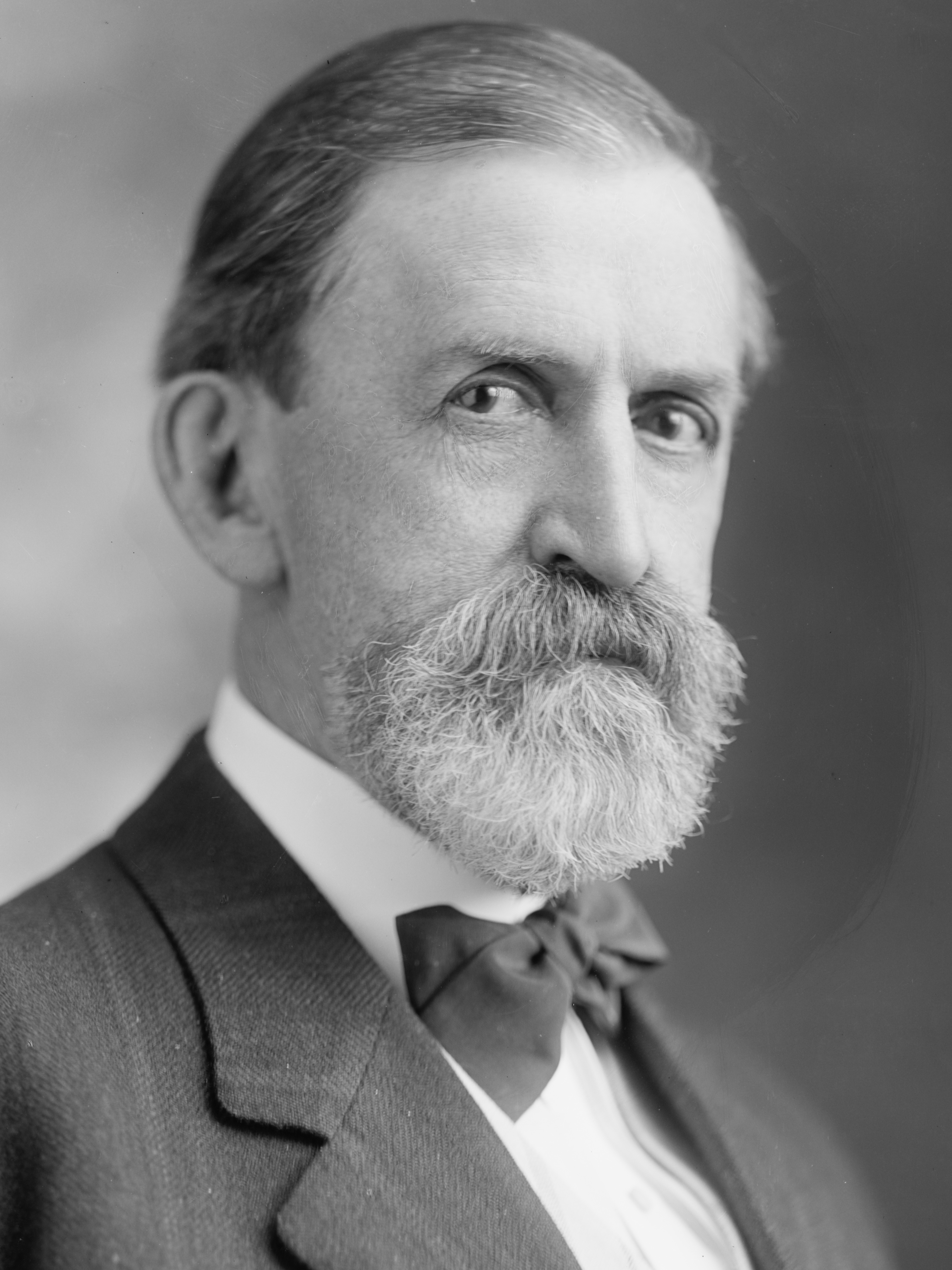

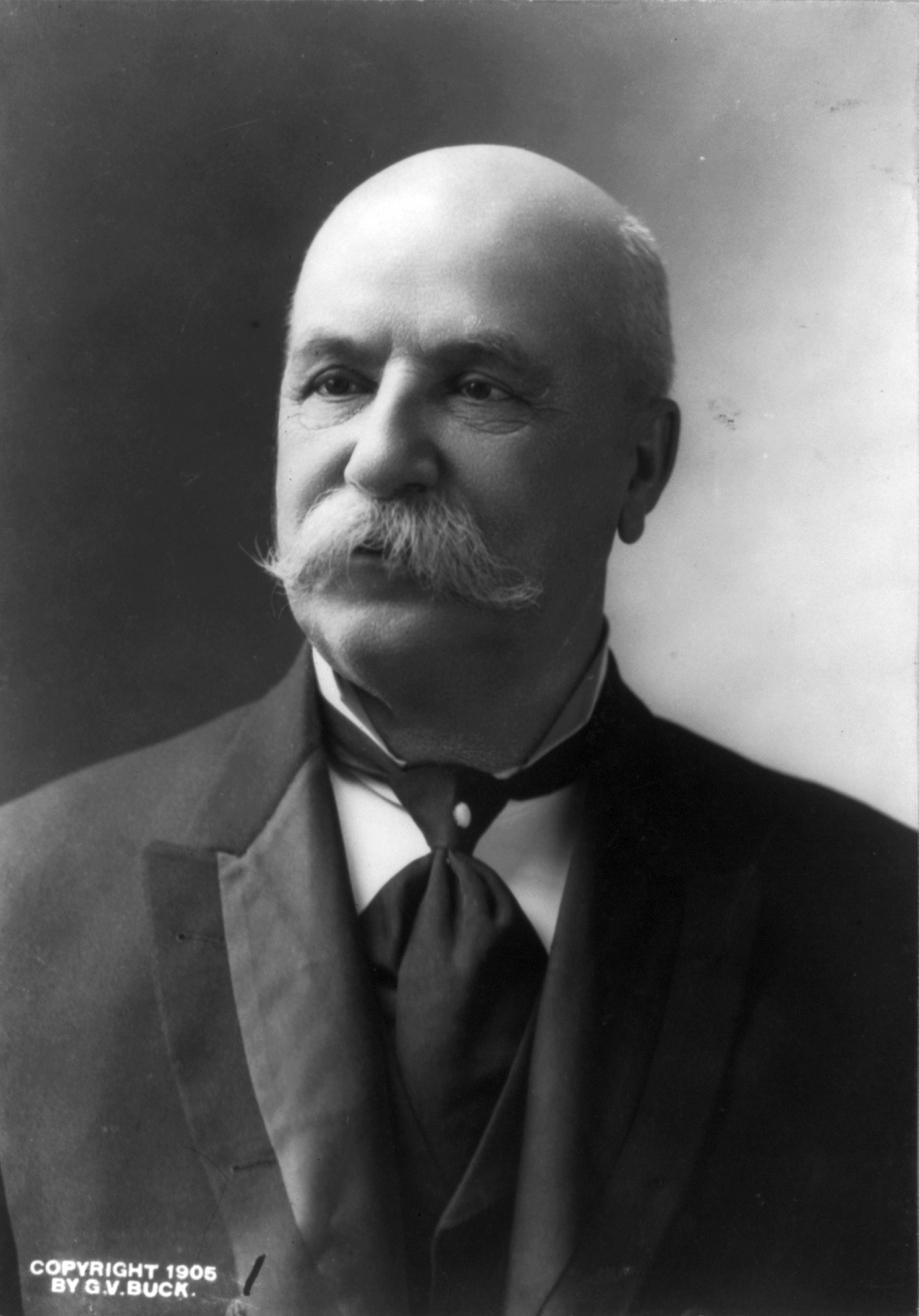
| | Majority party | Minority party |
|---|---|---|
| Leader | John W. Kern (Note: as Democratic Conference Chairman) | Jacob H. Gallinger (Note: as Republican Conference Chairman) |
| Party | Democratic | Republican |
| Leader since | March 4, 1911 | March 4, 1911 |
| Leader's seat | Indiana | New Hampshire |
| Seats before | 53 | 42 |
| Seats after | 56 | 39 |
| Seat change | ▲3 | ▼3 |
| Seats up | 17 | 16 |
| Races won | 20 | 13 |
| | Third party |
| Party | Progressive |
| Seats before | 1 |
| Seats after | 1 |
| Seat change | Steady |
| Seats up | 0 |
| Races won | 0 |
- Results of the elections: Democratic gain Democratic hold Republican hold No election
Majority conference chairman before election
John W. Kern
Democratic
Elected Majority conference chairman
John W. Kern
Democratic

The 1914 United States Senate elections were held on November 3, 1914. These were the first regularly scheduled elections held following the ratification of the Seventeenth Amendment to the United States Constitution in 1913, which required that all seats up for election be popularly elected, rather than chosen by their state legislatures. Thus, it was the first time that elections were generally scheduled on Election Day to coincide with the U.S. House elections. The 32 seats of Class 3 were contested in regular elections in 1914. Special elections were also held to fill vacancies. These elections occurred in the middle of Democratic President Woodrow Wilson's first term.

After a series of special elections, Democrats entered the election with a 53–42 majority, which they expanded to 56–39 after the elections.

This is one of five elections since 1914 in which the president's party gained Senate seats but lost House seats, something that would be repeated by Democrats in 1962 and 2022 and by Republicans in 1970 and 2018. This was the last time until 2022 that no incumbent senator lost reelection in a general election, although two lost in party primaries. This was also the first of three times in American history that the opposition party failed to flip any Senate seats, along with 1934 and 2022.

== Gains, losses, and holds ==
=== Retirements ===
Four Republicans and three Democrats retired instead of seeking re-election. One Democrat retired instead of seeking election to finish the unexpired term.

| State | Senator | Replaced by |
|---|---|---|
| Alabama | Francis S. White | Oscar Underwood |
| California | George Clement Perkins | James D. Phelan |
| Georgia (special) | William West | Thomas W. Hardwick |
| Kentucky | Johnson N. Camden Jr. | J. C. W. Beckham |
| Louisiana | John Thornton | Robert F. Broussard |
| New York | Elihu Root | James W. Wadsworth Jr. |
| Ohio | Theodore E. Burton | Warren G. Harding |
| Wisconsin | Isaac Stephenson | Paul O. Husting |

=== Defeats ===
==== Primary elections ====
Two Republicans sought re-election but lost renomination in their primary elections.

| State | Senator | Replaced by |
|---|---|---|
| Kansas | Joseph L. Bristow | Charles Curtis |
| South Dakota | Coe I. Crawford | Edwin S. Johnson |

=== Deaths ===
One Democrat died on August 8, 1913, and his seat remained vacant until a May 11, 1914 special election.

| State | Senator | Replaced by |
|---|---|---|
| Alabama (special) | Joseph F. Johnston | Francis S. White |

=== Post-election changes ===
One Democrat died during the 64th Congress and was replaced by a Democratic appointee.

| State | Senator | Replaced by |
|---|---|---|
| Indiana (Class 3) | Benjamin F. Shively | Thomas Taggart |

== Change in composition ==
=== Before the elections ===
| | | D_{1} | D_{2} | D_{3} | D_{4} | D_{5} | D_{6} | D_{7} | D_{8} |
| D_{18} | D_{17} | D_{16} | D_{15} | D_{14} | D_{13} | D_{12} | D_{11} | D_{10} | D_{9} |
| D_{19} | D_{20} | D_{21} | D_{22} | D_{23} | D_{24} | D_{25} | D_{26} | D_{27} | D_{28} |
| D_{38} Ariz. Ran | D_{37} Ala. (sp); Died; Ala. (reg); Retired | D_{36} | D_{35} | D_{34} | D_{33} | D_{32} | D_{31} | D_{30} | D_{29} |
| D_{39} Ark. Ran | D_{40} Colo. Ran | D_{41} Fla. Ran | D_{42} Ga. (reg); Ran | D_{43} Ga. (sp); Retired | D_{44} Ind. Ran | D_{45} Ky. (sp); Ran Ky. (reg); Retired | D_{46} La. Retired | D_{47} Md. Ran | D_{48} Mo. Ran |
| Majority → | | | | | | | | | D_{49} Nev. Ran |
| R_{39} Utah; Ran | R_{40} Vt. Ran | R_{41} Wash. Ran | R_{42} Wisc. Ran | P_{1} | D_{53} S.C. Ran | D_{52} Ore. Ran | D_{51} Okla. Ran | D_{50} N.C. Ran | D_{49} Nev. Ran |
| R_{38} S.D. Ran | R_{37} Pa. Ran | R_{36} Ohio; Retired | R_{35} N.D. Ran | R_{34} N.Y. Retired | R_{33} N.H. Ran | R_{32} Kan. Ran | R_{31} Iowa; Ran | R_{30} Ill. Ran | R_{29} Idaho; Ran |
| R_{19} | R_{20} | R_{21} | R_{22} | R_{23} | R_{24} | R_{25} | R_{26} | R_{27} Calif. Retired | R_{28} Conn. Ran |
| R_{18} | R_{17} | R_{16} | R_{15} | R_{14} | R_{13} | R_{12} | R_{11} | R_{10} | R_{9} |
| | | R_{1} | R_{2} | R_{3} | R_{4} | R_{5} | R_{6} | R_{7} | R_{8} |

=== Elections results ===
| | | D_{1} | D_{2} | D_{3} | D_{4} | D_{5} | D_{6} | D_{7} | D_{8} |
| D_{18} | D_{17} | D_{16} | D_{15} | D_{14} | D_{13} | D_{12} | D_{11} | D_{10} | D_{9} |
| D_{19} | D_{20} | D_{21} | D_{22} | D_{23} | D_{24} | D_{25} | D_{26} | D_{27} | D_{28} |
| D_{38} Ariz. Re-elected | D_{37} Ala. (sp); Hold; Ala. (reg); Hold | D_{36} | D_{35} | D_{34} | D_{33} | D_{32} | D_{31} | D_{30} | D_{29} |
| D_{39} Ark. Re-elected | D_{40} Calif. Gain | D_{41} Colo. Re-elected | D_{42} Fla. Re-elected | D_{43} Ga. (reg); Re-elected | D_{44} Ga. (sp); Hold | D_{45} Ind. Re-elected | D_{46} Ky. (sp); Elected (Note: Appointee elected) Ky. (reg); Hold | D_{47} La. Hold | D_{48} Md. Re-elected |
| Majority → | | | | | | | | | D_{49} Mo. Re-elected |
| R_{39} Wash. Re-elected | P_{1} | D_{56} Wisc. Gain | D_{55} S.D. Gain | D_{54} S.C. Re-elected | D_{53} Ore. Re-elected | D_{52} Okla. Re-elected | D_{51} N.C. Re-elected | D_{50} Nev. Re-elected | D_{49} Mo. Re-elected |
| R_{38} Vt. Re-elected | R_{37} Utah; Re-elected | R_{36} Pa. Re-elected | R_{35} Ohio; Hold | R_{34} N.D. Re-elected | R_{33} N.Y. Hold | R_{32} N.H. Re-elected | R_{31} Kan. Hold | R_{30} Iowa; Re-elected | R_{29} Ill. Re-elected |
| R_{19} | R_{20} | R_{21} | R_{22} | R_{23} | R_{24} | R_{25} | R_{26} | R_{27} Conn. Re-elected | R_{28} Idaho; Re-elected |
| R_{18} | R_{17} | R_{16} | R_{15} | R_{14} | R_{13} | R_{12} | R_{11} | R_{10} | R_{9} |
| | | R_{1} | R_{2} | R_{3} | R_{4} | R_{5} | R_{6} | R_{7} | R_{8} |

=== Beginning of the next Congress ===
| | | D_{1} | D_{2} | D_{3} | D_{4} | D_{5} | D_{6} | D_{7} | D_{8} |
| D_{18} | D_{17} | D_{16} | D_{15} | D_{14} | D_{13} | D_{12} | D_{11} | D_{10} | D_{9} |
| D_{19} | D_{20} | D_{21} | D_{22} | D_{23} | D_{24} | D_{25} | D_{26} | D_{27} | D_{28} |
| D_{38} | D_{37} | D_{36} | D_{35} | D_{34} | D_{33} | D_{32} | D_{31} | D_{30} | D_{29} |
| D_{39} | D_{40} | D_{41} | D_{42} | D_{43} | D_{44} | D_{45} | D_{46} | D_{47} | D_{48} |
| Majority → | | | | | | | | | D_{49} |
| R_{39} | R_{40} Gain (Note: Miles Poindexter of Washington changed from Progressive to Republican.) | D_{56} | D_{55} | D_{54} | D_{53} | D_{52} | D_{51} | D_{50} | D_{49} |
| R_{38} | R_{37} | R_{36} | R_{35} | R_{34} | R_{33} | R_{32} | R_{31} | R_{30} | R_{29} |
| R_{19} | R_{20} | R_{21} | R_{22} | R_{23} | R_{24} | R_{25} | R_{26} | R_{27} | R_{28} |
| R_{18} | R_{17} | R_{16} | R_{15} | R_{14} | R_{13} | R_{12} | R_{11} | R_{10} | R_{9} |
| | | R_{1} | R_{2} | R_{3} | R_{4} | R_{5} | R_{6} | R_{7} | R_{8} |

Key

| D_{#} | Democratic |
| P_{#} | Progressive |
| R_{#} | Republican |
| V_{#} | Vacant |

== Summary of races ==
=== Special elections during the 63rd Congress ===
In these special elections, the winners were seated once elected and qualified; ordered by election date.

| State | Incumbent | | | Results | Candidates |
| State | Senator | Party | Electoral history | Results | Candidates |
|---|---|---|---|---|---|
| Alabama (Class 3) | Vacant | | | Joseph F. Johnston (D) died August 8, 1913. New senator elected May 11, 1914. Democratic hold. | ▌ ✓ Frank White (Democratic); Unopposed |
| Georgia (Class 2) | William West | Democratic | 1914 (appointed) | Appointee retired. New senator elected November 3, 1914. Democratic hold. | ▌ ✓ Thomas W. Hardwick (Democratic) 68.96%; ▌G. R. Hutchins (Progressive) 31.04% |
| Kentucky (Class 3) | Johnson N. Camden Jr. | Democratic | 1914 (appointed) | Interim appointee elected November 3, 1914. Winner did not run for the next term, see below. | ▌ ✓ Johnson N. Camden Jr. (Democratic) 53.98%; ▌William Marshall Bullitt (Republican) 40.43% |

=== Races leading to the 64th Congress ===
In these general elections, the winners were elected for the term beginning March 4, 1915; ordered by state.

All of the elections involved the Class 3 seats.

| State | Incumbent | | | Results | Candidates |
| State | Senator | Party | Electoral history | Results | Candidates |
|---|---|---|---|---|---|
| Alabama | Frank White | Democratic | 1914 (special) | Incumbent retired. New senator elected. Democratic hold. | ▌ ✓ Oscar Underwood (Democratic) 90.2%; ▌Alex Birch (Republican) 6.8%; Others: ▌Adolphus Longshore (Progressive) 2.35%; ▌S. F. Hinton (Socialist) 0.64% |
| Arizona | Marcus A. Smith | Democratic | 1912 | Incumbent re-elected. | ▌ ✓ Marcus A. Smith (Democratic) 53.23%; ▌J. Lorenzo Hubbell (Republican) 18.95%; ▌Eugene W. Chafin (Prohibition) 15.05%; ▌Bert Davis (Socialist) 7.39%; ▌J. Bernard Nelson (Progressive) 5.38% |
| Arkansas | James P. Clarke | Democratic | 1903; 1909 | Incumbent re-elected. | ▌ ✓ James P. Clarke (Democratic) 74.88%; ▌Harry H. Myers (Republican) 25.12% |
| California | George C. Perkins | Republican | 1893 (appointed); 1895 (special); 1897; 1903; 1909 | Incumbent retired. New senator elected. Democratic gain. | ▌ ✓ James D. Phelan (Democratic) 31.59%; ▌Francis J. Heney (Progressive) 28.81%; ▌Joseph R. Knowland (Republican) 28.69%; ▌Ernest Untermann (Socialist) 6.41%; ▌Frederick F. Wheeler (Prohibition) 4.51% |
| Colorado | Charles S. Thomas | Democratic | 1913 (special) | Incumbent re-elected. | ▌ ✓ Charles S. Thomas (Democratic) 40.3%; ▌Hubert Work (Republican) 38.99%; ▌Benjamin Griffith (Progressive) 10.69%; ▌J. C. Griffiths (Socialist) 5.51%; ▌George John Kindel (Independent) 4.52% |
| Connecticut | Frank B. Brandegee | Republican | 1905 (special); 1909 | Incumbent re-elected. | ▌ ✓ Frank B. Brandegee (Republican) 49.77%; ▌Simeon E. Baldwin (Democratic) 42.08%; ▌Herbert Smith (Progressive) 3.79%; ▌George Spiess (Socialist) 3.26%; Others: ▌Frederick Platt (Prohibition) 0.75%; ▌Clarence Warner (Socialist Labor) 0.36% |
| Florida | Duncan U. Fletcher | Democratic | 1909 (appointed); 1909 (special) | Incumbent re-elected. | ▌ ✓ Duncan U. Fletcher (Democratic); Unopposed |
| Georgia | Hoke Smith | Democratic | 1911 (special) | Incumbent re-elected. | ▌ ✓ Hoke Smith (Democratic) 68.48%; ▌C. W. McClure (Republican) 31.52% |
| Idaho | James H. Brady | Republican | 1913 (special) | Incumbent re-elected. | ▌ ✓ James H. Brady (Republican) 43.89%; ▌James H. Hawley (Democratic) 38.14%; ▌Paul Clagstone (Progressive) 9.54%; ▌Calistus Cooper (Socialist) 7.29%; ▌W. M. Duthie (Prohibition) 1.14% |
| Illinois | Lawrence Y. Sherman | Republican | 1913 (special) | Incumbent re-elected. | ▌ ✓ Lawrence Y. Sherman (Republican) 38.46%; ▌Roger Charles Sullivan (Democratic) 36.76%; ▌Raymond Robins (Progressive) 19.99%; ▌Adolph Gernies (Socialist) 3.93%; Others: ▌George Woolsey (Prohibition) 0.66%; ▌John M. Francis (Socialist Labor) 0.21% |
| Indiana | Benjamin F. Shively | Democratic | 1909 | Incumbent re-elected. | ▌ ✓ Benjamin F. Shively (Democratic) 42.14%; ▌Hugh T. Miller (Republican) 35.1%; ▌Albert J. Beveridge (Progressive) 16.81%; ▌Stephen N. Reynolds (Socialist) 3.36%; Others: ▌Sumner Haynes (Prohibition) 2.15%; ▌James Matthews (Socialist Labor) 0.45% |
| Iowa | Albert B. Cummins | Republican | 1908 (special) | Incumbent re-elected. | ▌ ✓ Albert B. Cummins (Republican) 48.19%; ▌Maurice Connolly (Democratic) 39.16%; ▌Otis Spurgeon (Independent) 5.73%; ▌Casper Schenk (Progressive) 3.53%; Others: ▌I. S. McCullis (Socialist) 1.98%; ▌M. L. Christian (Prohibition) 1.41% |
| Kansas | Joseph L. Bristow | Republican | 1909 | Incumbent lost renomination. New senator elected. Republican hold. | ▌ ✓ Charles Curtis (Republican) 35.53%; ▌George A. Neeley (Democratic) 34.77%; ▌Victor Murdock (Progressive) 22.94%; ▌Christian B. Hoffman (Socialist) 4.82%; ▌Earle Delay (Prohibition) 1.94% |
| Kentucky | Johnson N. Camden Jr. | Democratic | 1914 (appointed); 1914 (special) | Interim appointee retired. New senator elected. Democratic hold. | ▌ ✓ J. C. W. Beckham (Democratic) 51.89%; ▌Augustus E. Willson (Republican) 42.53%; ▌Burton Vance (Progressive) 4.15%; ▌H. J. Robertson (Socialist) 1.44% |
| Louisiana | John Thornton | Democratic | 1910 (special) | Incumbent retired. New senator had already been elected early May 21, 1912. Democratic hold. | ▌ ✓ Robert F. Broussard (Democratic); Unopposed |
| Maryland | John W. Smith | Democratic | 1908 (special); 1908 | Incumbent re-elected. | ▌ ✓ John W. Smith (Democratic) 50.99%; ▌Edward C. Carrington Jr. (Republican) 43.89%; Others: ▌V. Milton Reichard (Progressive) 1.71%; ▌Charles Develin (Socialist) 1.51%; ▌Richard H. Holme (Prohibition) 1.46%; ▌Robert W. Stevens (Labor) 0.45% |
| Missouri | William J. Stone | Democratic | 1903; 1909 | Incumbent re-elected. | ▌ ✓ William J. Stone (Democratic) 50.41%; ▌Thomas J. Akins (Republican) 41.58%; ▌Arthur N. Sager (Progressive) 4.47%; ▌Thomas E. Greene (Socialist) 2.76%; Others: ▌Orange J. Hill (Prohibition) 0.59%; ▌J. W. Molineaux (Socialist Labor) 0.2% |
| Nevada | Francis G. Newlands | Democratic | 1909 | Incumbent re-elected. | ▌ ✓ Francis G. Newlands (Democratic) 37.46%; ▌Samuel Platt (Republican) 37.27%; ▌Ashley G. Miller (Socialist) 25.28% |
| New Hampshire | Jacob Gallinger | Republican | 1891; 1897; 1903; 1909 | Incumbent re-elected. | ▌ ✓ Jacob H. Gallinger (Republican) 51.66%; ▌Raymond B. Stevens (Democratic) 44.63%; Others: ▌Benjamin F. Grier (Prohibition) 2.38%; ▌William H. Wilkins (Socialist) 1.34% |
| New York | Elihu Root | Republican | 1909 | Incumbent retired. New senator elected. Republican hold. | ▌ ✓ James W. Wadsworth (Republican) 47.04%; ▌James W. Gerard (Democratic) 42.06%; ▌Bainbridge Colby (Progressive) 4.56%; ▌Charles Edward Russell (Socialist) 4.07%; Others: ▌Francis E. Baldwin (Prohibition) 2.05%; ▌Erwin Archer (Socialist Labor) 0.23% |
| North Carolina | Lee S. Overman | Democratic | 1903; 1909 | Incumbent re-elected. | ▌ ✓ Lee S. Overman (Democratic) 58.1%; ▌A. A. Whitener (Republican) 41.7%; ▌Henry J. Oliver (Socialist) 0.2% |
| North Dakota | Asle Gronna | Republican | 1911 (special) | Incumbent re-elected. | ▌ ✓ Asle Gronna (Republican) 55.82%; ▌William E. Purcell (Democratic) 33.95%; ▌W. H. Brown (Socialist) 7.14%; ▌Sever Serumgard (Independent) 3.1% |
| Ohio | Theodore E. Burton | Republican | 1909 | Incumbent retired. New senator elected. Republican hold. | ▌ ✓ Warren G. Harding (Republican) 49.16%; ▌Timothy S. Hogan (Democratic) 39.6%; ▌Arthur Lovett Garford (Progressive) 6.31%; ▌E. K. Hitchens (Socialist) 4.93% |
| Oklahoma | Thomas Gore | Democratic | 1907 (New state); 1909 | Incumbent re-elected. | ▌ ✓ Thomas Gore (Democratic) 47.98%; ▌John B. Campbell (Republican) 29.44%; ▌W. D. Cope (Socialist) 20.99%; ▌Luther Kyle (Prohibition) 1.59% |
| Oregon | George E. Chamberlain | Democratic | 1909 | Incumbent re-elected. | ▌ ✓ George E. Chamberlain (Democratic) 45.5%; ▌R. A. Booth (Republican) 35.95%; ▌Bill Hanley (Progressive) 10.68%; ▌Benjamin Ramp (Socialist) 4.34%; ▌H. S. Stine (Prohibition) 3.52% |
| Pennsylvania | Boies Penrose | Republican | 1897; 1903; 1909 | Incumbent re-elected. | ▌ ✓ Boies Penrose (Republican) 46.76%; ▌Gifford Pinchot (Progressive) 24.22%; ▌A. Mitchell Palmer (Democratic) 23.97%; ▌Frederick Whiteside (Socialist) 3.41%; Others: ▌Madison Larkin (Prohibition) 1.58%; ▌A. S. Landis (Socialist Labor) 0.06% |
| South Carolina | Ellison D. Smith | Democratic | 1909 | Incumbent re-elected. | ▌ ✓ Ellison D. Smith (Democratic) 99.7%; ▌James H. Roberts (Socialist) 0.3% |
| South Dakota | Coe I. Crawford | Republican | 1909 | Incumbent lost renomination. New senator elected. Democratic gain. | ▌ ✓ Edwin S. Johnson (Democratic) 48.32%; ▌Charles H. Burke (Republican) 44.47%; ▌E. P. Johnson (Socialist) 2.69%; Others: ▌O. W. Butterfield (Prohibition) 2.42%; ▌H. L. Loucks (Independent) 2.11% |
| Utah | Reed Smoot | Republican | 1903; 1909 | Incumbent re-elected. | ▌ ✓ Reed Smoot (Republican) 49.08%; ▌James Moyle (Democratic) 46.33%; ▌J. F. Parsons (Socialist) 4.59% |
| Vermont | William P. Dillingham | Republican | 1900 (special); 1902; 1908 | Incumbent re-elected. | ▌ ✓ William P. Dillingham (Republican) 56.05%; ▌Charles A. Prouty (Democratic) 42.69%; ▌James H. Canfield (Socialist) 1.23% |
| Washington | Wesley L. Jones | Republican | 1909 | Incumbent re-elected. | ▌ ✓ Wesley L. Jones (Republican) 37.79%; ▌William W. Black (Democratic) 26.57%; ▌Ole Hanson (Progressive) 24.12%; ▌Adam Barth (Socialist) 8.76%; ▌Arthur Caton (Prohibition) 2.77% |
| Wisconsin | Isaac Stephenson | Republican | 1907 (special); 1909 | Incumbent retired. New senator elected. Democratic gain. | ▌ ✓ Paul O. Husting (Democratic) 43.82%; ▌Francis E. McGovern (Republican) 43.5%; ▌Emil Seidel (Socialist) 9.67%; ▌Charles L. Hill (Prohibition) 3.01% |

== Closest races ==
Nineteen races had a margin of victory under 10%:

| State | Party of winner | Margin |
|---|---|---|
| Nevada | Democratic | 0.19% |
| Wisconsin | Democratic (flip) | 0.31% |
| Kansas | Republican | 0.77% |
| Colorado | Democratic | 1.31% |
| Illinois | Republican | 1.70% |
| Utah | Republican | 2.75% |
| California | Democratic (flip) | 2.78% |
| South Dakota | Democratic (flip) | 3.85% |
| New York | Republican | 4.98% |
| Idaho | Republican | 5.75% |
| New Hampshire | Republican | 7.03% |
| Indiana | Democratic | 7.04% |
| Maryland | Democratic | 7.10% |
| Connecticut | Republican | 7.69% |
| Missouri | Democratic | 8.83% (Note: Missouri was the "tipping-point state".) |
| Iowa | Republican | 9.03% |
| Kentucky (regular) | Democratic | 9.36% |
| Oregon | Democratic | 9.55% |
| Ohio | Republican | 9.57% |

== Alabama ==
=== Alabama (special) ===
1914 United States Senate special election in Alabama
- May 11, 1914
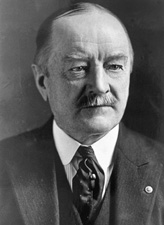
| Nominee | Frank White |
| Party | Democratic |
| Popular vote | 84,720 |
| Percentage | 99.93% |
U.S. senator before election
Joseph F. Johnston
Democratic
Elected U.S. senator
Frank White
Democratic

Incumbent Democratic U.S. Senator Joseph F. Johnston died August 8, 1913. Two appointees, Henry D. Clayton and Franklin P. Glass, were named to replace Johnston, but both faced challenges and were ultimately not seated. A special election was held to fill out the remaining months of Johnston's term. Attorney Frank White won the Democratic primary on April 6, 1914, and was elected unopposed in the special general election on May 11, 1914.

1914 United States Senate special election in Alabama
| Party | Candidate | Votes | % |
|---|---|---|---|
| Democratic | Frank White | 84,720 | 99.93% |
| Write-in | | 58 | 0.07% |
| Total votes | | 84,778 | 100.00% |
| Democratic hold | | | |

=== Alabama (regular) ===
1914 United States Senate election in Alabama
- November 3, 1914
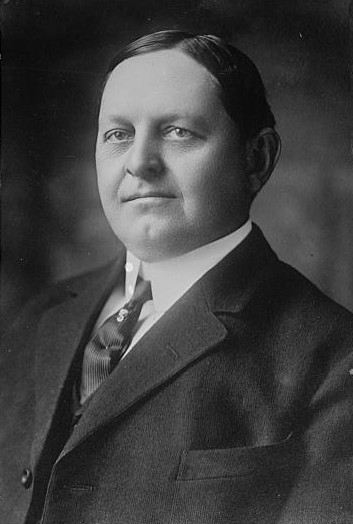

| Nominee | Oscar Underwood | Alex C. Birch |
| Party | Democratic | Republican |
| Popular vote | 63,389 | 12,320 |
| Percentage | 78.13% | 15.18% |
- County results Underwood: 40–50% 50–60% 60–70% 70–80% 80–90% >90% Birch: 40–50% 60–70% Longshore: 50–60%
U.S. senator before election
Frank White
Democratic
Elected U.S. senator
Oscar Underwood
Democratic

White declined to run in the regular election for a full term. U.S. Representative Oscar Underwood, the House Majority Leader, won the Democratic primary over Representative Richmond P. Hobson. He then defeated Alex C. Birch, the Republican nominee, in the general election.

1914 United States Senate election in Alabama
| Party | Candidate | Votes | % | ±% |
|---|---|---|---|---|
| Democratic | Oscar Underwood | 63,389 | 78.13% | −21.87% |
| Republican | Alex C. Birch | 12,320 | 15.18% | — |
| Progressive | Adolphus P. Longshore | 4,263 | 5.25% | — |
| Socialist | S. F. Hinton | 1,159 | 1.43% | — |
| Write-in | | 2 | 0.00% | — |
| Majority | | 51,069 | 62.94% | −37.06% |
| Total votes | | 81,133 | 100.00% | |
| Democratic hold | | | | |

== Arizona ==
1914 United States Senate election in Arizona
- November 3, 1914
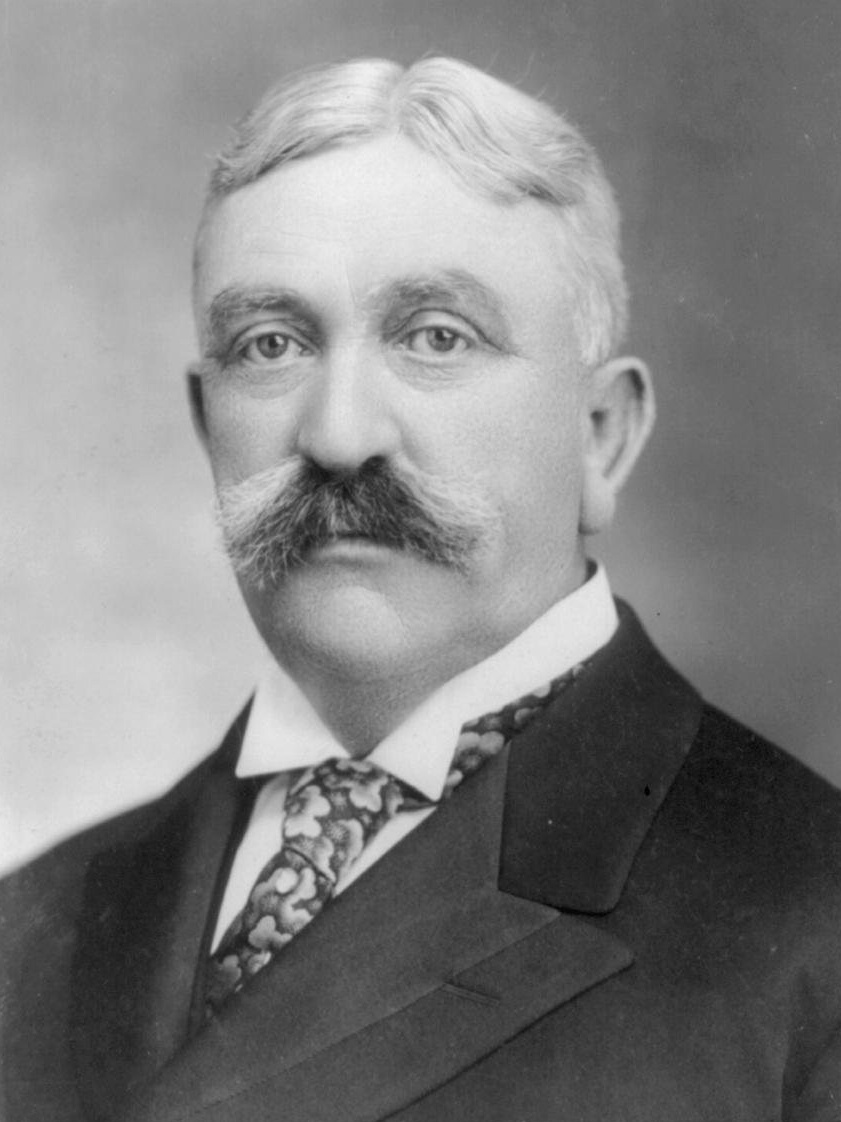

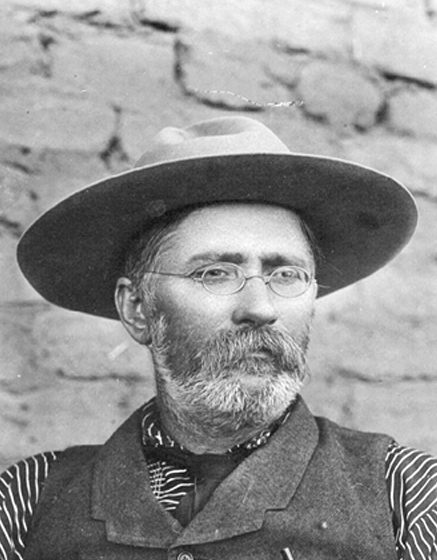

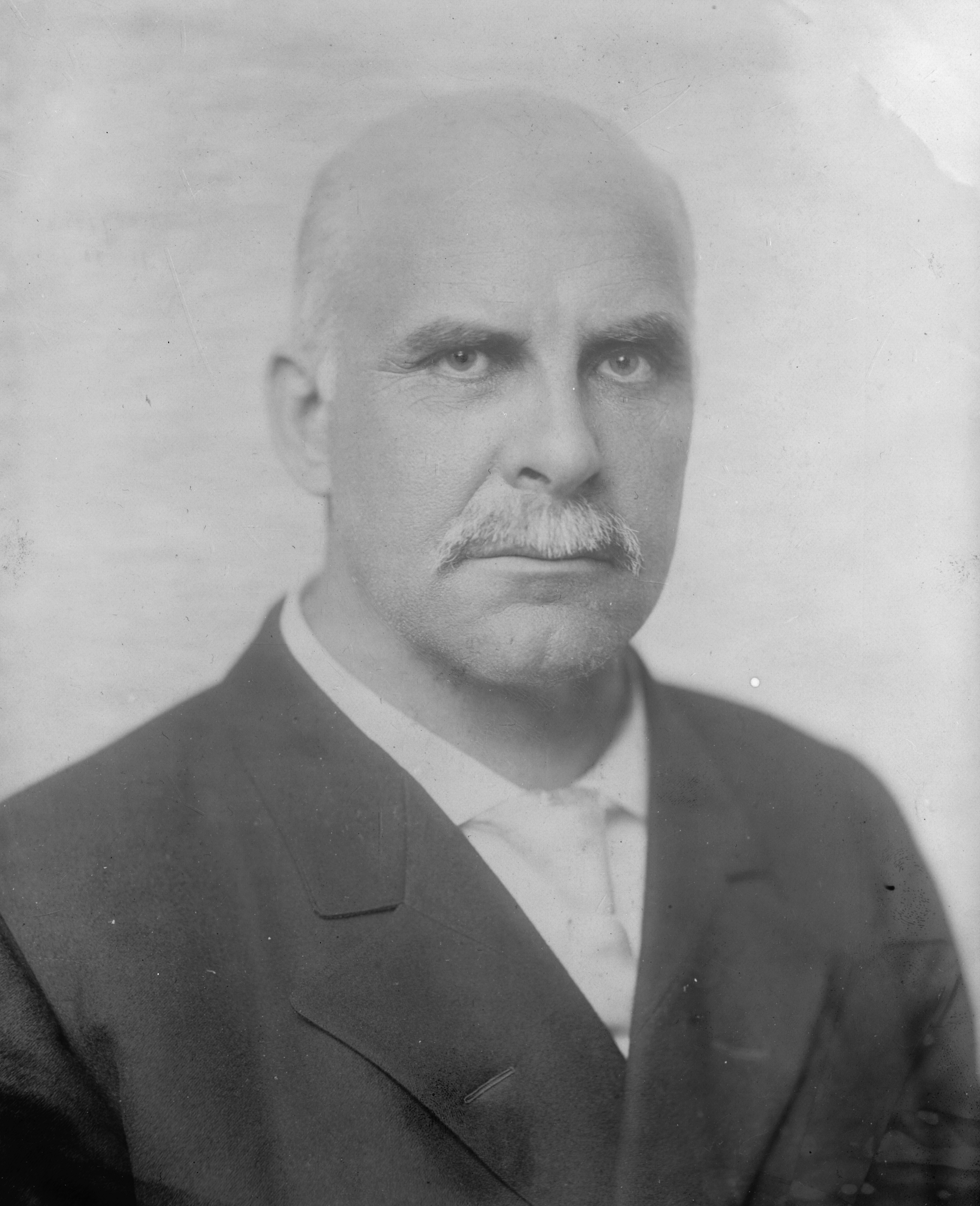
| Nominee | Marcus A. Smith | Don Lorenzo Hubbell |
| Party | Democratic | Republican |
| Popular vote | 25,800 | 9,183 |
| Percentage | 53.23% | 18.95% |
| Nominee | Eugene W. Chafin | Bert Davis |
| Party | Prohibition | Socialist |
| Popular vote | 7,293 | 3,582 |
| Percentage | 15.05% | 7.39% |
| Nominee | J. Bernard Nelson |
| Party | Progressive |
| Popular vote | 2,608 |
| Percentage | 5.38% |
- County results Smith: 40–50% 50–60% 60–70%
U.S. senator before election
Marcus A. Smith
Democratic
Elected U.S. senator
Marcus A. Smith
Democratic

Incumbent Democrat Marcus A. Smith was elected in 1912 with 50% of the vote and sought re-election. Although he easily defeated his primary challenger, he faced a large field of candidates in the general election. State Senator and trader Don Lorenzo Hubbell was the Republican nominee. Third-party candidates included Eugene W. Chafin of the Prohibition Party, who ran for president under the party's nomination, as well as Socialist Bert Davis and Progressive J. Bernard Nelson.

Smith received over half of the vote, defeating each candidate by a wide margin. He was elected to his second term.

Arizona election
| Party | Candidate | Votes | % |
|---|---|---|---|
| Democratic | Marcus A. Smith (incumbent) | 25,800 | 53.23 |
| Republican | Don Lorenzo Hubbell | 9,183 | 18.95 |
| Prohibition | Eugene W. Chafin | 7,293 | 15.05 |
| Socialist | Bert Davis | 3,582 | 7.39 |
| Progressive | J. Bernard Nelson | 2,608 | 5.38 |
| Majority | | 16,617 | 34.29 |
| Total votes | | 48,466 | 100.00 |
| Democratic hold | | | |

== Arkansas ==
1914 United States Senate election in Arkansas
- November 3, 1914
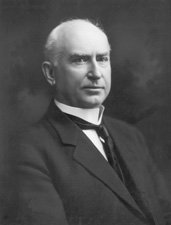

| Nominee | James P. Clarke | Harry H. Myers |
| Party | Democratic | Republican |
| Popular vote | 33,449 | 11,222 |
| Percentage | 74.88% | 25.12% |
- County results Clarke: 50–60% 60–70% 70–80% 80–90% >90% Myers: 50–60%
U.S. senator before election
James P. Clarke
Democratic
Elected U.S. senator
James P. Clarke
Democratic

Arkansas general election
| Party | Candidate | Votes | % |
|---|---|---|---|
| Democratic | James P. Clarke (incumbent) | 33,449 | 74.88 |
| Republican | Harry H. Myers | 11,222 | 25.12 |
| Majority | | 22,227 | 49.76 |
| Total votes | | 44,671 | 100.00 |
| Democratic hold | | | |

== California ==
1914 United States Senate election in California
- November 3, 1914
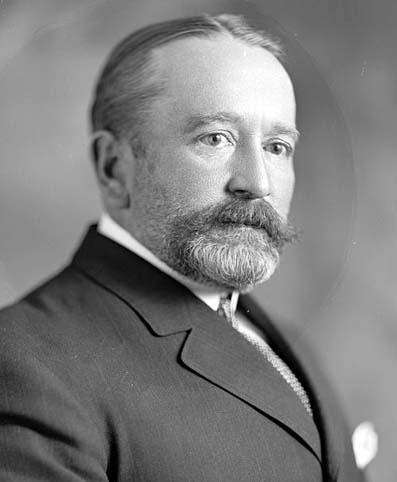

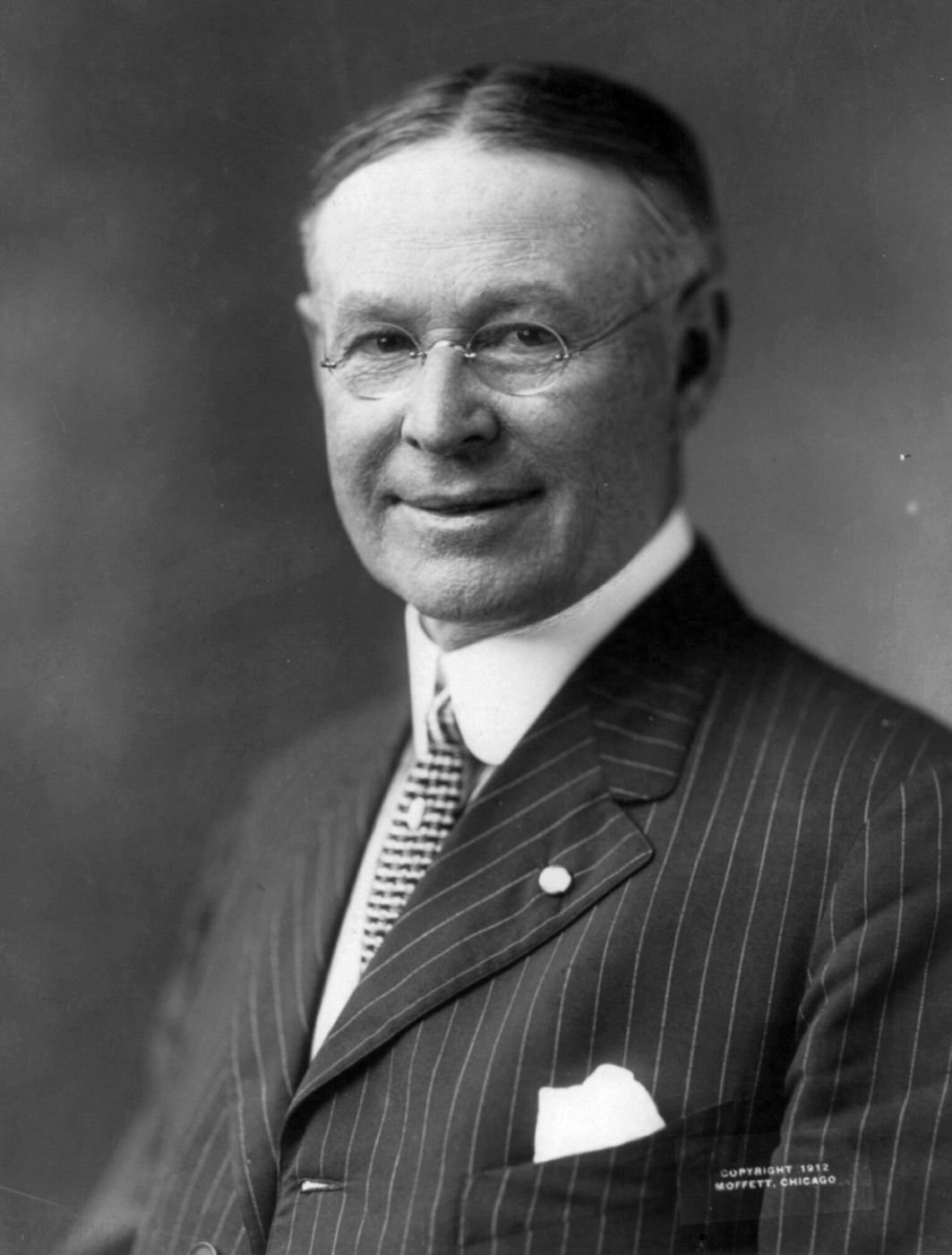

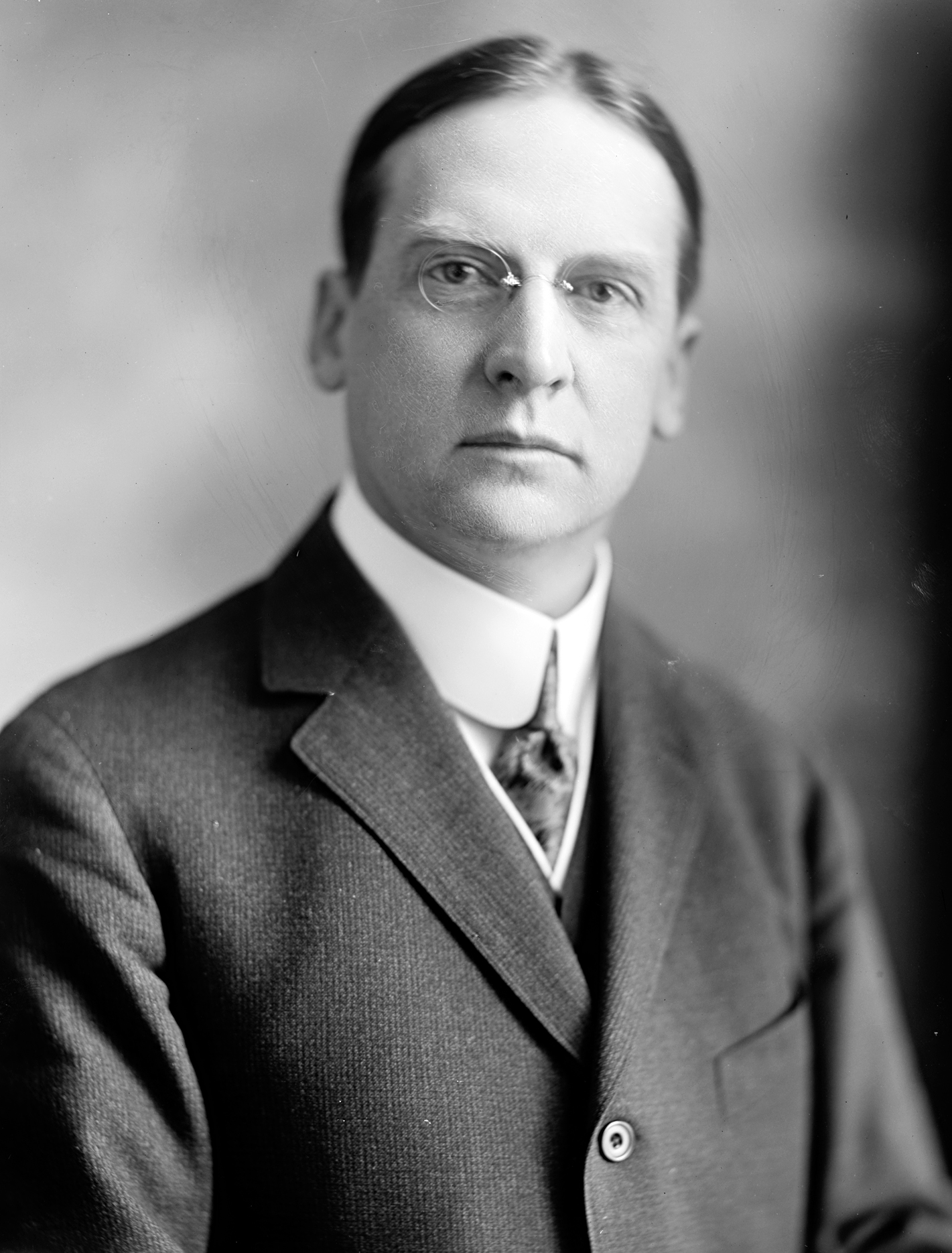

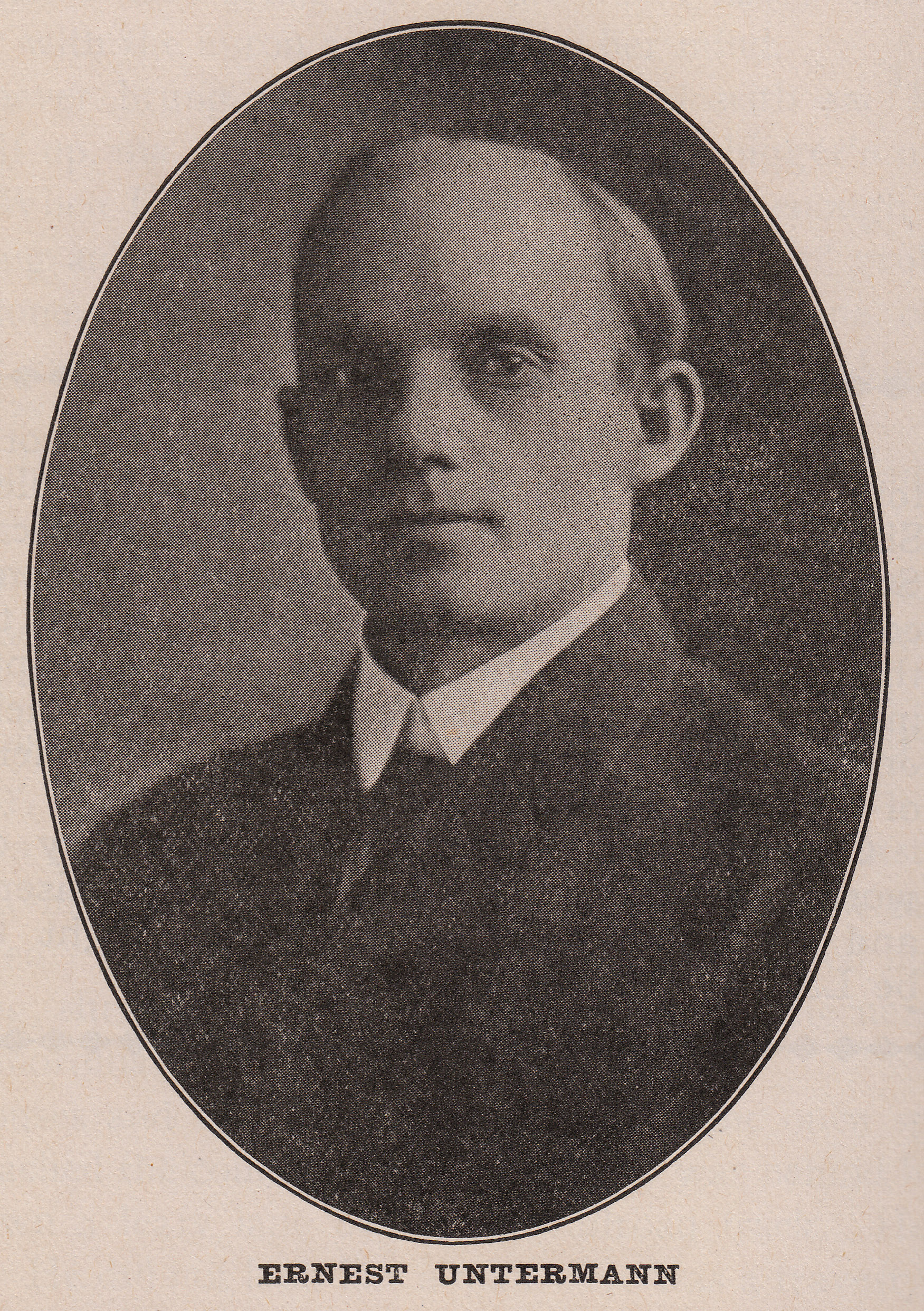
| Nominee | James Duval Phelan | Francis J. Heney |
| Party | Democratic | Progressive |
| Popular vote | 279,896 | 255,232 |
| Percentage | 31.59% | 28.81% |
| Nominee | Joseph R. Knowland | Ernest Untermann |
| Party | Republican | Socialist |
| Popular vote | 254,159 | 56,805 |
| Percentage | 28.69% | 6.41% |
- County results Phelan: <40% 40–50% 50–60% Heney: <40% Knowland: <40% 40–50%
U.S. senator before election
George Clement Perkins
Republican
Elected U.S. senator
James Duval Phelan
Democratic

Incumbent Republican George Clement Perkins was first elected in an 1895 special election and was re-elected for three more terms. He did not seek re-election.

U.S. Representative Joseph R. Knowland of Oakland was the Republican nominee for this seat in 1914. He was challenged by the Democratic nominee, former mayor of San Francisco James Duval Phelan, and Progressive nominee Francis J. Heney, the former attorney general of the Arizona Territory.

Phelan defeated Heney and Knowland by slim margins and with less than a third of the vote.

California election
| Party | Candidate | Votes | % |
|---|---|---|---|
| Democratic | James Duval Phelan | 279,896 | 31.59 |
| Progressive | Francis J. Heney | 255,232 | 28.81 |
| Republican | Joseph R. Knowland | 254,159 | 28.69 |
| Socialist | Ernest Untermann | 56,805 | 6.41 |
| Prohibition | Frederick F. Wheeler | 39,921 | 4.51 |
| Majority | | 24,664 | 2.78 |
| Total votes | | 886,013 | 100.00 |
| Democratic gain from Republican | | | |

== Colorado ==
1914 United States Senate election in Colorado
- November 3, 1914
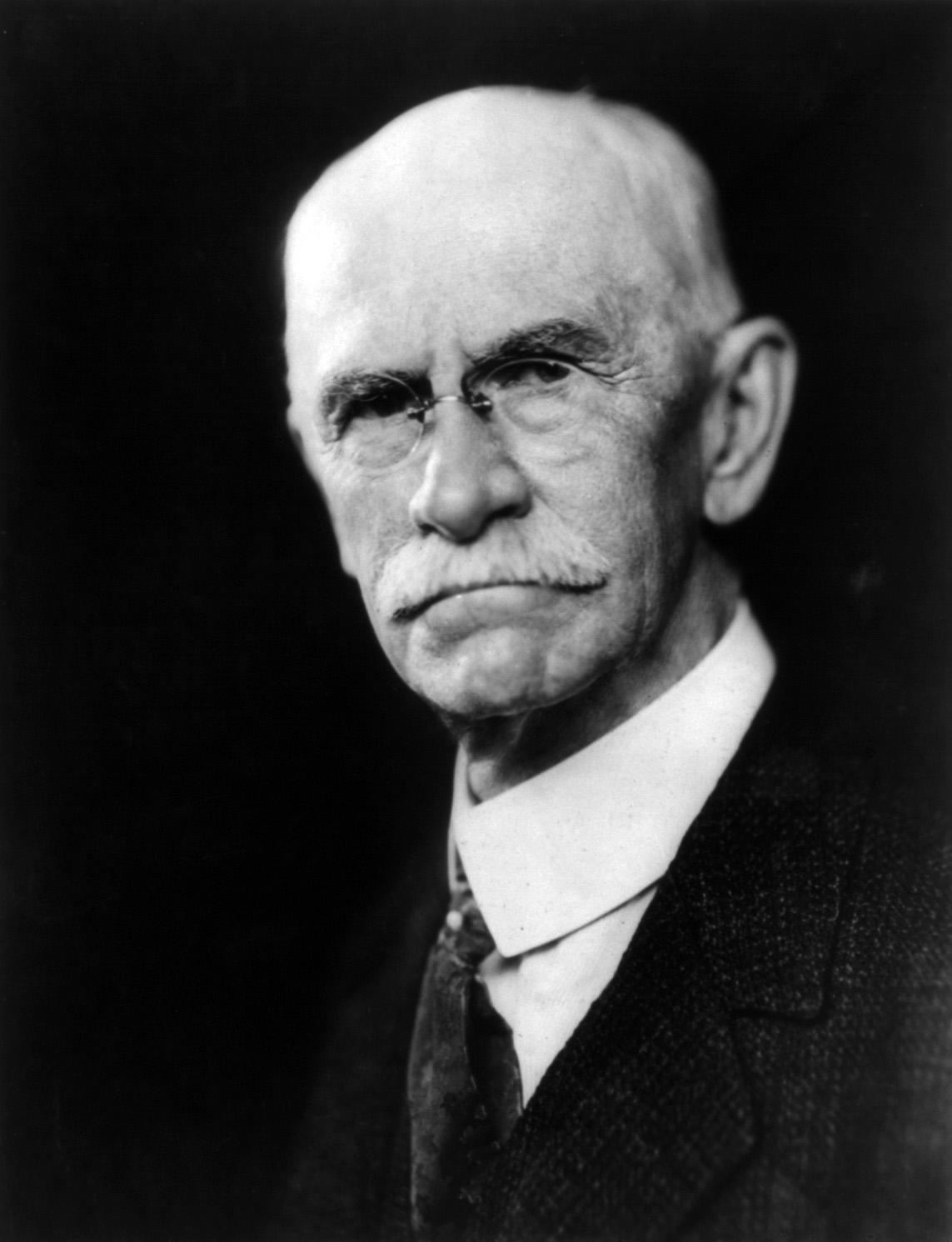

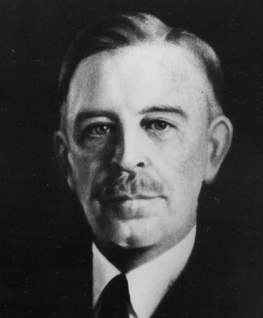

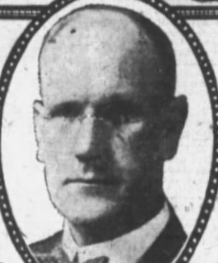
| Nominee | Charles S. Thomas | Hubert Work |
| Party | Democratic | Republican |
| Popular vote | 102,037 | 98,728 |
| Percentage | 40.30% | 38.99% |
| Nominee | Benjamin Griffith | James C. Griffiths |
| Party | Progressive | Socialist |
| Popular vote | 27,072 | 13,943 |
| Percentage | 10.69% | 5.51% |
- County results Thomas: 30–40% 40–50% 50–60% Work: 30–40% 40–50% 50–60% 60–70%
U.S. senator before election
Charles S. Thomas
Democratic
Elected U.S. senator
Charles S. Thomas
Democratic

Colorado election
| Party | Candidate | Votes | % |
|---|---|---|---|
| Democratic | Charles S. Thomas (incumbent) | 102,037 | 40.30 |
| Republican | Hubert Work | 98,728 | 38.99 |
| Progressive | Benjamin Griffith | 27,072 | 10.69 |
| Socialist | James C. Griffiths | 13,943 | 5.51 |
| Independent | George J. Kindel | 11,433 | 4.52 |
| Majority | | 3,309 | 1.31 |
| Total votes | | 253,213 | 100.00 |
| Democratic hold | | | |

== Connecticut ==
1914 United States Senate election in Connecticut
- November 3, 1914
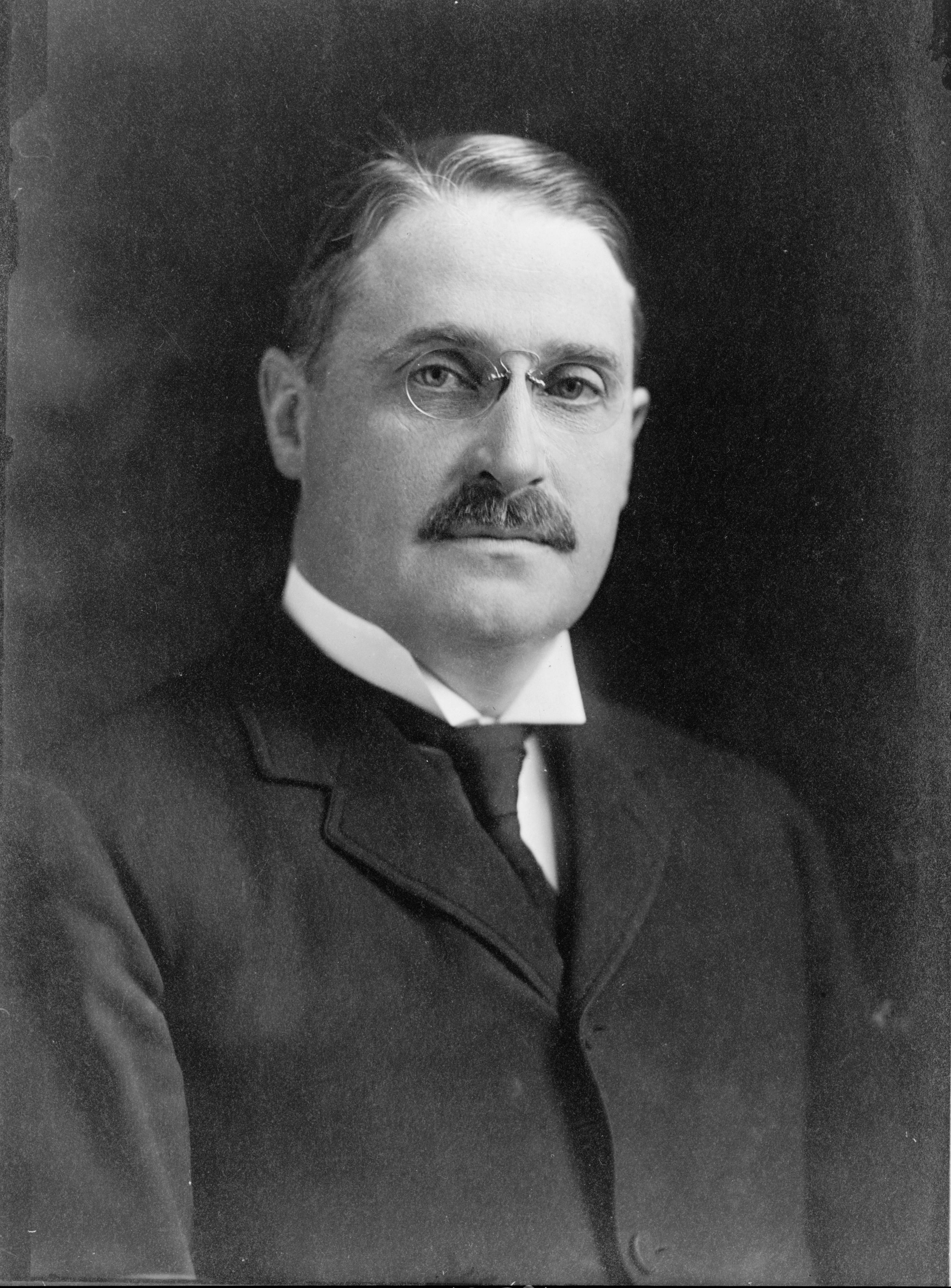

| Nominee | Frank B. Brandegee | Simeon E. Baldwin |
| Party | Republican | Democratic |
| Popular vote | 89,983 | 76,081 |
| Percentage | 49.77% | 42.08% |
- Brandegee: 40–50% 50–60% 60–70% 70–80% 80–90% Baldwin: 40–50% 50–60% 60–70%
U.S. senator before election
Frank B. Brandegee
Republican
Elected U.S. senator
Frank B. Brandegee
Republican

Connecticut election
| Party | Candidate | Votes | % |
|---|---|---|---|
| Republican | Frank B. Brandegee (incumbent) | 89,983 | 49.77 |
| Democratic | Simeon E. Baldwin | 76,081 | 42.08 |
| Progressive | Herbert Smith | 6,853 | 3.79 |
| Socialist | George Spiess | 5,890 | 3.26 |
| Prohibition | Frederick Platt | 1,356 | 0.75 |
| Socialist Labor | Clarence Warner | 650 | 0.36 |
| Majority | | 13,902 | 7.69 |
| Total votes | | 180,813 | 100.00 |
| Republican hold | | | |

== Florida ==
1914 United States Senate election in Florida
- November 3, 1914
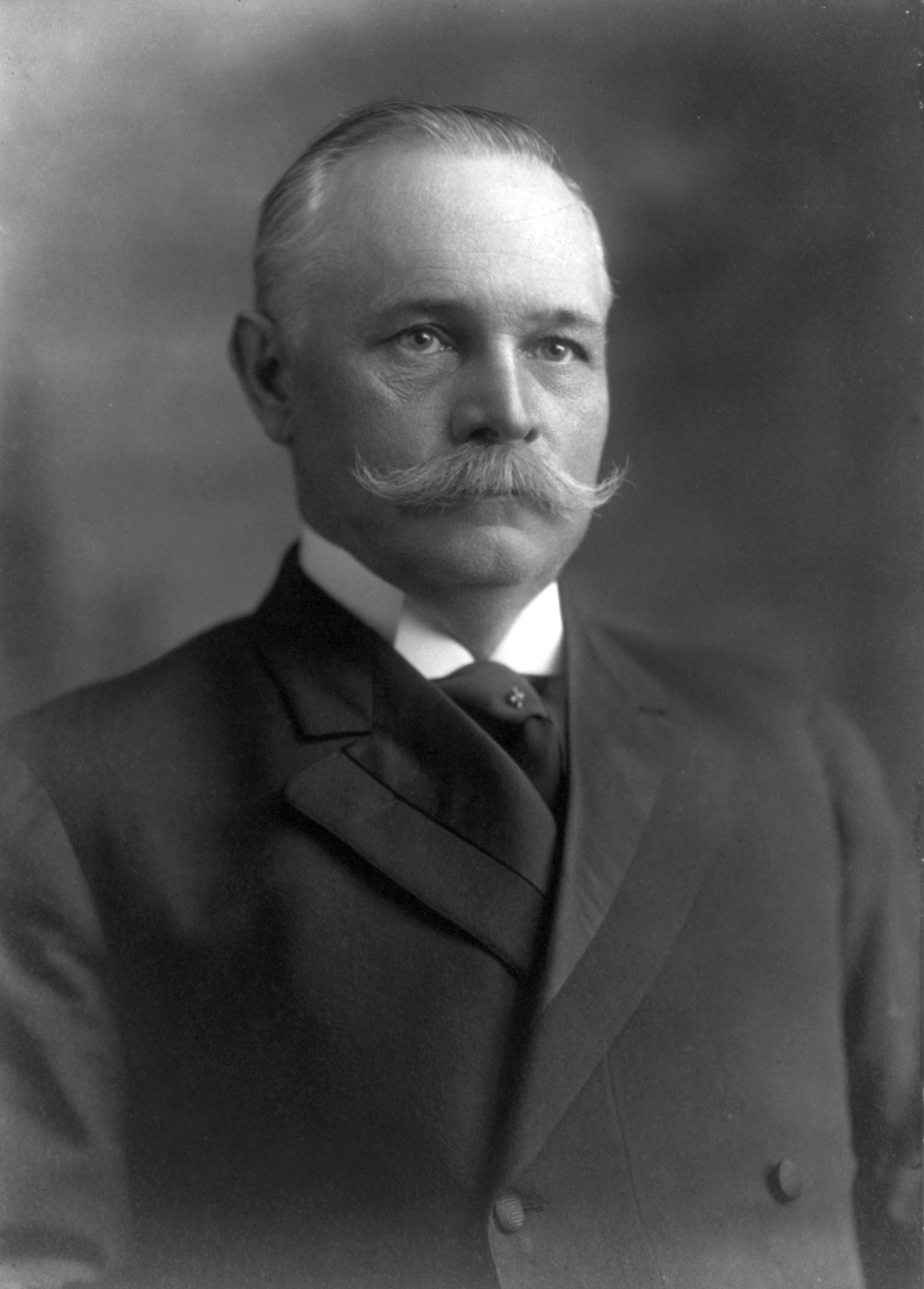

| Nominee | Duncan U. Fletcher | J. N. C. Stockton |
| Party | Democratic | Democratic |
| Popular vote | 32,042 | 21,733 |
| Percentage | 59.59% | 40.42% |
- County results Fletcher: 50–60% 60–70% 70–80% Stockton: 50–60% 70–80%
U.S. senator before election
Duncan U. Fletcher
Democratic
Elected U.S. senator
Duncan U. Fletcher
Democratic

Incumbent Democrat Duncan Fletcher was elected in a special election after being appointed when William Hall Milton retired after a year in office. He sought re-election to a full term, facing competition only in the primary.

Democratic primary
| Party | Candidate | Votes | % |
|---|---|---|---|
| Democratic | Duncan U. Fletcher (incumbent) | 32,042 | 59.59 |
| Democratic | J. N. C. Stockton | 21,733 | 40.42 |
| Majority | | 10,309 | 19.17 |
| Total votes | | 53,775 | 100.00 |

General election
| Party | Candidate | Votes | % |
|---|---|---|---|
| Democratic | Duncan U. Fletcher (incumbent) | 22,761 | 99.52 |
| N/A | Scattering | 110 | 0.48 |
| Majority | | 22,651 | 99.04 |
| Total votes | | 22,871 | 100.00 |

== Georgia ==
There were two elections due to the February 14, 1914, death of Democrat Augustus Octavius Bacon. It was the first time that both of Georgia's Senate seats have been up for election at the same time.

=== Georgia (special) ===
1914 United States Senate special election in Georgia
- November 3, 1914
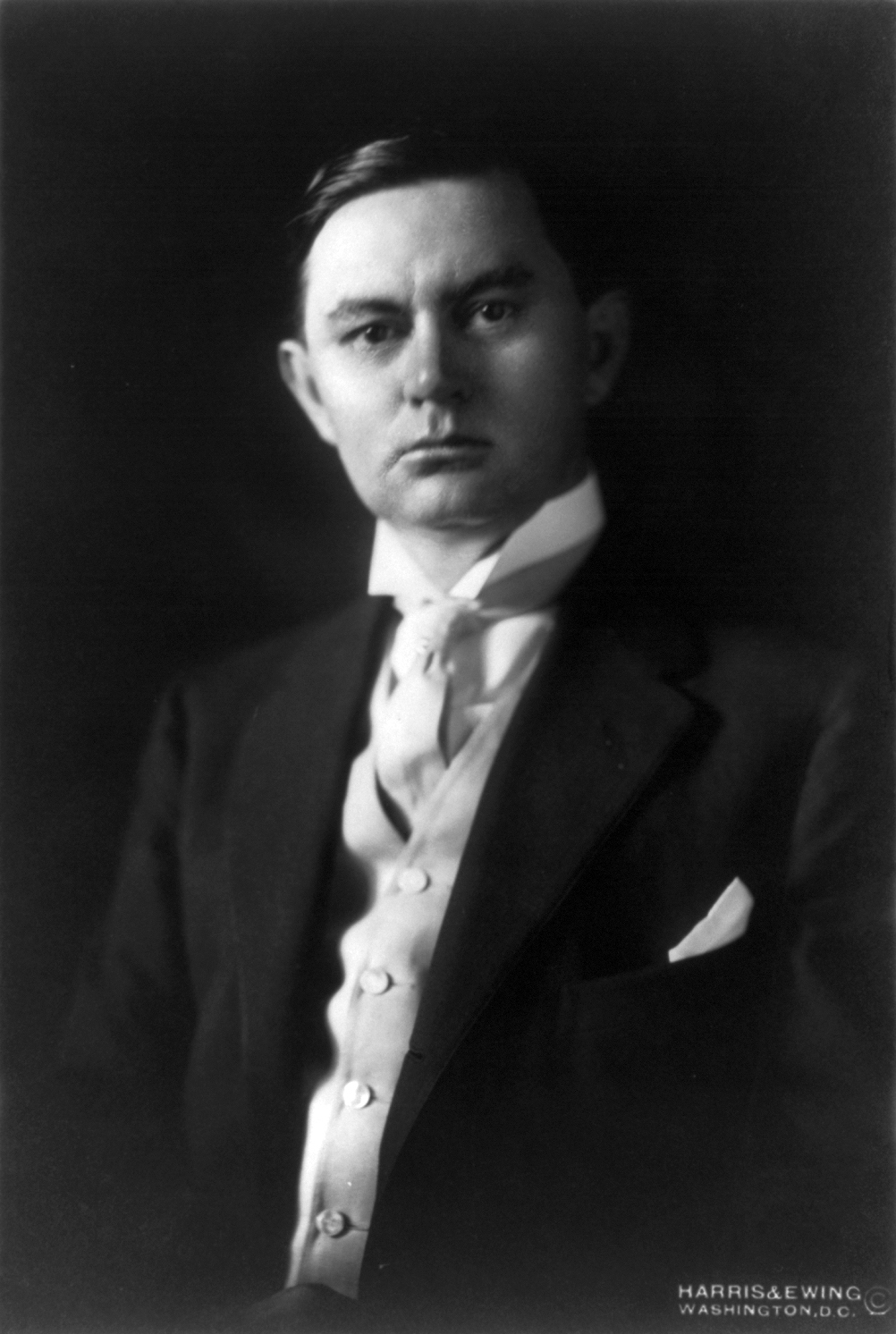

| Nominee | Thomas W. Hardwick | Rufe G. Hutchens |
| Party | Democratic | Progressive |
| Popular vote | 62,589 | 28,169 |
| Percentage | 68.96% | 31.04% |
- County results Hardwick: 50–60% 60–70% 70–80% 80–90% >90% Hutchens: 50–60% 60–70% 70–80% 80–90% No Vote
U.S. senator before election
William S. West
Democratic
Elected U.S. senator
Thomas W. Hardwick
Democratic

Democrat William West was appointed to continue the term pending a special election, in which he was not a candidate.

Democrat Thomas W. Hardwick was elected November 3, 1914, to finish the term that would end in 1919 and served until losing renomination in 1918.

Georgia election
| Party | Candidate | Votes | % |
|---|---|---|---|
| Democratic | Thomas W. Hardwick | 62,589 | 68.96 |
| Progressive | Rufe G. Hutchens | 28,169 | 31.04 |
| Majority | | 34,420 | 37.93 |
| Total votes | | 90,758 | 100.00 |
| Democratic hold | | | |

=== Georgia (regular) ===
1914 United States Senate election in Georgia
- November 3, 1914
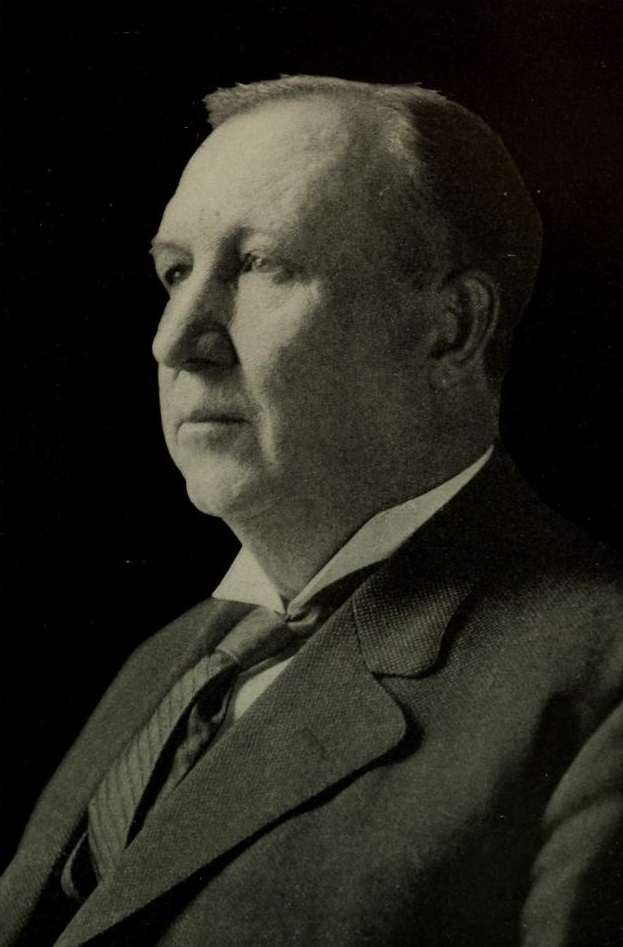

| Nominee | M. Hoke Smith | C. W. McClure |
| Party | Democratic | Progressive |
| Popular vote | 61,789 | 28,441 |
| Percentage | 68.48% | 31.52% |
- County results Smith: 50–60% 60–70% 70–80% 80–90% >90% McClure: 50–60% 60–70% 70–80% 80–90% No Vote
U.S. senator before election
M. Hoke Smith
Democratic
Elected U.S. senator
M. Hoke Smith
Democratic

Democrat M. Hoke Smith, who had first won in a 1911 special election, was re-elected and would serve until his 1920 renomination loss.

Georgia election
| Party | Candidate | Votes | % |
|---|---|---|---|
| Democratic | M. Hoke Smith (incumbent) | 61,789 | 68.48 |
| Progressive | C. W. McClure | 28,441 | 31.52 |
| Majority | | 33,348 | 36.96 |
| Total votes | | 90,230 | 100.00 |
| Democratic hold | | | |

== Idaho ==
1914 United States Senate election in Idaho
- November 3, 1914
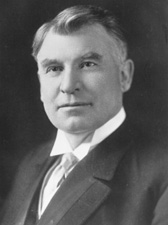

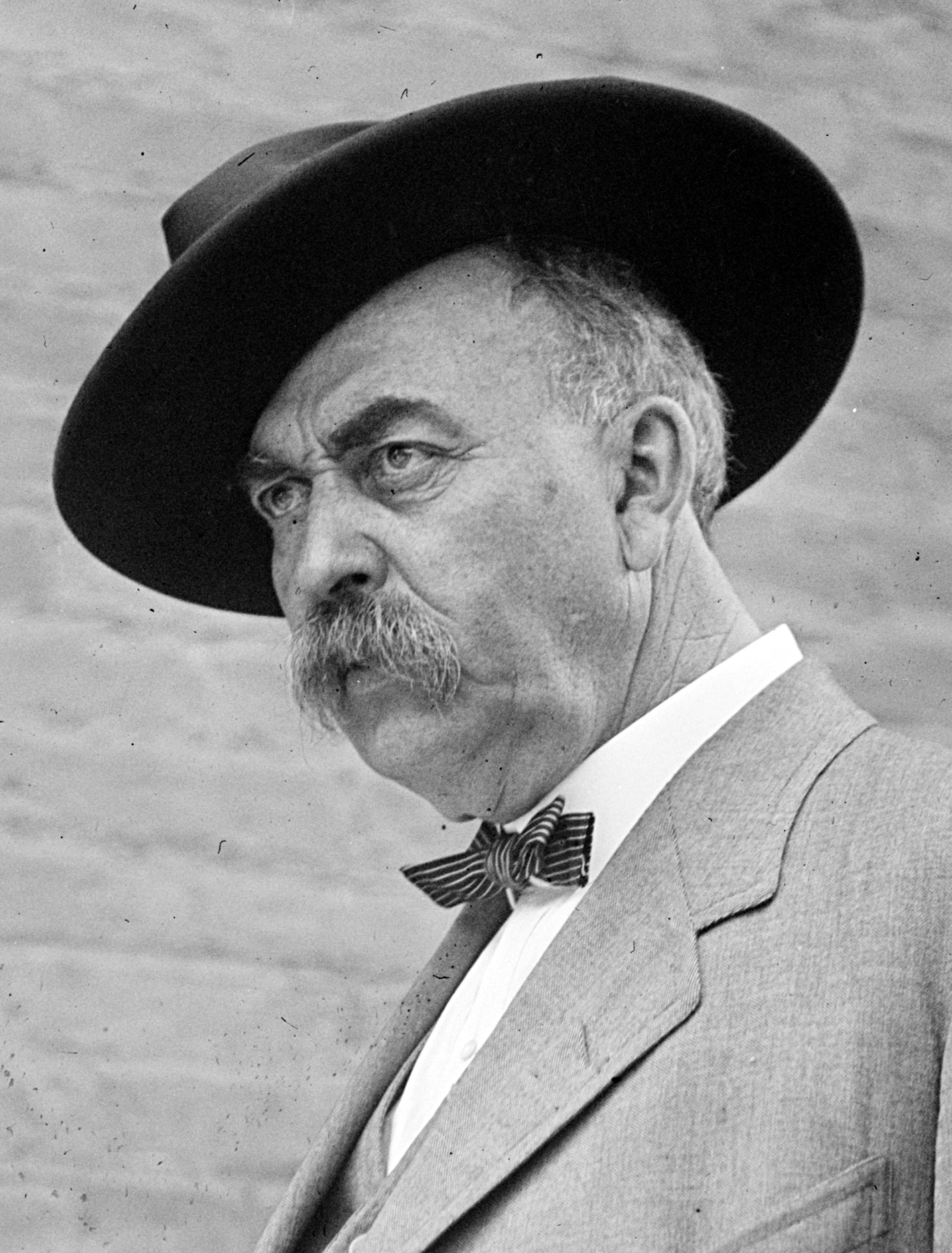
| Nominee | James H. Brady | James H. Hawley |
| Party | Republican | Democratic |
| Popular vote | 47,486 | 41,266 |
| Percentage | 43.89% | 38.14% |
| Nominee | Paul Clagstone | Calistus Cooper |
| Party | Progressive | Socialist |
| Popular vote | 10,321 | 7,888 |
| Percentage | 9.54% | 7.29% |
- County results Brady: 30–40% 40–50% 50–60% 60–70% Hawley: 40–50% 50–60%
U.S. senator before election
James H. Brady
Republican
Elected U.S. senator
James H. Brady
Republican

Idaho election
| Party | Candidate | Votes | % |
|---|---|---|---|
| Republican | James H. Brady (incumbent) | 47,486 | 43.89 |
| Democratic | James H. Hawley | 41,266 | 38.14 |
| Progressive | Paul Clagstone | 10,321 | 9.54 |
| Socialist | Calistus Cooper | 7,888 | 7.29 |
| Prohibition | W. M. Duthie | 1,237 | 1.14 |
| Majority | | 6,220 | 5.75 |
| Total votes | | 108,198 | 100.00 |
| Republican hold | | | |

== Illinois ==
1914 United States Senate election in Illinois
- November 3, 1914
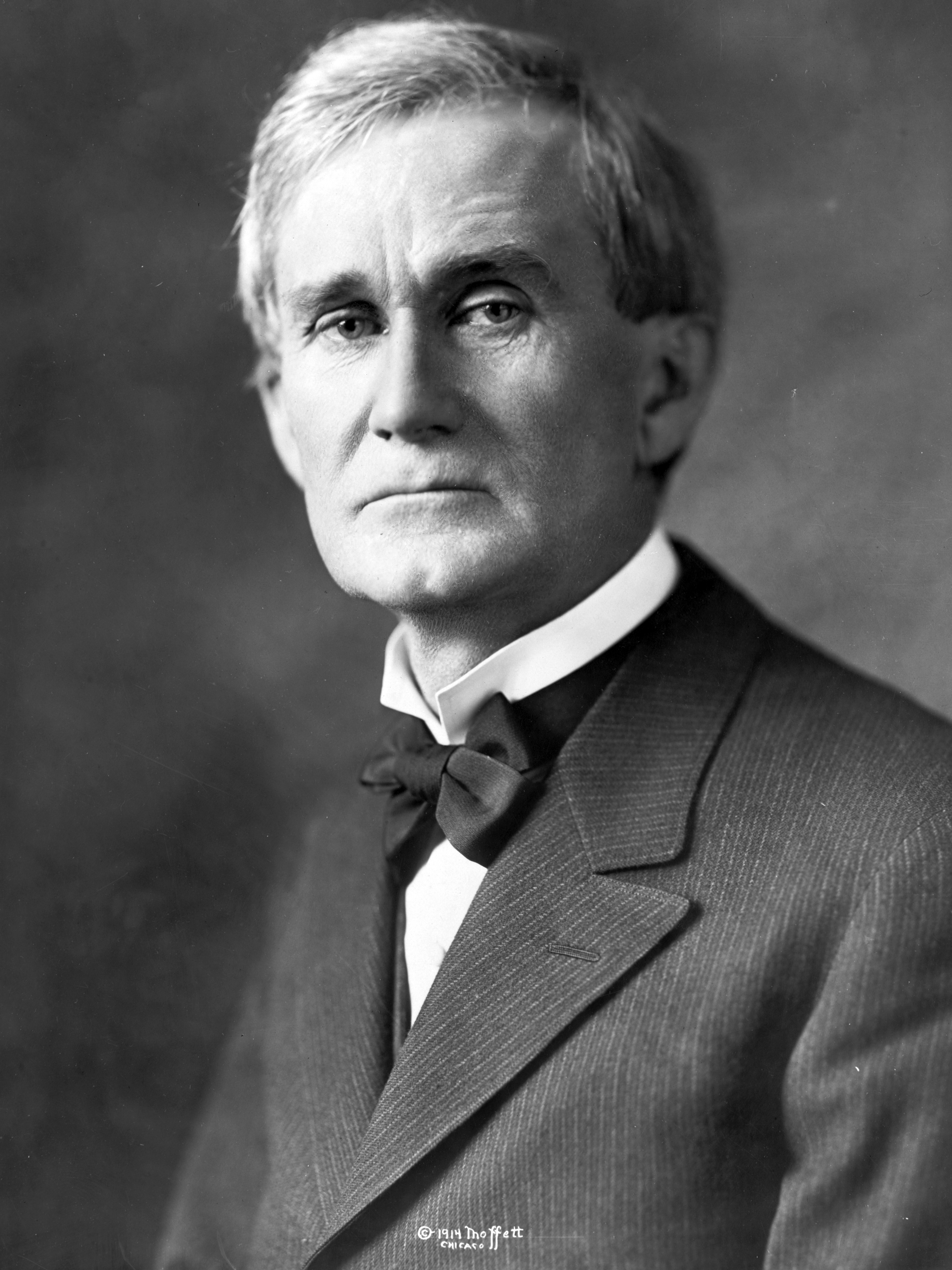

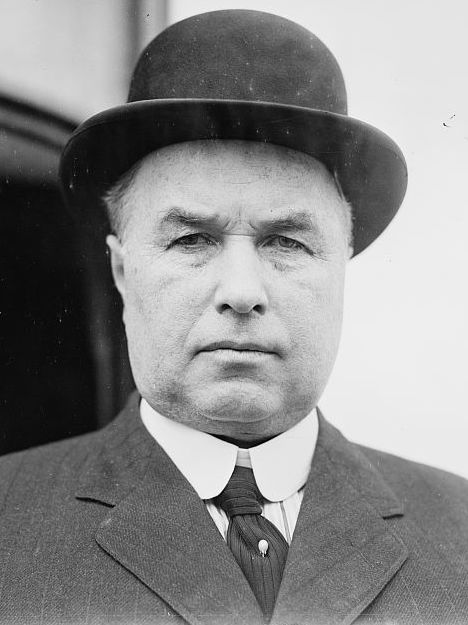

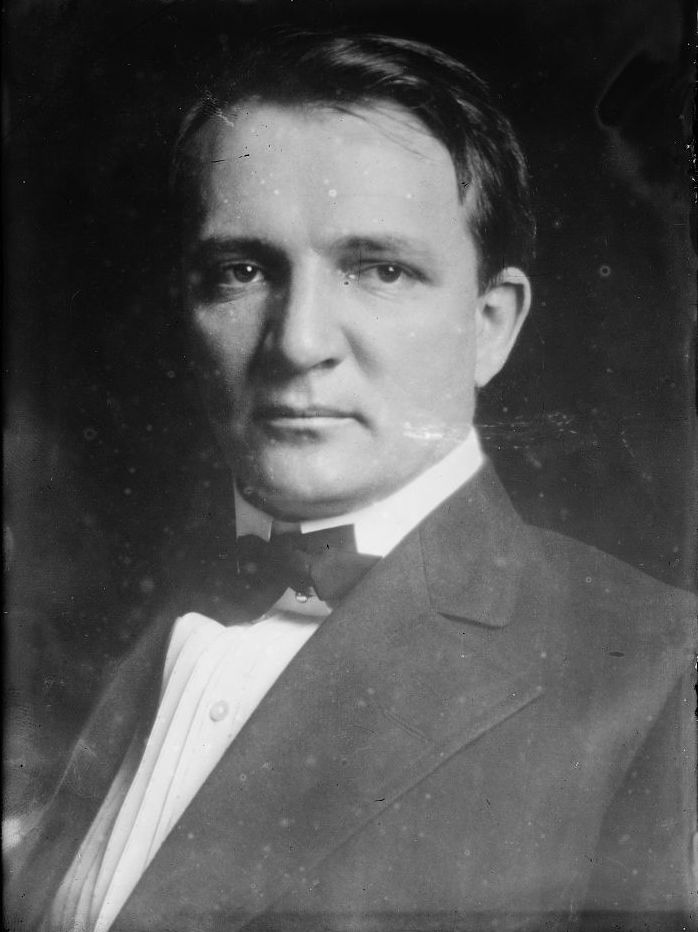
| Nominee | Lawrence Y. Sherman | Roger C. Sullivan | Raymond Robins |
| Party | Republican | Democratic | Progressive |
| Popular vote | 390,661 | 373,403 | 203,027 |
| Percentage | 38.46% | 36.76% | 19.99% |
- Results by county Sherman: 30–40% 40–50% 50–60% 60–70% Sullivan: 30–40% 40–50% 50–60% Robins: 30–40% 40–50% Tie: 40–50%
U.S. senator before election
Lawrence Y. Sherman
Republican
Elected U.S. senator
Lawrence Y. Sherman
Republican

1914 United States Senate election in Illinois
| Party | Candidate | Votes | % |
|---|---|---|---|
| Republican | Lawrence Y. Sherman (incumbent) | 390,661 | 38.46 |
| Democratic | Roger C. Sullivan | 373,403 | 36.76 |
| Progressive | Raymond Robins | 203,027 | 19.99 |
| Socialist | Adolph Germer | 39,889 | 3.93 |
| Prohibition | George W. Woolsey | 6,750 | 0.67 |
| Socialist Labor | John M. Frances | 2,078 | 0.21 |
| Majority | | 17,258 | 1.70 |
| Total votes | | 1,015,808 | 100.00 |
| Republican hold | | | |

== Indiana ==
1914 United States Senate election in Indiana
- November 3, 1914
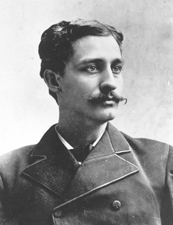

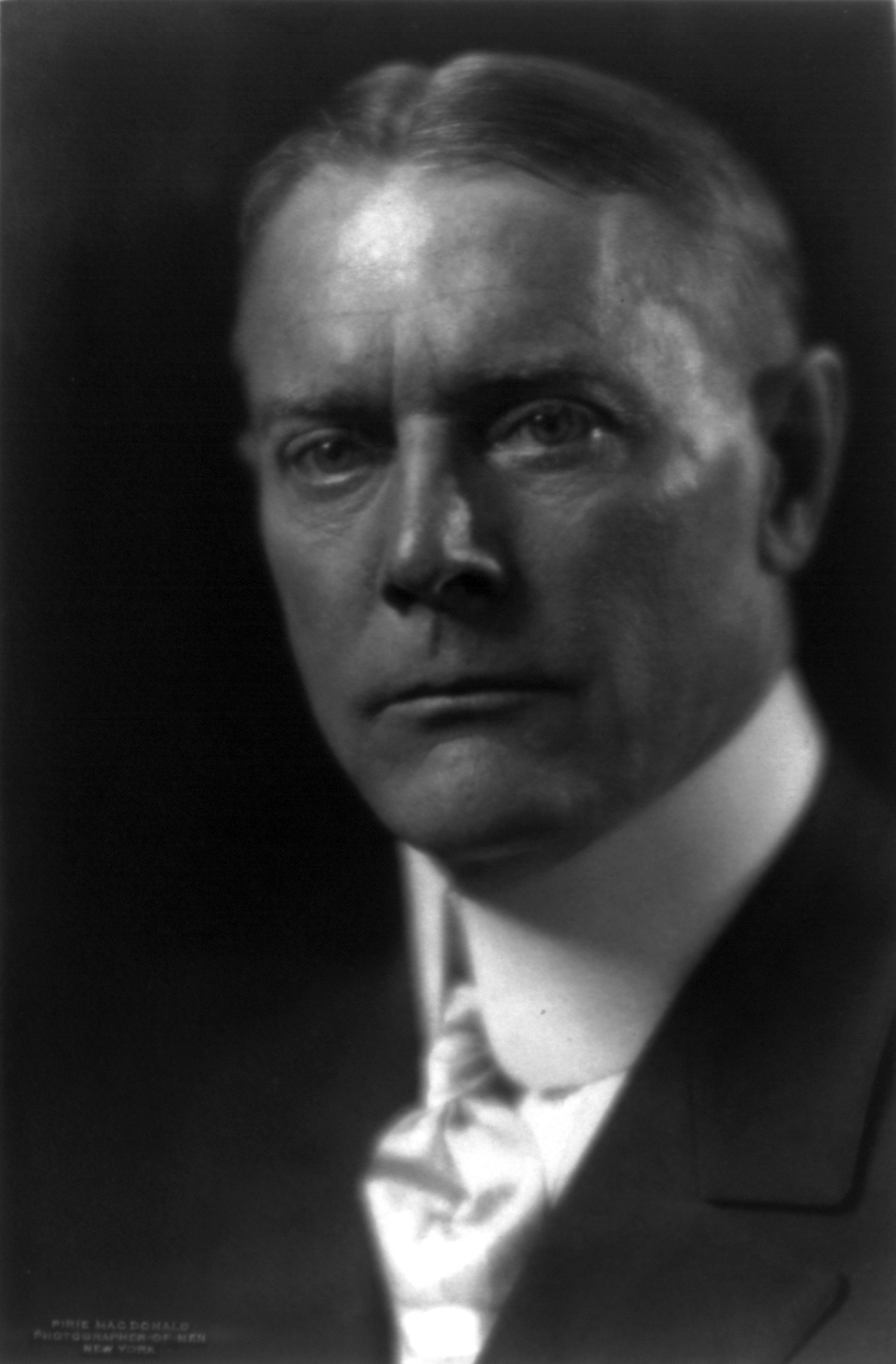
| Nominee | Benjamin F. Shively | Hugh Thomas Miller | Albert J. Beveridge |
| Party | Democratic | Republican | Progressive |
| Popular vote | 272,249 | 226,766 | 108,581 |
| Percentage | 42.14% | 35.10% | 16.81% |
- County results Shively: 30–40% 40–50% 50–60% 60–70% Miller: 30–40% 40–50% 50–60% Beveridge: 30–40%
U.S. senator before election
Benjamin F. Shively
Democratic
Elected U.S. senator
Benjamin F. Shively
Democratic

Indiana election
| Party | Candidate | Votes | % |
|---|---|---|---|
| Democratic | Benjamin F. Shively (incumbent) | 272,249 | 42.14 |
| Republican | Hugh Thomas Miller | 226,766 | 35.10 |
| Progressive | Albert J. Beveridge | 108,581 | 16.81 |
| Socialist | Stephen N. Reynolds | 21,719 | 3.36 |
| Prohibition | Sumner W. Haynes | 13,860 | 2.15 |
| Socialist Labor | James Matthews | 2,884 | 0.45 |
| Majority | | 45,483 | 7.04 |
| Total votes | | 646,059 | 100.00 |
| Democratic hold | | | |

== Iowa ==
1914 United States Senate election in Iowa
- November 3, 1914
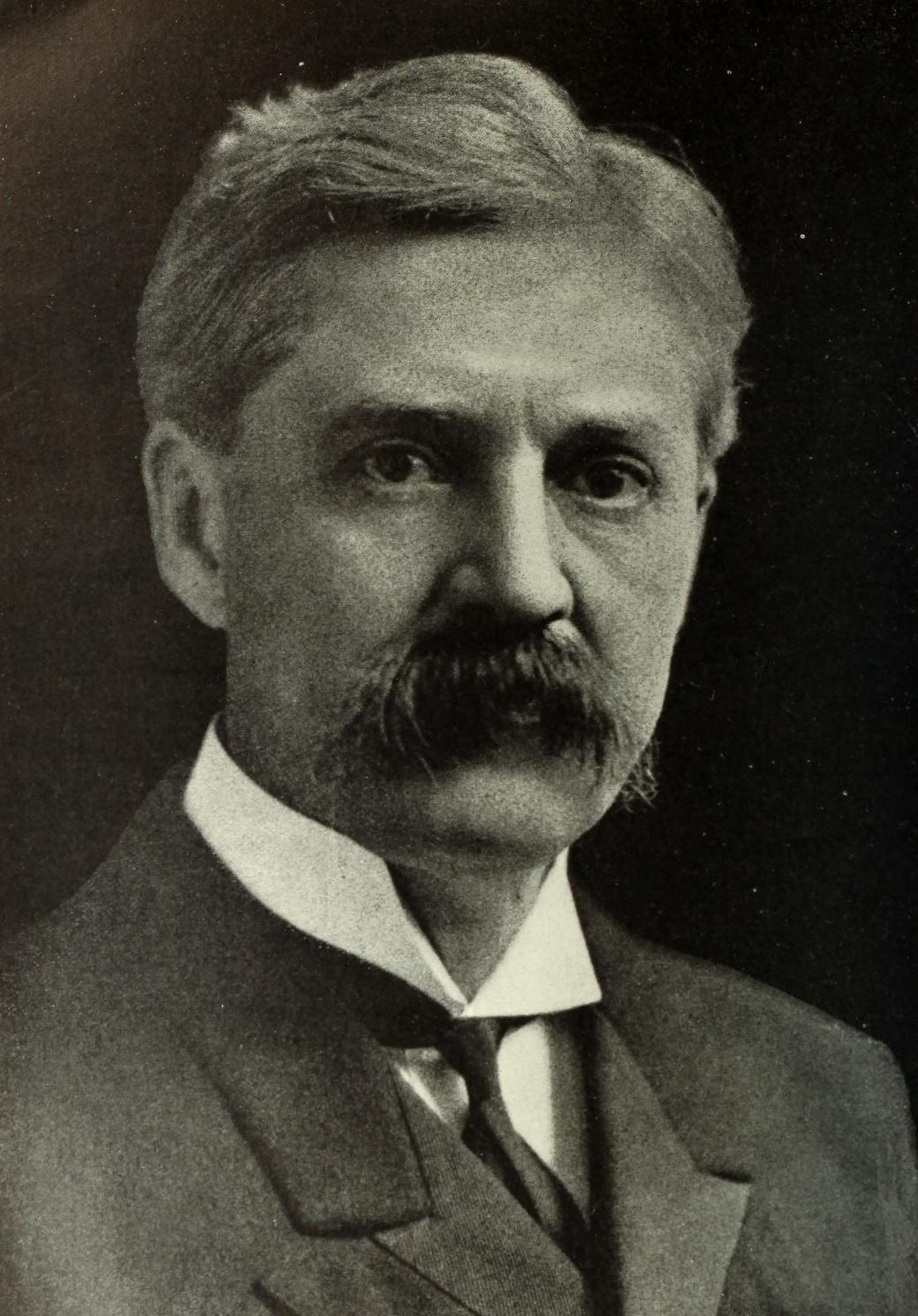

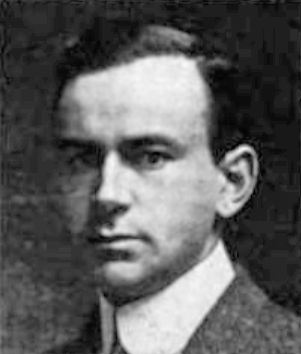

| Nominee | Albert B. Cummins | Maurice Connolly | Otis Spurgeon |
| Party | Republican | Democratic | Independent |
| Popular vote | 205,832 | 167,251 | 24,490 |
| Percentage | 48.19% | 39.16% | 5.73% |
- Results by county Cummins: 30–40% 40–50% 50–60% 60–70% 70–80% Connolly: 30–40% 40–50% 50–60% 70–80%
U.S. senator before election
Albert B. Cummins
Republican
Elected U.S. senator
Albert B. Cummins
Republican

Iowa election
| Party | Candidate | Votes | % |
|---|---|---|---|
| Republican | Albert B. Cummins (incumbent) | 205,832 | 48.19 |
| Democratic | Maurice Connolly | 167,251 | 39.16 |
| Independent | Otis Spurgeon | 24,490 | 5.73 |
| Progressive | Casper Schenk | 15,058 | 3.53 |
| Socialist | I. S. McCullis | 8,462 | 1.98 |
| Prohibition | M. L. Christian | 6,009 | 1.41 |
| Majority | | 36,581 | 9.03 |
| Total votes | | 427,102 | 100.00 |
| Republican hold | | | |

== Kansas ==
1914 United States Senate election in Kansas
- November 3, 1914
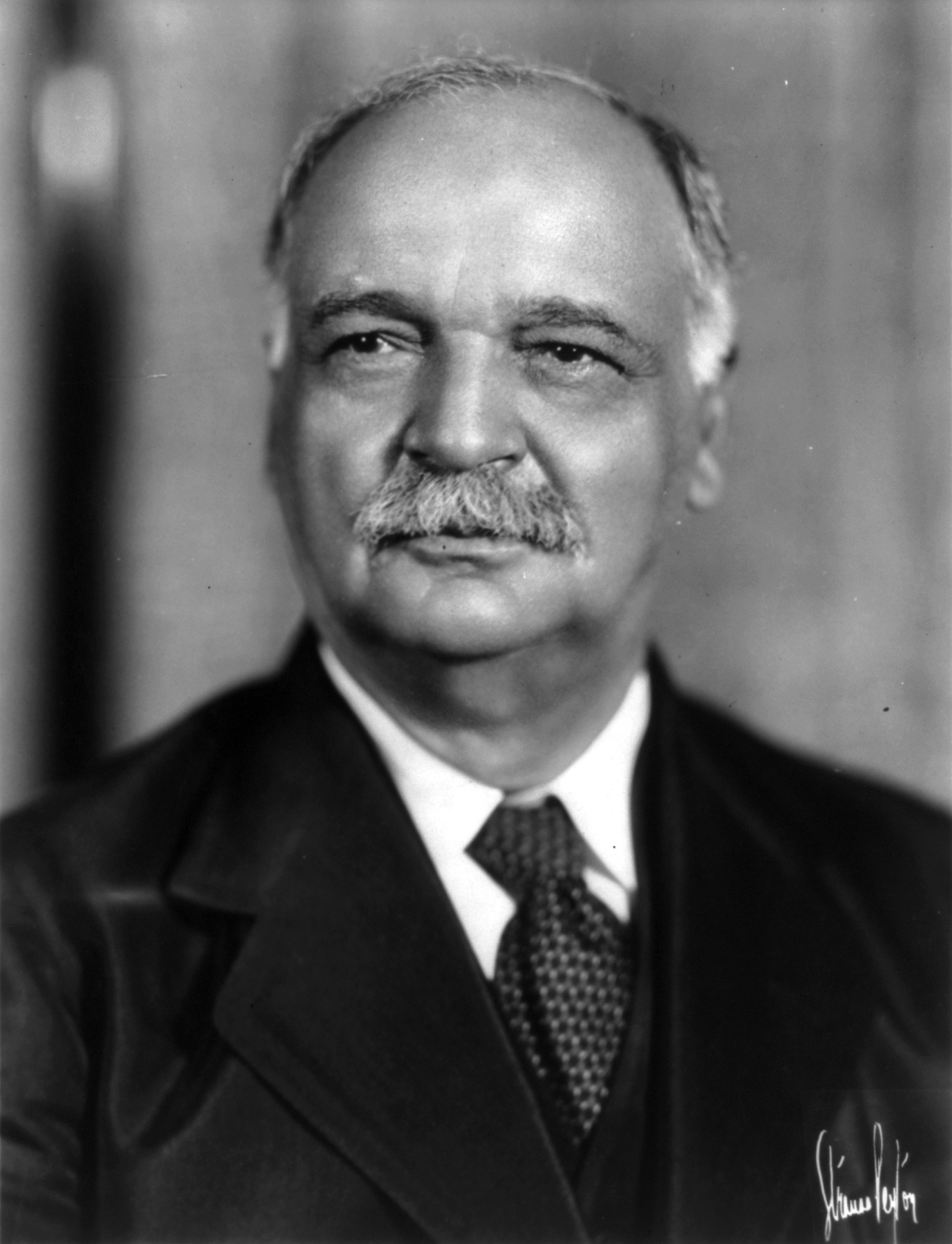

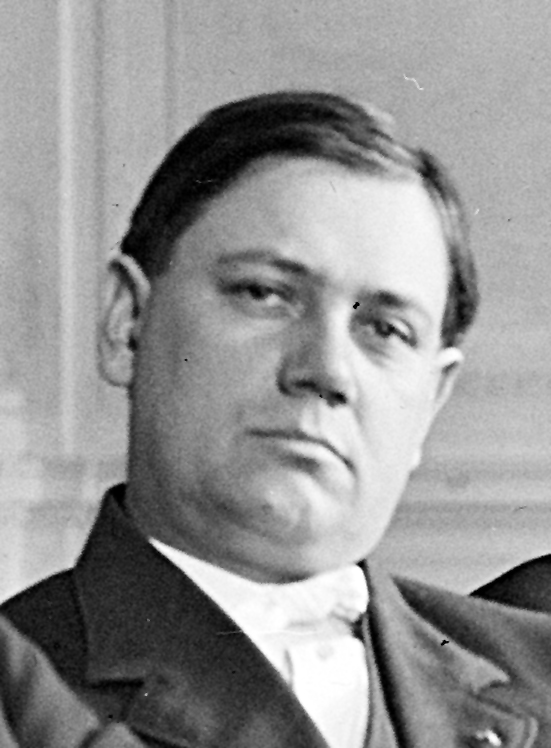

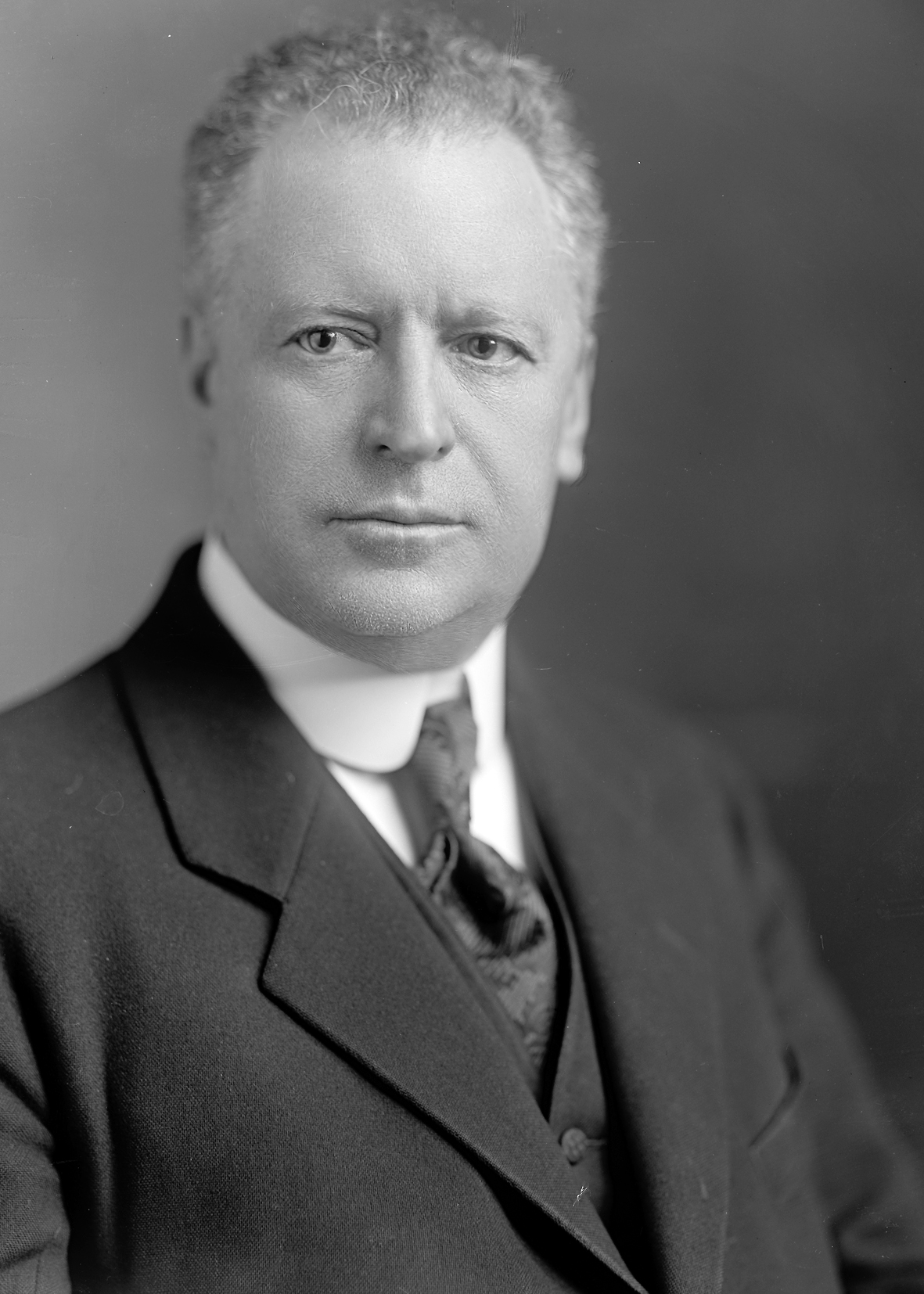
| Nominee | Charles Curtis | George A. Neeley | Victor Murdock |
| Party | Republican | Democratic | Progressive |
| Popular vote | 180,823 | 176,929 | 116,755 |
| Percentage | 35.53% | 34.77% | 22.94% |
- Results by county Curtis: 30–40% 40–50% 50–60% Neeley: 30–40% 40–50% Murdock: 40–50% 50–60%
U.S. senator before election
Joseph Little Bristow
Republican
Elected U.S. senator
Charles Curtis
Republican

Kansas election
| Party | Candidate | Votes | % |
|---|---|---|---|
| Republican | Charles Curtis | 180,823 | 35.53 |
| Democratic | George A. Neeley | 176,929 | 34.77 |
| Progressive | Victor Murdock | 116,755 | 22.94 |
| Socialist | Christian B. Hoffman | 24,502 | 4.82 |
| Prohibition | Earle R. Delay | 9,885 | 1.94 |
| Majority | | 3,894 | 0.77 |
| Total votes | | 508,894 | 100.00 |
| Republican hold | | | |

== Kentucky ==
There were two elections to the same seat due to the May 23, 1914, death of one-term Republican William O. Bradley.

=== Kentucky (special) ===
1914 United States Senate special election in Kentucky
- November 3, 1914
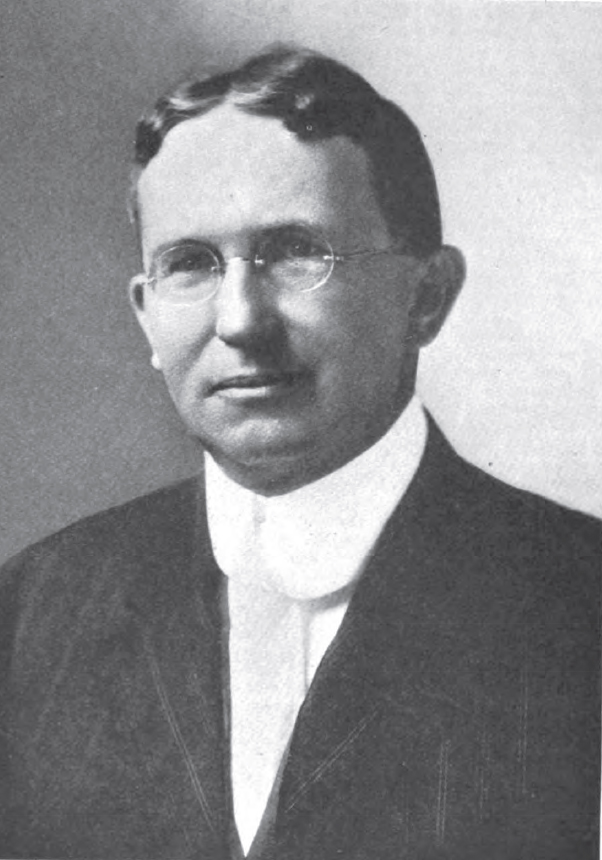

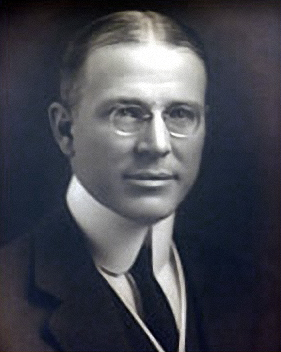
| Nominee | Johnson N. Camden Jr. | William Marshall Bullitt |
| Party | Democratic | Republican |
| Popular vote | 177,797 | 133,139 |
| Percentage | 53.99% | 40.43% |
- County results Camden: 40–50% 50–60% 60–70% 70–80% 80–90% >90% Bullitt: 40–50% 50–60% 60–70% 70–80% 80–90% >90%
U.S. senator before election
Johnson N. Camden Jr.
Democratic
Elected U.S. senator
Johnson N. Camden Jr.
Democratic

Democrat Johnson N. Camden was appointed June 16, 1914, to continue Bradley's term, pending a special election. He was challenged by U.S. Solicitor General William Marshall Bullitt.

Camden was elected in November to finish the term ending 1915.

Kentucky special election
| Party | Candidate | Votes | % |
|---|---|---|---|
| Democratic | Johnson N. Camden Jr. (incumbent) | 177,797 | 53.99 |
| Republican | William Marshall Bullitt | 133,139 | 40.43 |
| Progressive | George Nicholas | 13,641 | 4.14 |
| Socialist | Frank E. Seeds | 4,770 | 1.45 |
| Majority | | 44,658 | 13.56 |
| Total votes | | 329,347 | 100.00 |
| Democratic hold | | | |

=== Kentucky (regular) ===
1914 United States Senate election in Kentucky
- November 3, 1914
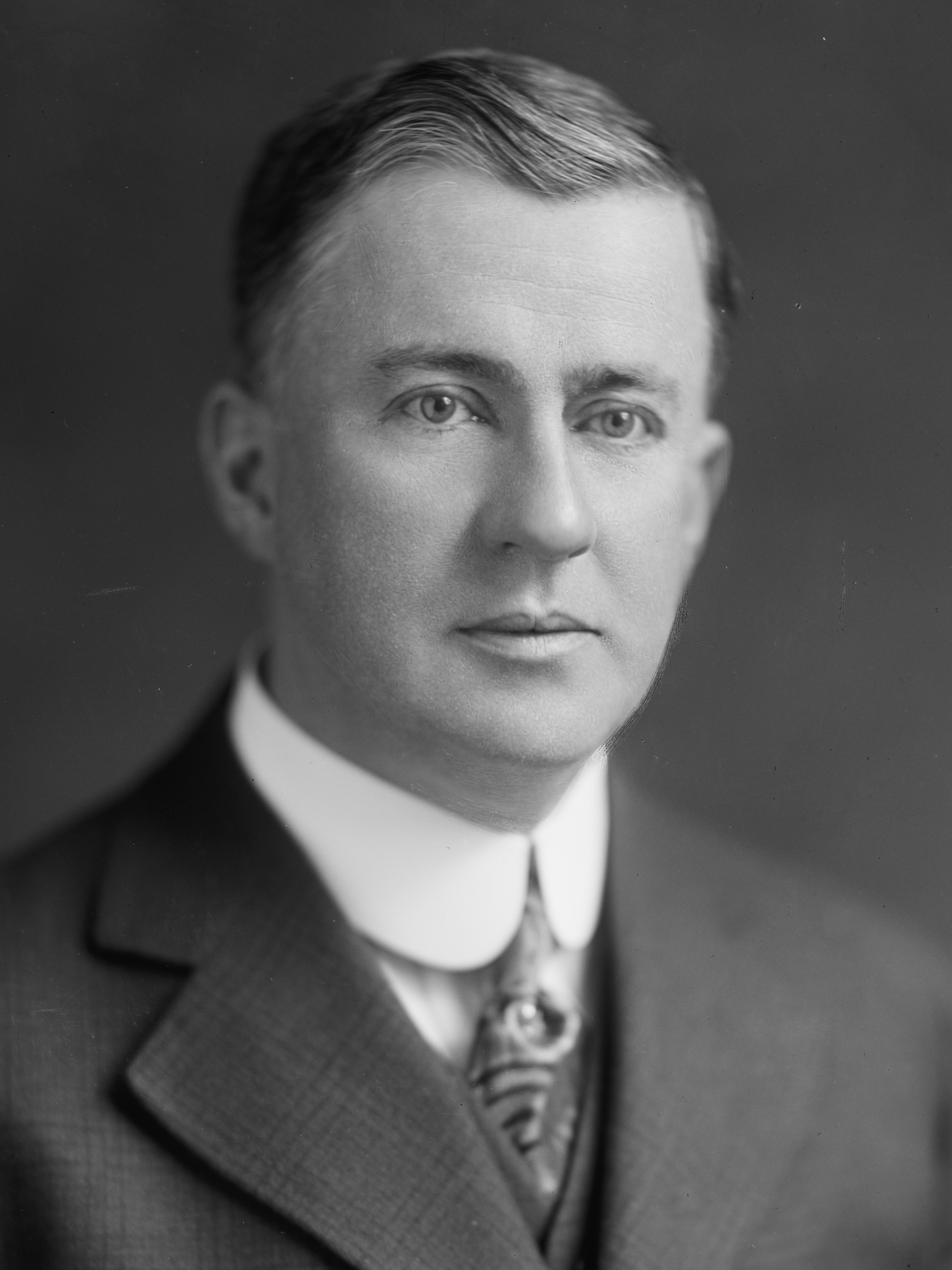

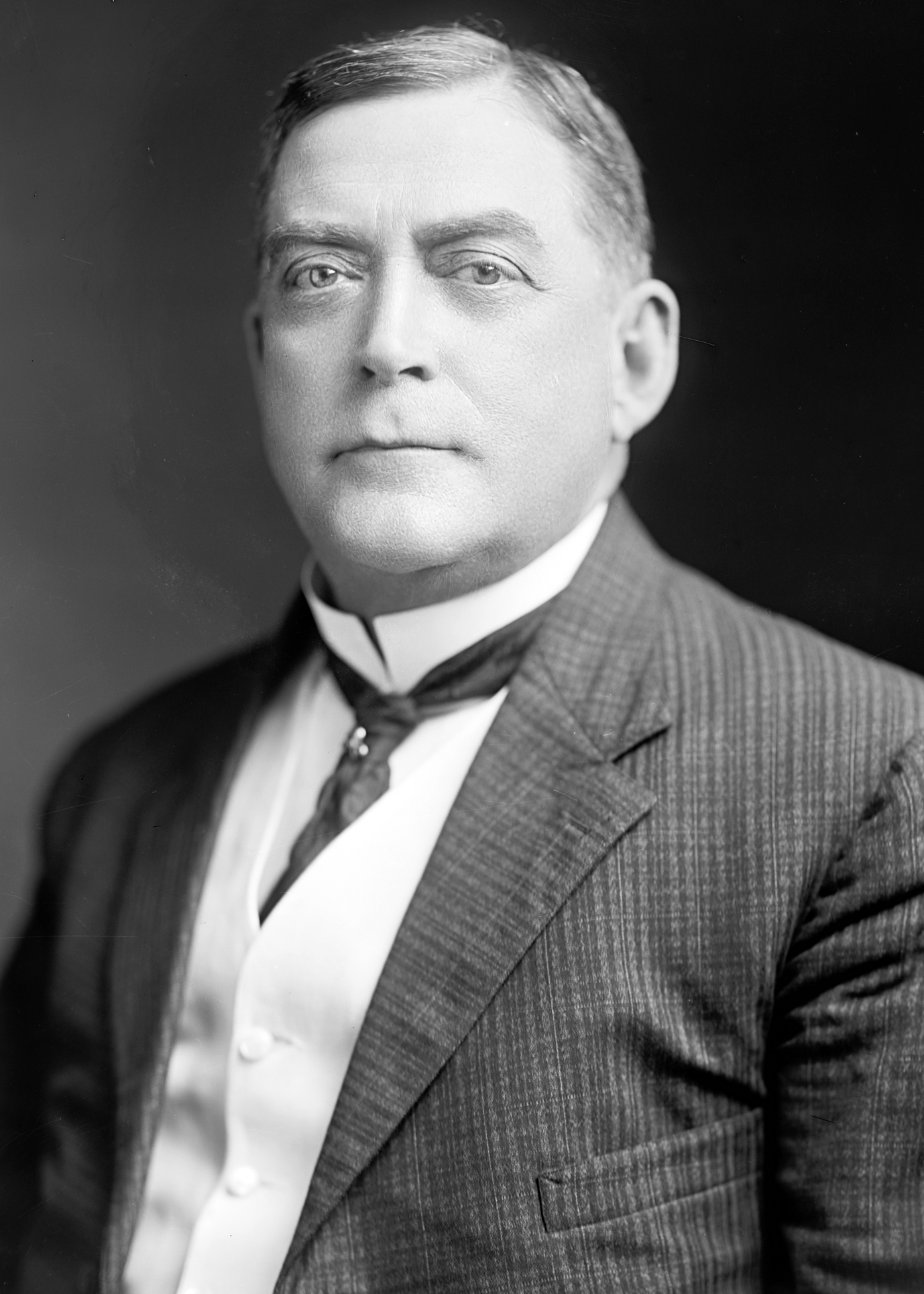
| Nominee | John C. W. Beckham | Augustus E. Willson |
| Party | Democratic | Republican |
| Popular vote | 176,605 | 144,758 |
| Percentage | 51.89% | 42.53% |
- County results Beckham: 40–50% 50–60% 60–70% 70–80% 80–90% Willson: 40–50% 50–60% 60–70% 70–80% 80–90% >90%
U.S. senator before election
Johnson N. Camden Jr.
Democratic
Elected U.S. senator
John C. W. Beckham
Democratic

Democratic appointee Johnson N. Camden was not a candidate for the next term, instead returning to agricultural activities on a farm.

In this race, two former governors of Kentucky fought for the seat. The Democratic nominee was John C. W. Beckham, who was sworn in after the assassination of William Goebel in 1900. The Republican nominee was Augustus E. Willson, who flipped the seat in 1907 after Beckham's term ended.

Beckham won the election, and would continue to serve until his re-election loss.

Kentucky election
| Party | Candidate | Votes | % |
|---|---|---|---|
| Democratic | J. C. W. Beckham | 176,605 | 51.89 |
| Republican | Augustus E. Willson | 144,758 | 42.53 |
| Progressive | Burton Vance | 14,108 | 4.15 |
| Socialist | H. J. Robertson | 4,890 | 1.44 |
| Majority | | 31,847 | 9.36 |
| Total votes | | 340,361 | 100.00 |
| Democratic hold | | | |

== Louisiana ==
1914 United States Senate election in Louisiana
- November 3, 1914
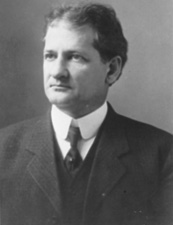
| Nominee | Robert F. Broussard |
| Party | Democratic |
U.S. senator before election
John Thornton
Democratic
Elected U.S. senator
Robert F. Broussard
Democratic

Senator Robert F. Broussard had already been elected on May 21, 1912, indirectly by the state legislature.

== Maryland ==
1914 United States Senate election in Maryland
- November 3, 1914
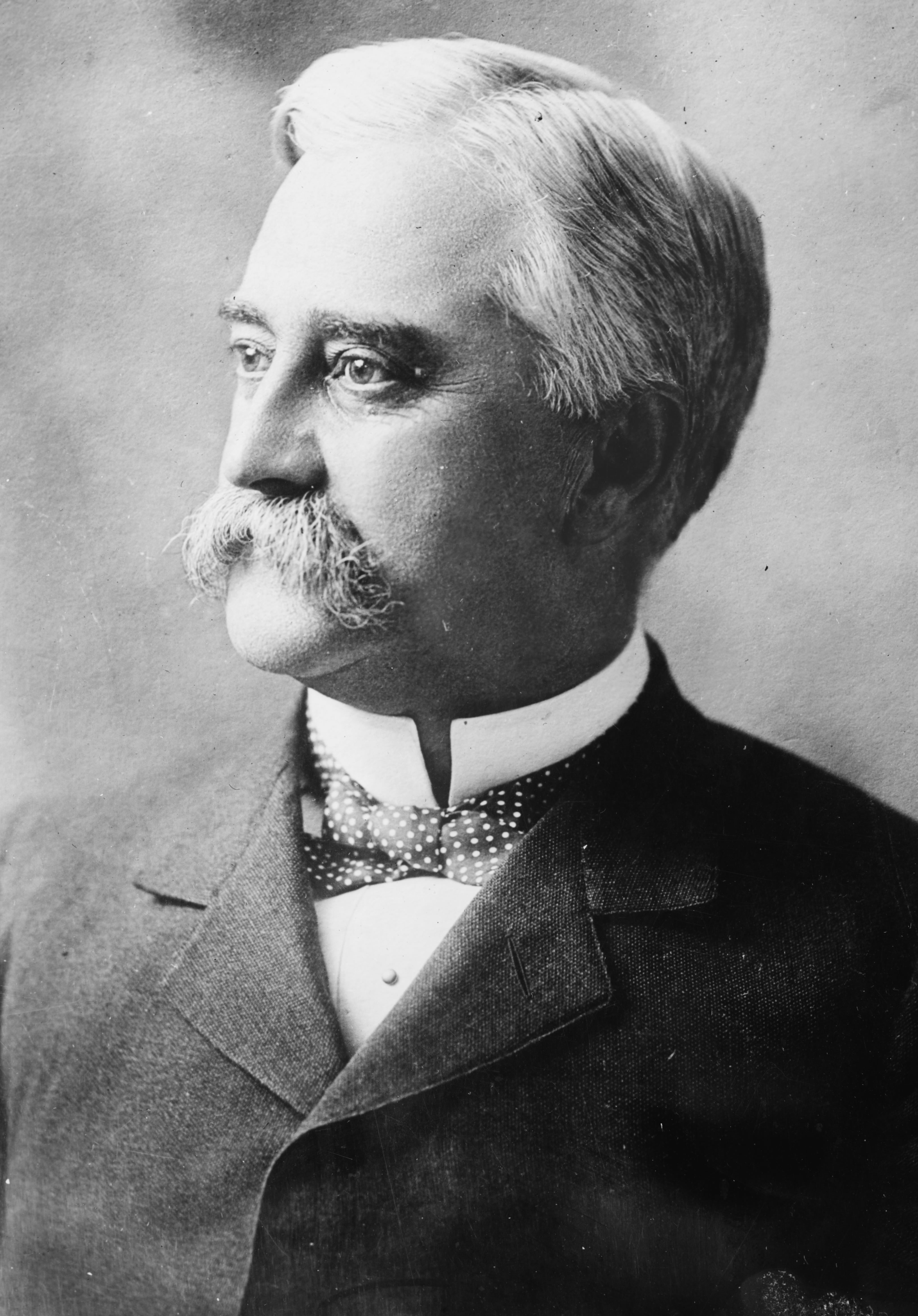

| Nominee | John Walter Smith | Edward Carrington |
| Party | Democratic | Republican |
| Popular vote | 110,204 | 94,864 |
| Percentage | 50.99% | 43.89% |
- County results Carrington: 40–50% 50–60% 60–70% Smith: 40–50% 50–60%
U.S. senator before election
John Walter Smith
Democratic
Elected U.S. senator
John Walter Smith
Democratic

Maryland elections
| Party | Candidate | Votes | % |
|---|---|---|---|
| Democratic | John Walter Smith (incumbent) | 110,204 | 50.99 |
| Republican | Edward Carrington | 94,864 | 43.89 |
| Progressive | V. Milton Reichard | 3,697 | 1.71 |
| Socialist | Charles E. Develin | 3,255 | 1.51 |
| Prohibition | Richard Henry Holme | 3,144 | 1.46 |
| Labor | Robert W. Stevens | 969 | 0.45 |
| Majority | | 15,340 | 7.10 |
| Total votes | | 216,133 | 100.00 |
| Democratic hold | | | |

== Missouri ==
1914 United States Senate election in Missouri
- November 3, 1914
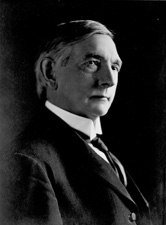

| Nominee | William J. Stone | Thomas Akins |
| Party | Democratic | Republican |
| Popular vote | 311,616 | 257,054 |
| Percentage | 50.41% | 41.58% |
- County results Stone: 40–50% 50–60% 60–70% 70–80% 80–90% Akins: 40–50% 50–60% 60–70% 70–80%
U.S. senator before election
William J. Stone
Democratic
Elected U.S. senator
William J. Stone
Democratic

Missouri election
| Party | Candidate | Votes | % |
|---|---|---|---|
| Democratic | William J. Stone (incumbent) | 311,616 | 50.41 |
| Republican | Thomas Akins | 257,054 | 41.58 |
| Progressive | Arthur N. Sager | 27,609 | 4.47 |
| Socialist | Thomas E. Greene | 17,061 | 2.76 |
| Prohibition | Orange J. Hill | 3,636 | 0.59 |
| Socialist Labor | J. W. Molineaux | 1,251 | 0.20 |
| Majority | | 54,562 | 8.83 |
| Total votes | | 618,227 | 100.00 |
| Democratic hold | | | |

== Nevada ==
1914 United States Senate election in Nevada
- November 3, 1914
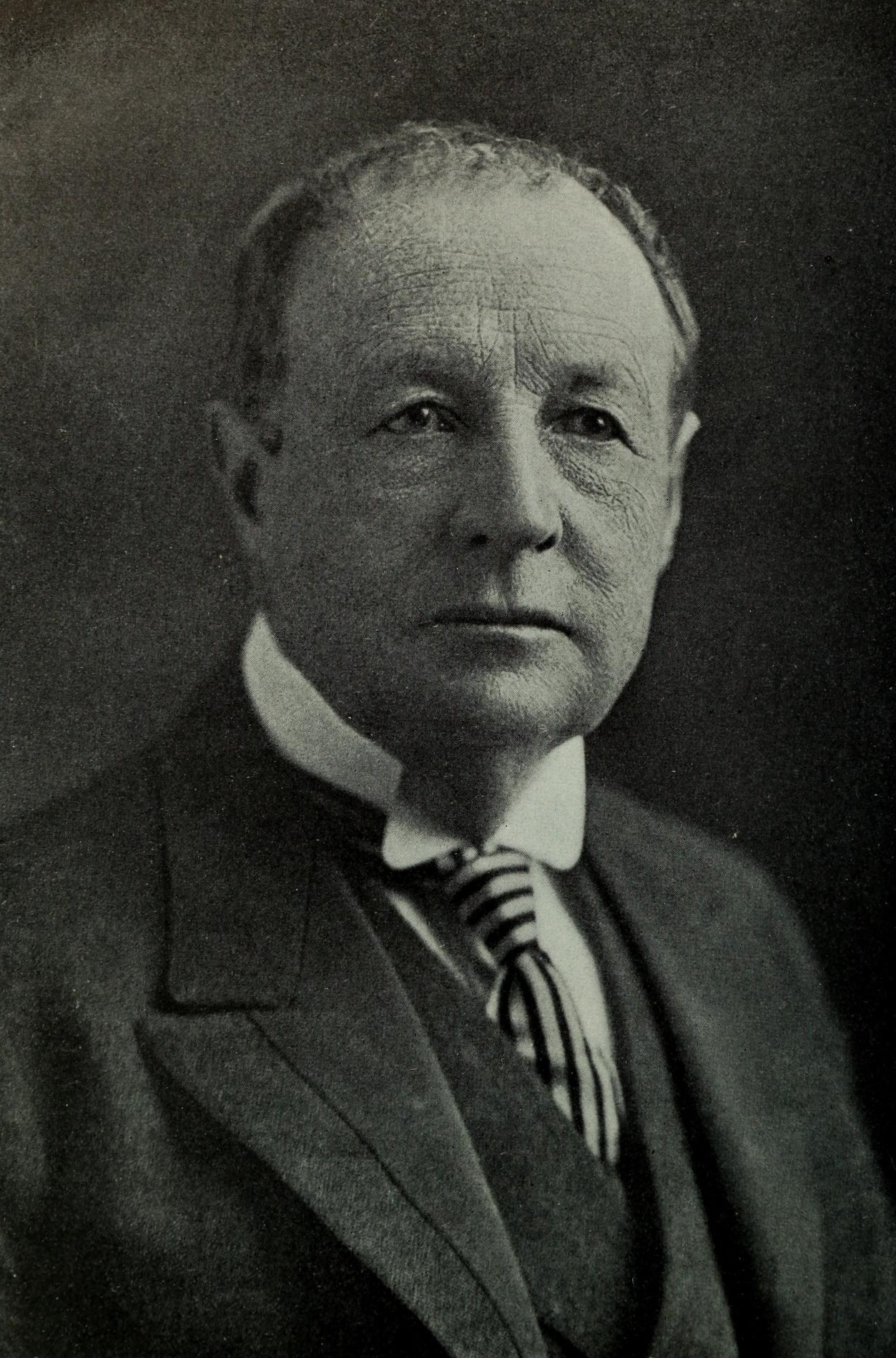

| Nominee | Francis G. Newlands | Samuel Platt | Ashley Miller |
| Party | Democratic | Republican | Socialist |
| Popular vote | 8,078 | 8,038 | 5,451 |
| Percentage | 37.46% | 37.27% | 25.28% |
- County results Newlands: 30–40% 40–50% 50–60% Platt: 30–40% 40–50% 50–60% Miller: 30–40% 40–50%
U.S. senator before election
Francis G. Newlands
Democratic
Elected U.S. senator
Francis G. Newlands
Democratic

Nevada election
| Party | Candidate | Votes | % |
|---|---|---|---|
| Democratic | Francis G. Newlands (incumbent) | 8,078 | 37.46 |
| Republican | Samuel Platt | 8,038 | 37.27 |
| Socialist | Ashley G. Miller | 5,451 | 25.28 |
| Majority | | 40 | 0.19 |
| Total votes | | 21,567 | 100.00 |
| Democratic hold | | | |

== New Hampshire ==
1914 United States Senate election in New Hampshire
- November 3, 1914
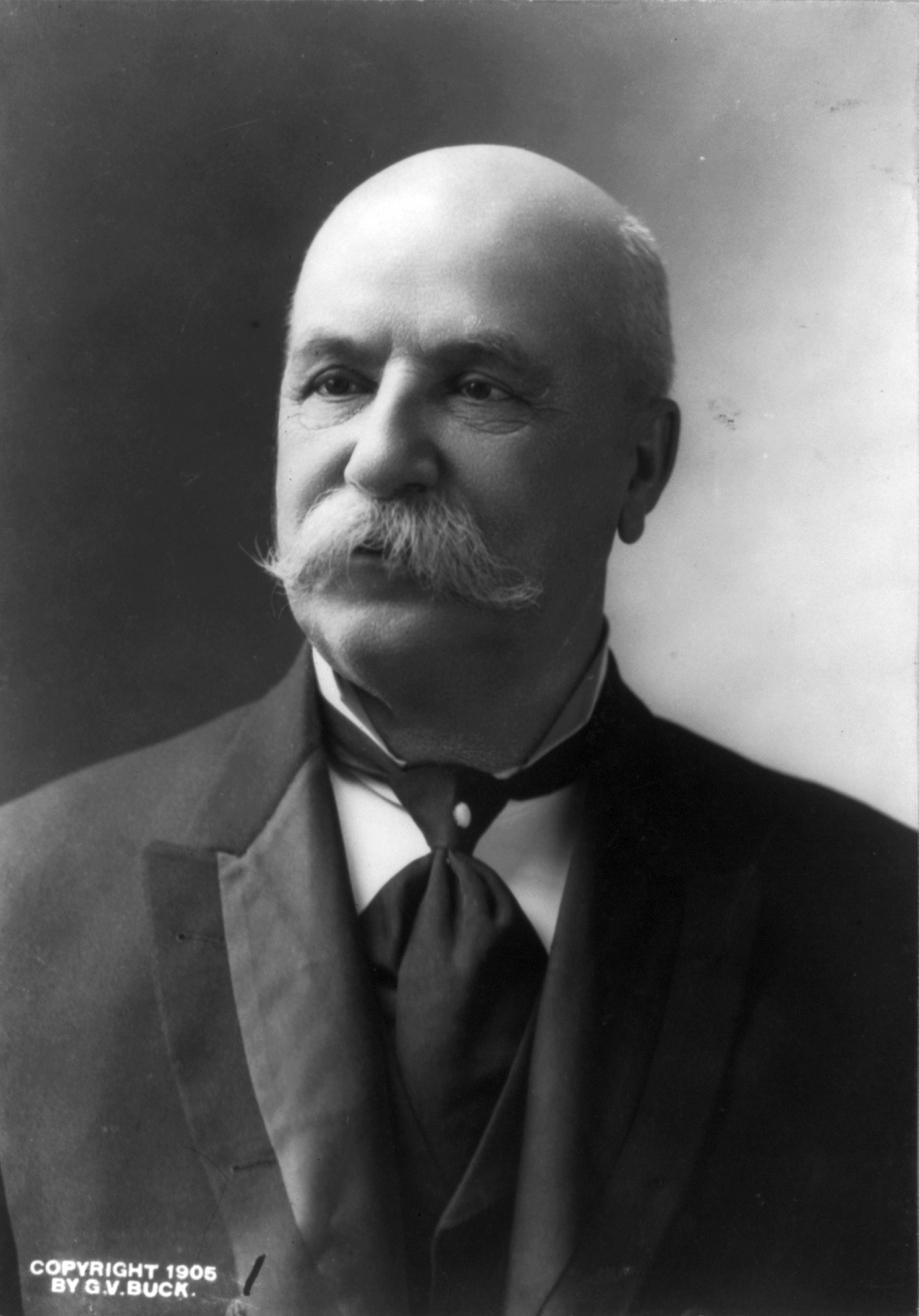

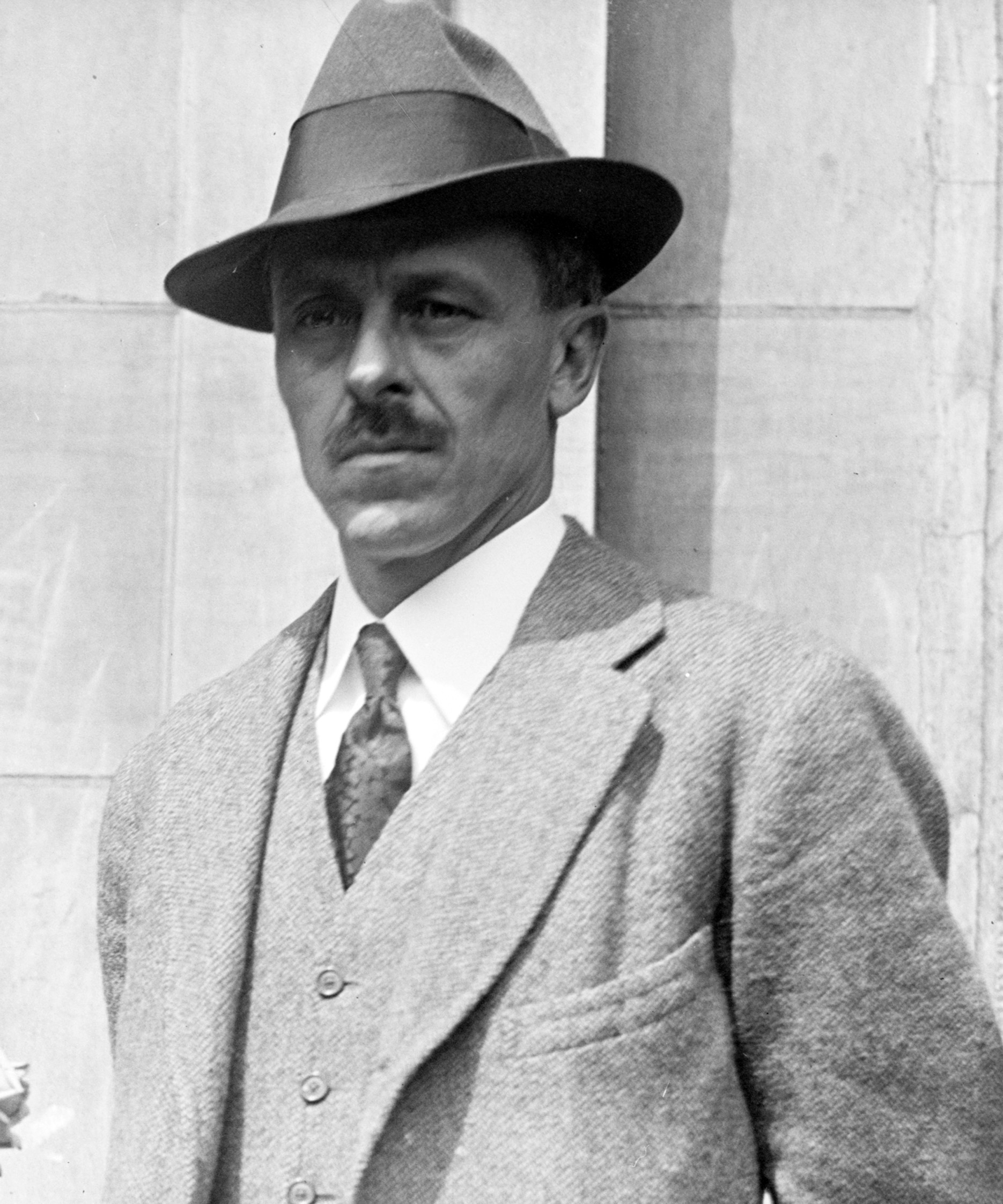
| Nominee | Jacob H. Gallinger | Raymond B. Stevens |
| Party | Republican | Democratic |
| Popular vote | 42,113 | 36,382 |
| Percentage | 51.66% | 44.63% |
- Gallinger: 40–50% 50–60% 60–70% 70–80% 80–90% 90-100% Stevens: 40–50% 50–60% 60–70% 70–80% Tie: 40–50% 50%
U.S. senator before election
Jacob H. Gallinger
Republican
Elected U.S. senator
Jacob H. Gallinger
Republican

New Hampshire election
| Party | Candidate | Votes | % |
|---|---|---|---|
| Republican | Jacob Harold Gallinger (incumbent) | 42,113 | 51.66 |
| Democratic | Raymond Bartlett Stevens | 36,382 | 44.63 |
| Prohibition | Benjamin F. Grier | 1,938 | 2.38 |
| Socialist | William H. Wilkins | 1,089 | 1.34 |
| Majority | | 5,731 | 7.03 |
| Total votes | | 81,522 | 100.00 |
| Republican hold | | | |

== New York ==
1914 United States Senate election in New York
- November 3, 1914
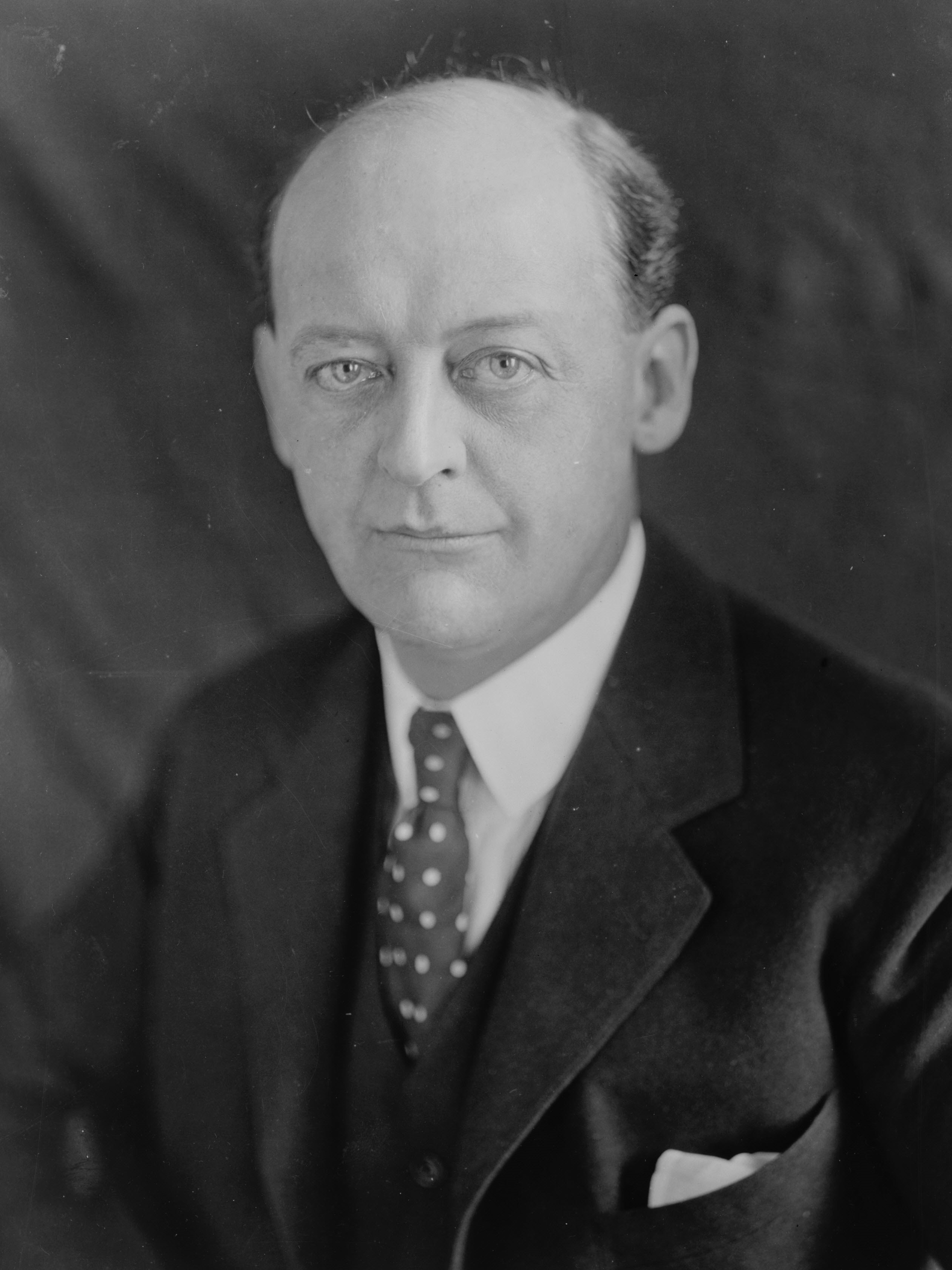

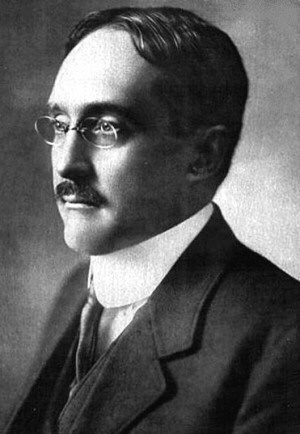
| Nominee | James W. Wadsworth | James W. Gerard |
| Party | Republican | Democratic |
| Popular vote | 639,112 | 571,419 |
| Percentage | 47.04% | 42.06 |
- County Results; Wadsworth: 40–50% 50–60% 60–70% Gerard: 40–50% 50–60% 60–70%
U.S. senator before election
Elihu Root
Republican
Elected U.S. senator
James W. Wadsworth
Republican

New York election
| Party | Candidate | Votes | % |
|---|---|---|---|
| Republican | James Wolcott Wadsworth Jr. | 639,112 | 47.04 |
| Democratic | James Watson Gerard | 571,419 | 42.06 |
| Progressive | Bainbridge Colby | 61,977 | 4.56 |
| Socialist | Charles Edward Russell | 55,266 | 4.07 |
| Prohibition | Francis E. Baldwin | 27,813 | 2.05 |
| Socialist Labor | Erwin A. Aucher | 3,064 | 0.23 |
| Majority | | 67,693 | 4.98 |
| Total votes | | 1,358,651 | 100.00 |
| Republican hold | | | |

== North Carolina ==
1914 United States Senate election in North Carolina
- November 3, 1914
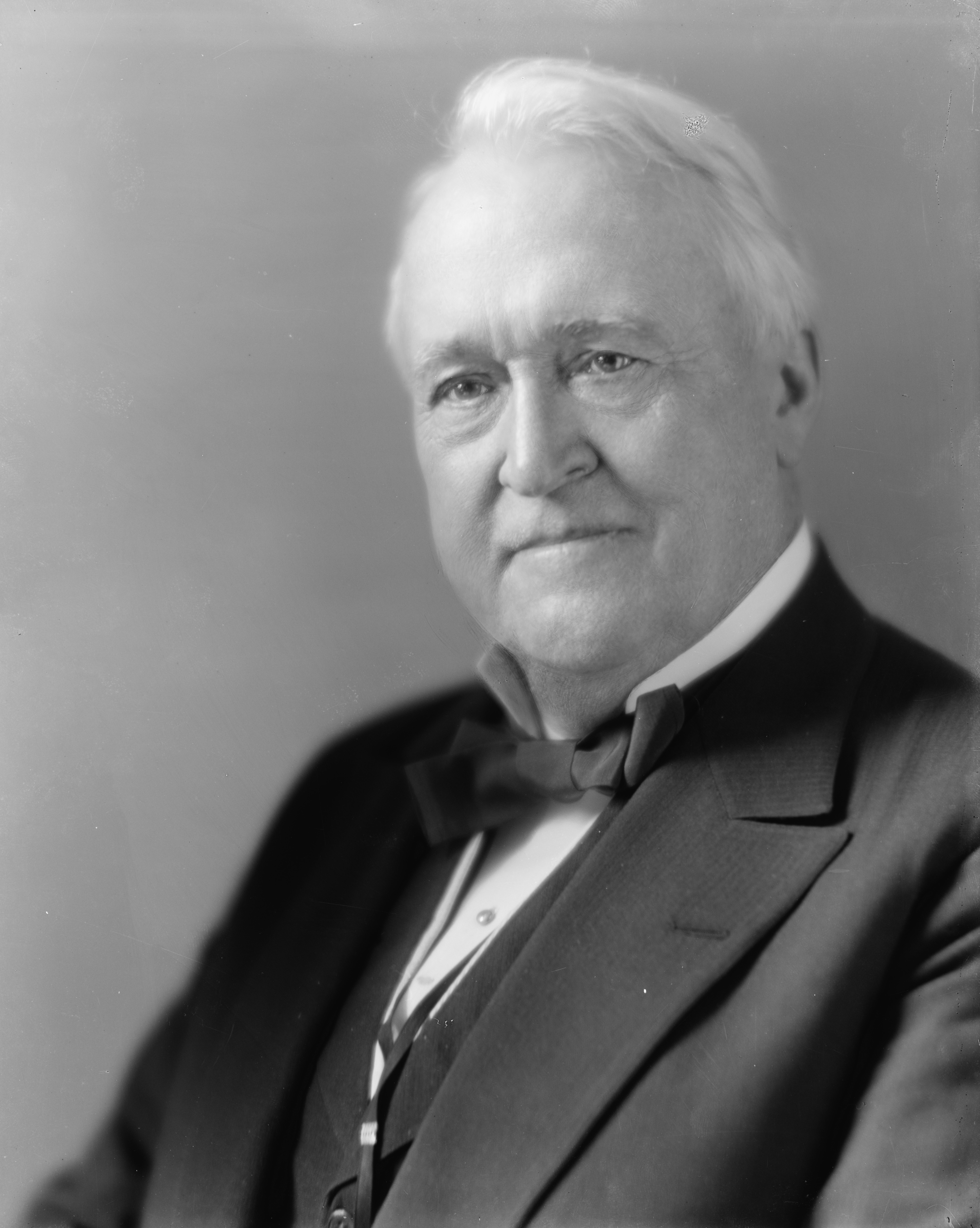

| Nominee | Lee S. Overman | A. A. Whitener |
| Party | Democratic | Republican |
| Popular vote | 121,342 | 87,101 |
| Percentage | 58.10% | 41.70% |
- County Results; Overman: 50–60% 60–70% 70–80% 80–90% >90% Whitener: 50–60% 60–70% 70–80%
U.S. senator before election
Lee S. Overman
Democratic
Elected U.S. senator
Lee S. Overman
Democratic

North Carolina election
| Party | Candidate | Votes | % |
|---|---|---|---|
| Democratic | Lee S. Overman (incumbent) | 121,342 | 58.10 |
| Republican | Adolphus A. Whitener | 87,101 | 41.70 |
| Socialist | Henry J. Oliver | 425 | 0.20 |
| Majority | | 34,241 | 16.39 |
| Total votes | | 208,868 | 100.00 |
| Democratic hold | | | |

== North Dakota ==
1914 United States Senate election in North Dakota
- November 3, 1914
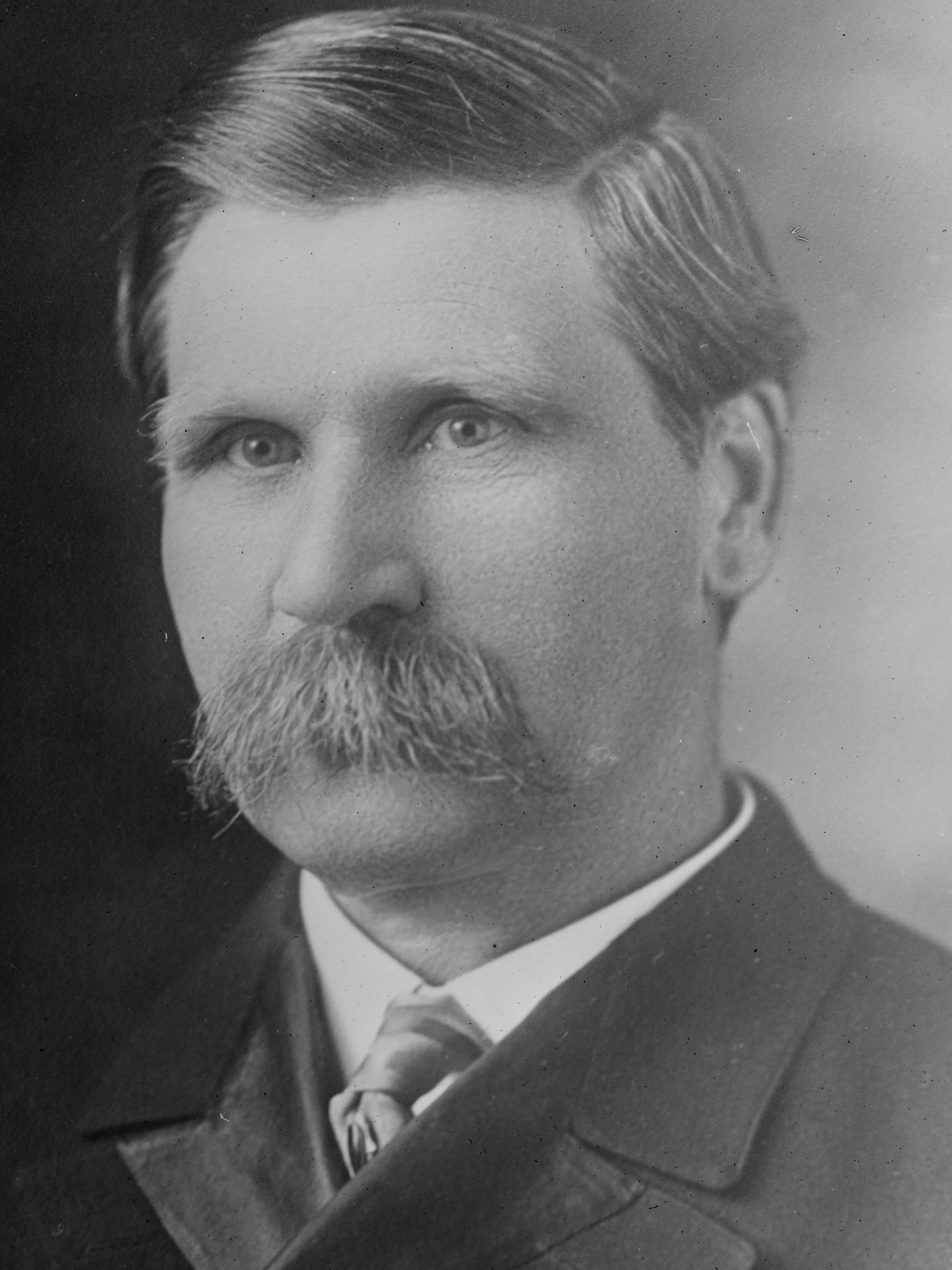

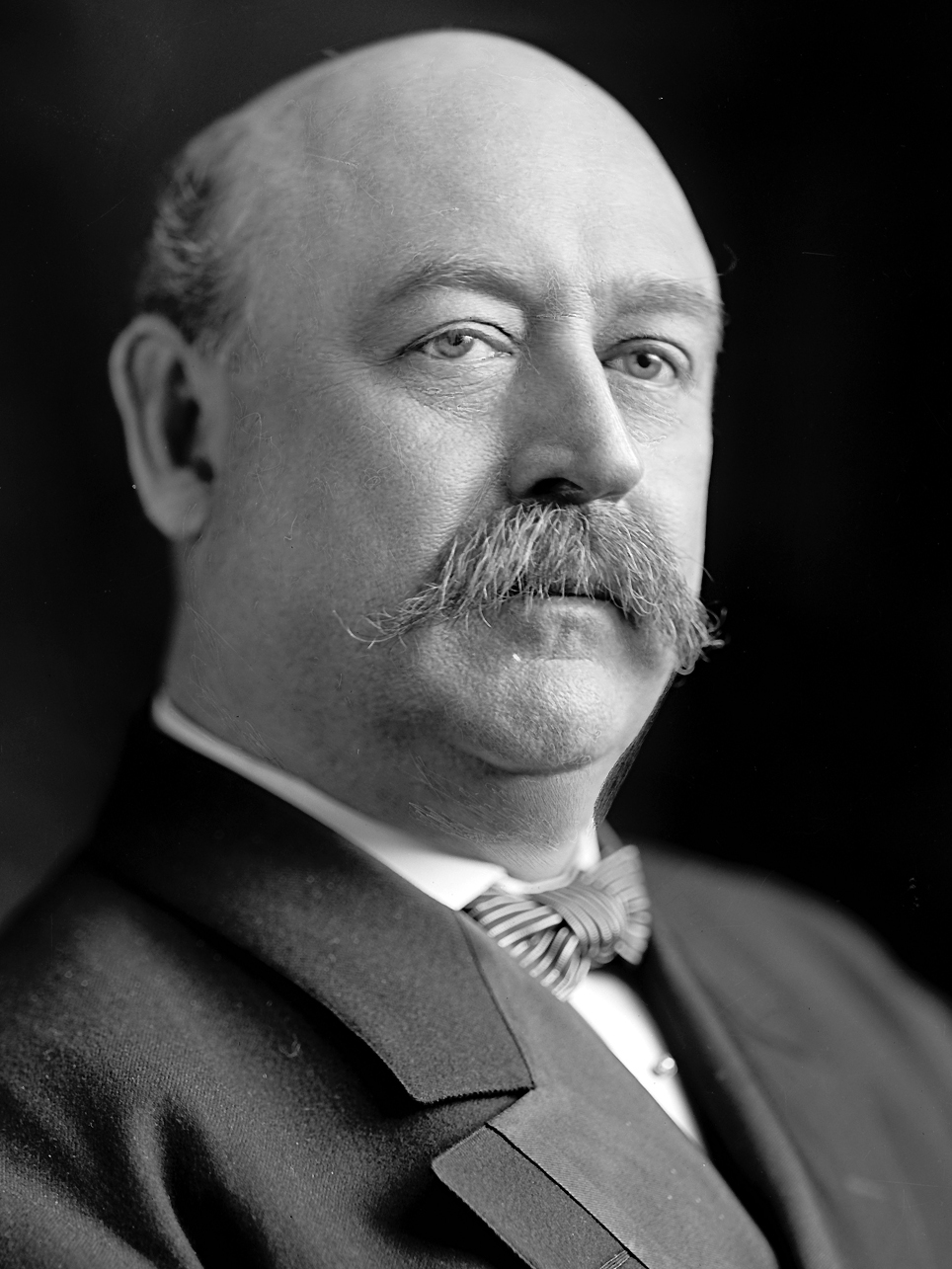

| Nominee | Asle Gronna | William E. Purcell | W. H. Brown |
| Party | Republican | Democratic | Socialist |
| Popular vote | 48,732 | 29,640 | 6,231 |
| Percentage | 55.82% | 33.95 | 7.14 |
- County results Gronna: 40–50% 50–60% 60–70% 70–80% Purcell: 50–60% No Vote
U.S. senator before election
Asle Gronna
Republican
Elected U.S. senator
Asle Gronna
Republican

North Dakota election
| Party | Candidate | Votes | % |
|---|---|---|---|
| Republican | Asle Gronna (incumbent) | 48,732 | 55.82 |
| Democratic | William E. Purcell | 29,640 | 33.95 |
| Socialist | W. H. Brown | 6,231 | 7.14 |
| Independent | Sever Serumgard | 2,707 | 3.10 |
| Majority | | 19,092 | 21.87 |
| Total votes | | 87,310 | 100.00 |
| Republican hold | | | |

== Ohio ==
1914 United States Senate election in Ohio
- November 3, 1914

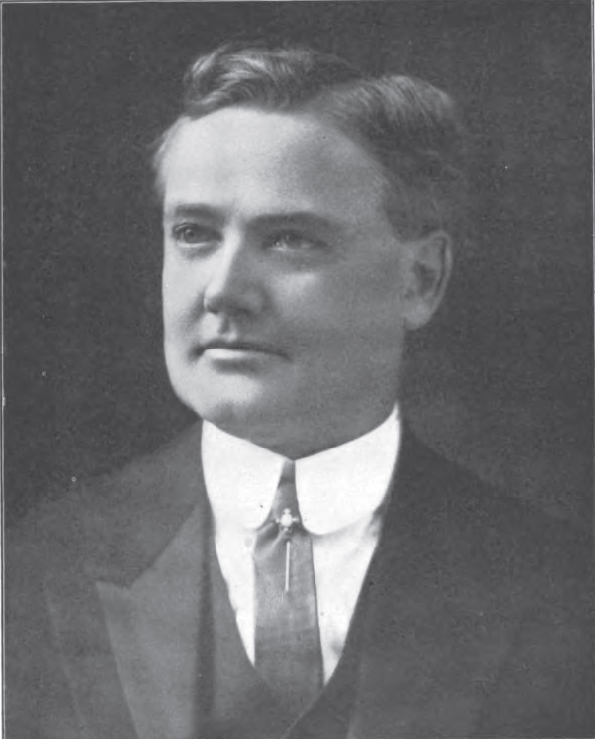

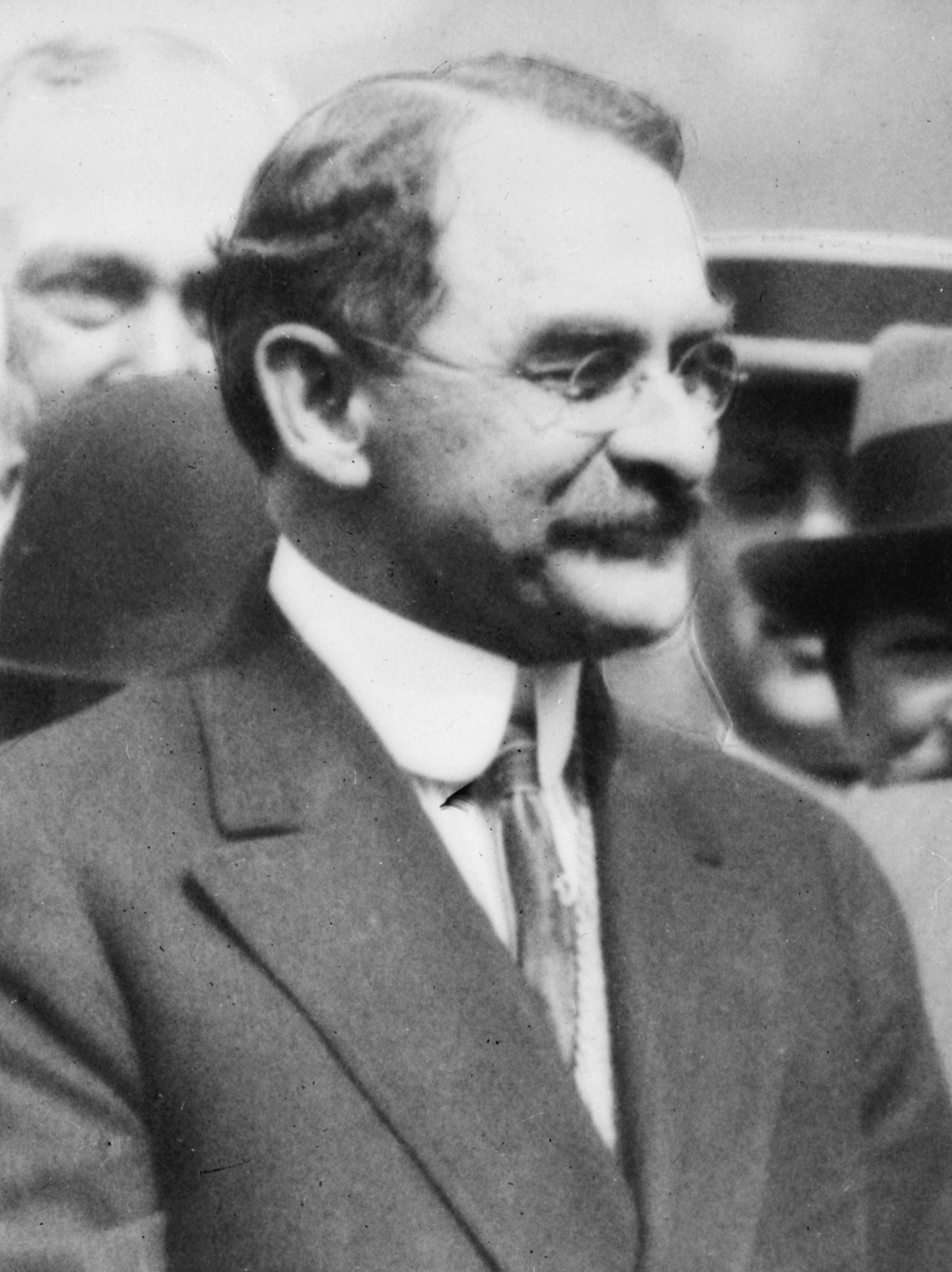
| Nominee | Warren G. Harding | Timothy S. Hogan | Arthur L. Garford |
| Party | Republican | Democratic | Progressive |
| Popular vote | 526,115 | 423,742 | 67,509 |
| Percentage | 49.16% | 39.60% | 6.31% |
- County results Harding: 40–50% 50–60% 60–70% Hogan: 40–50% 50–60%
U.S. senator before election
Theodore E. Burton
Republican
Elected U.S. senator
Warren G. Harding
Republican

Republican nominee Warren G. Harding, future President of the United States, defeated Democratic nominee Timothy S. Hogan to succeed retiring incumbent Republican Senator Theodore E. Burton.

Initially, Harding was not interested in running for U.S. Senate, due to the divisive remnants of the 1912 elections between the conservative and progressive factions of the Republican party. Harry Daugherty, an Ohio political boss, was interested in running for the seat himself upon learning of incumbent Senator Theodore Burton's plans to retire upon the expiration of his term, but party leaders advised him not to run. Instead, Daugherty unsuccessfully attempted to stage a draft movement to convince Harding to run for the seat. After the death of Amos Kling, the father of Harding's wife Florence, she encouraged her husband to run. The precise reasoning for this is unknown, but some in Marion, the Hardings' home town, believe that Harding had agreed not to seek higher office as part of a reuniting "truce" between Florence and her father, or that Kling had convinced Harding that it would behoove him to further his business rather than run for public office.

Although Daugherty claimed it was him who had convinced Harding to run for the Senate, Harding's friend and attorney Hoke Donithen, who eventually became Harding's campaign manager, may have played a role in his decision to run. Retiring Senator Theodore Burton also claimed credit, saying to his biographer that Daugherty did not agree to throw his support behind Harding until after learning he had backed him.

The Republican primary was a three-way contest between Harding, former U.S. Senator and ex-mentor Joseph B. Foraker and Ralph Cole. Rather than antagonizing his opponents, Harding notably tried to keep and make friends within the Republican party, to the frustration of those running against him. Ralph Cole, in his frustration, said, "If he is not going to fight someone, why did he enter the contest?" Harding eventually defeated both of his opponents in the primary, garnering 88,540 votes. Foraker finished in second with 76,817 votes, ahead of Cole with 52,237.

In the general election campaign, Harding faced Democratic nominee Timothy Hogan and Progressive candidate Arthur Garford. Hogan was subject to anti-Catholic sentiment among voters, which Harding himself did not exhibit during the course of the election. Harding's supporters accused Hogan of wanting to "deliver Ohio to the Pope." Harding downplayed the issue of World War I, despite the fact that the election took place just after the outbreak of the war, due to the high German immigrant population. Harding ultimately won the election and subsequently became the first United States Senator from Ohio to be popularly elected, following the passage of the 17th Amendment to the Constitution.

Harding's victory in his bid for the Senate seat raised speculation that he would seek higher office, specifically the Presidency, although Harding himself did not show any interest in doing so at the time. He told family and friends after being elected to the Senate that he would return to his previous career in newspaper publishing at The Marion Daily Star after serving in the Senate.

Ohio election
| Party | Candidate | Votes | % |
|---|---|---|---|
| Republican | Warren G. Harding | 526,115 | 49.16 |
| Democratic | Timothy S. Hogan | 423,742 | 39.60 |
| Progressive | Arthur Lovett Garford | 67,509 | 6.31 |
| Socialist | F. K. Hitchens | 52,803 | 4.93 |
| Majority | | 102,373 | 9.57 |
| Total votes | | 1,070,169 | 100.00 |
| Republican hold | | | |

== Oklahoma ==
1914 United States Senate election in Oklahoma
- November 3, 1914
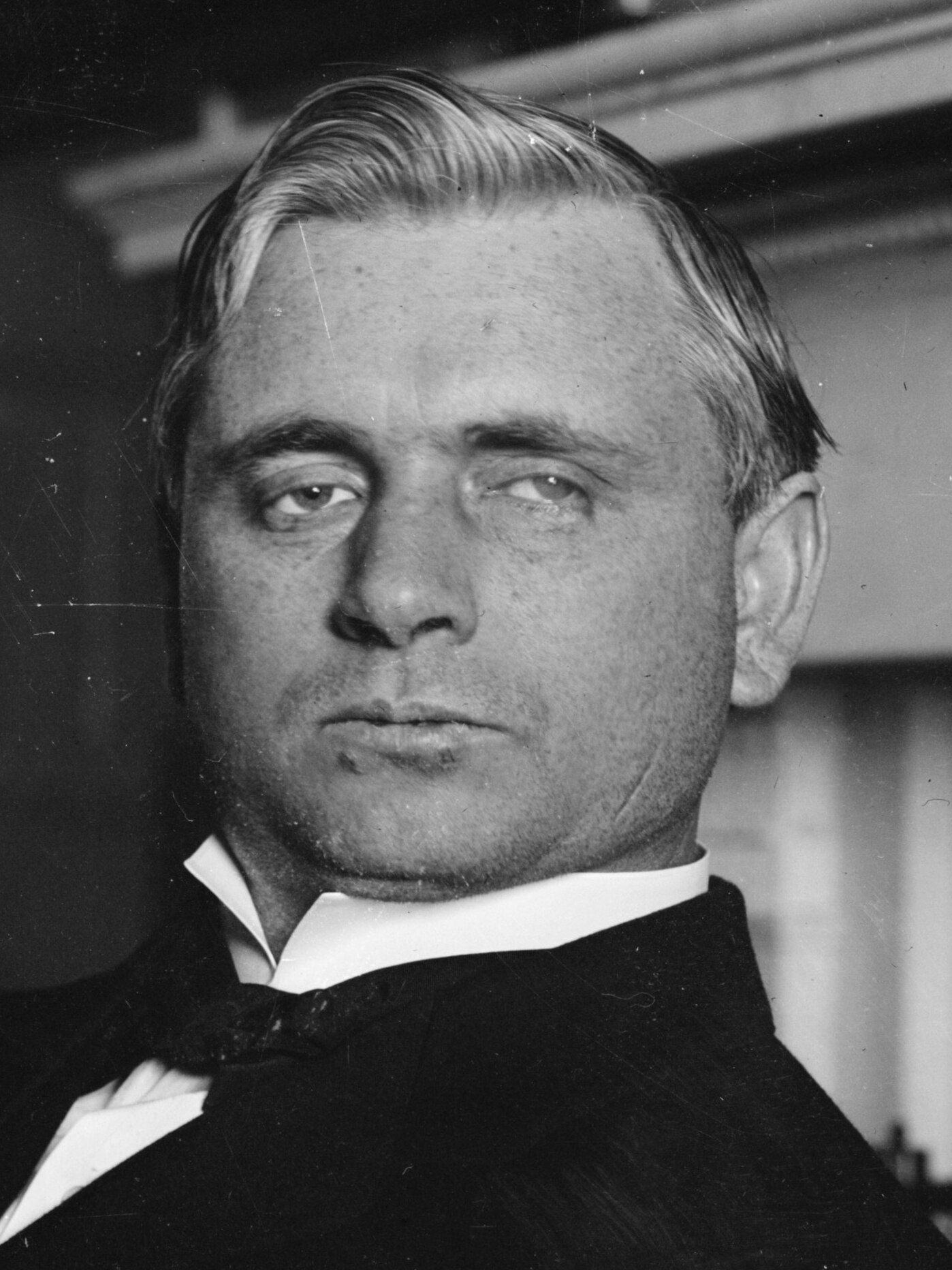

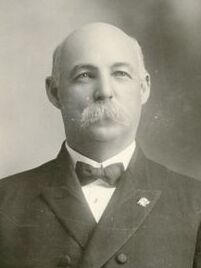

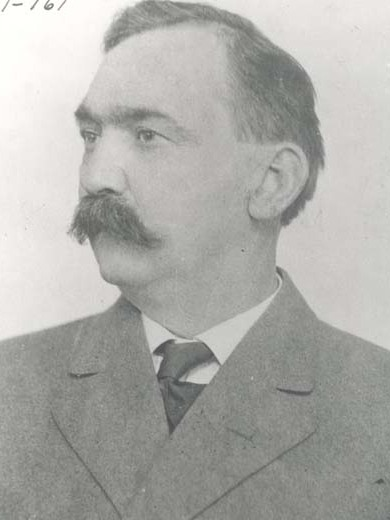
| Nominee | Thomas Gore | John H. Burford | Patrick S. Nagle |
| Party | Democratic | Republican | Socialist |
| Popular vote | 119,443 | 73,292 | 52,259 |
| Percentage | 47.98% | 29.44% | 20.99% |
- County results Gore: 30–40% 40–50% 50–60% Burford: 30–40% 40–50%
U.S. senator before election
Thomas Gore
Democratic
Elected U.S. senator
Thomas Gore
Democratic

Oklahoma election
| Party | Candidate | Votes | % |
|---|---|---|---|
| Democratic | Thomas Gore (incumbent) | 119,443 | 47.98 |
| Republican | John H. Burford | 73,292 | 29.44 |
| Socialist | Patrick S. Nagle | 52,259 | 20.99 |
| Progressive | William O. Cromwell | 3,966 | 1.59 |
| Majority | | 46,151 | 18.54 |
| Total votes | | 248,960 | 100.00 |
| Democratic hold | | | |

== Oregon ==
1914 United States Senate election in Oregon
- November 3, 1914
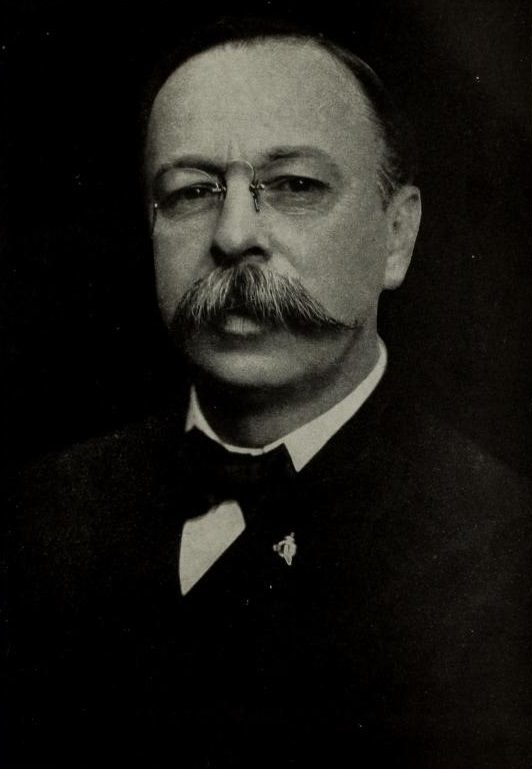

| Nominee | George E. Chamberlain | R. A. Booth | Bill Hanley |
| Party | Democratic | Republican | Progressive |
| Popular vote | 111,748 | 88,297 | 26,220 |
| Percentage | 45.50% | 35.95% | 10.68% |
- County results Chamberlain: 40–50% 50–60% Booth: 30–40% 40–50% Hanley: 40–50%
U.S. senator before election
George E. Chamberlain
Democratic
Elected U.S. senator
George E. Chamberlain
Democratic

Oregon election
| Party | Candidate | Votes | % |
|---|---|---|---|
| Democratic | George E. Chamberlain (incumbent) | 111,748 | 45.50 |
| Republican | R. A. Booth | 88,297 | 35.95 |
| Progressive | Bill Hanley | 28,220 | 10.68 |
| Socialist | Benjamin Franklin Ramp | 10,666 | 4.34 |
| Prohibition | H. S. Stine | 8,649 | 3.52 |
| Majority | | 23,451 | 9.55 |
| Total votes | | 245,580 | 100.00 |
| Democratic hold | | | |

== Pennsylvania ==
1914 United States Senate election in Pennsylvania
- November 3, 1914
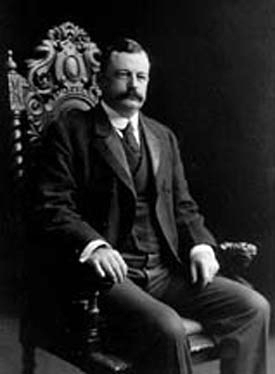

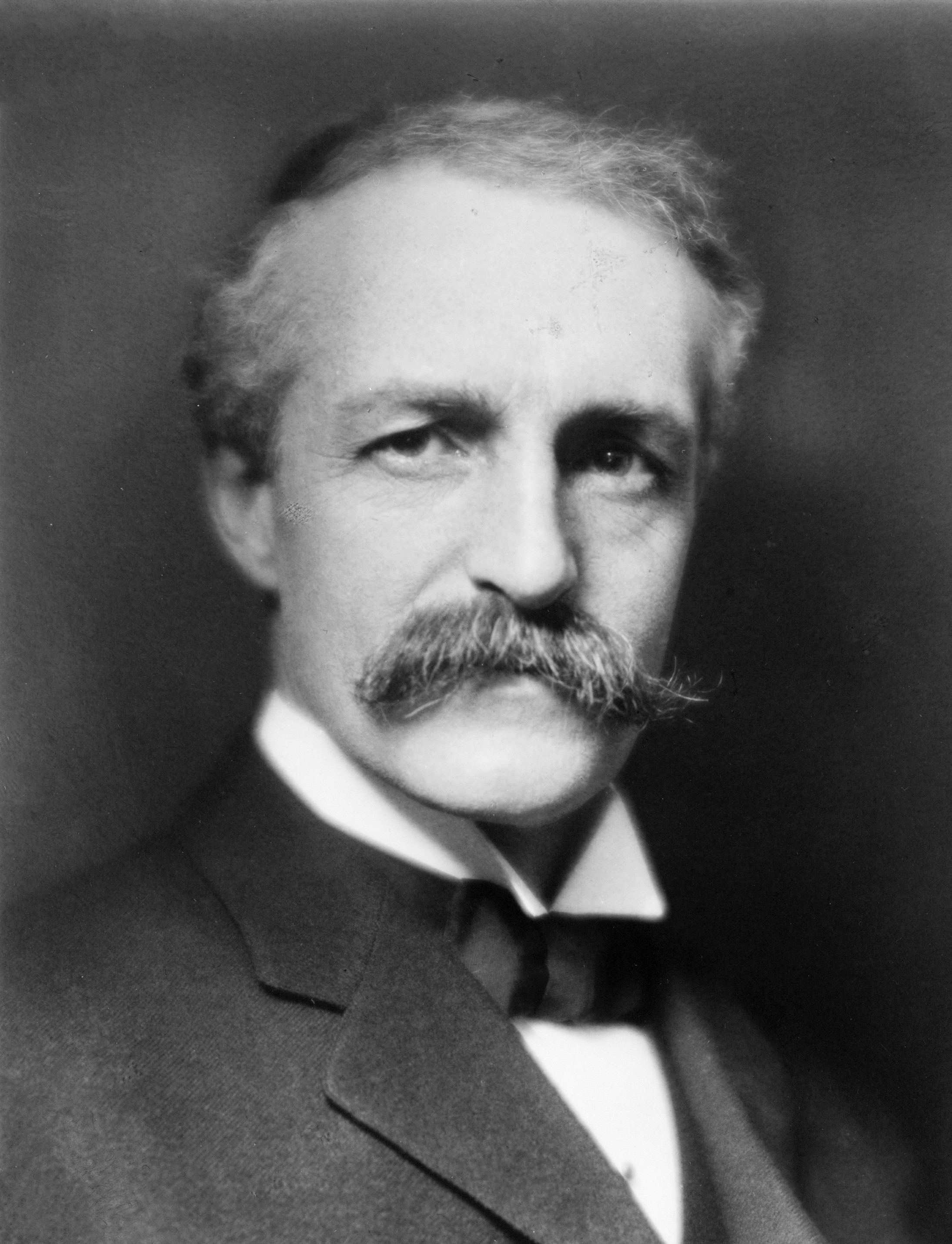

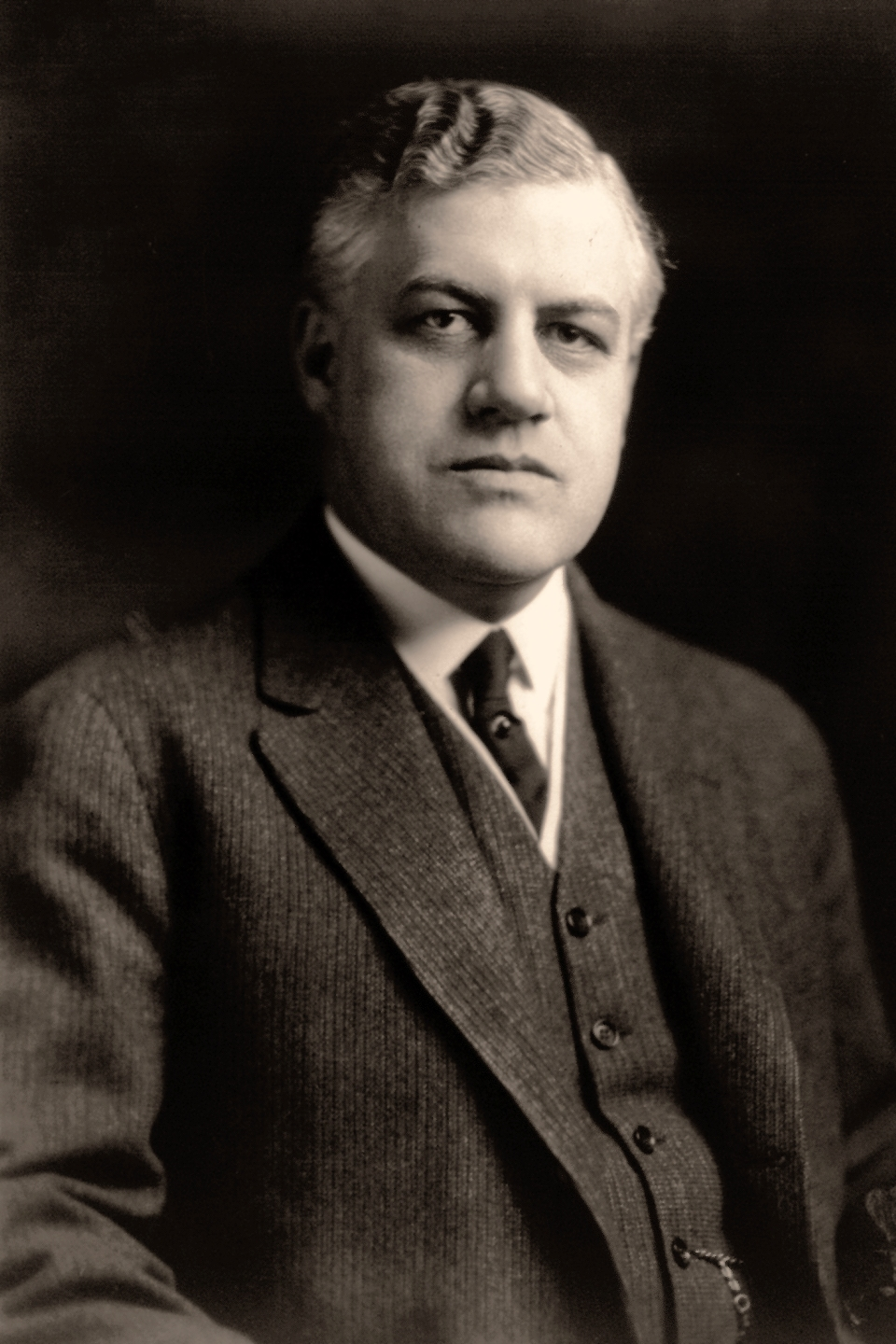
| Nominee | Boies Penrose | Gifford Pinchot | Alexander M. Palmer |
| Party | Republican | Progressive | Democratic |
| Popular vote | 519,810 | 269,265 | 266,436 |
| Percentage | 46.75% | 24.22% | 23.96% |
- County results Penrose: 20–30% 30–40% 40–50% 50–60% 60–70% Pinchot: 30–40% 40–50% Palmer: 30–40% 40–50% 50–60% 60–70%
U.S. senator before election
Boies Penrose
Republican
Elected U.S. senator
Boies Penrose
Republican

Pennsylvania election
| Party | Candidate | Votes | % |
|---|---|---|---|
| Republican | Boies Penrose (incumbent) | 519,810 | 46.75 |
| Progressive | Gifford Pinchot | 269,265 | 24.22 |
| Democratic | Alexander Mitchell Palmer | 266,436 | 23.96 |
| Socialist | Fred W. Whiteside | 37,950 | 3.41 |
| Prohibition | Madison F. Larkin | 17,685 | 1.59 |
| Industrial | A. S. Landis | 680 | 0.06 |
| Write-in | | 106 | 0.01 |
| Majority | | 250,545 | 22.53 |
| Total votes | | 1,111,932 | 100.00 |
| Republican hold | | | |

== South Carolina ==
1914 United States Senate election in South Carolina
- November 3, 1914
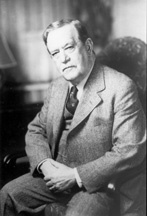
| Nominee | Ellison D. Smith |
| Party | Democratic |
| Popular vote | 32,950 |
| Percentage | 99.73% |
U.S. senator before election
Ellison D. Smith
Democratic
Elected U.S. senator
Ellison D. Smith
Democratic

South Carolina election
| Party | Candidate | Votes | % |
|---|---|---|---|
| Democratic | Ellison D. Smith (incumbent) | 32,950 | 99.73 |
| Socialist | J. H. Roberts | 89 | 0.27 |
| Majority | | 32,861 | 99.46 |
| Total votes | | 33,039 | 100.00 |
| Democratic hold | | | |

== South Dakota ==
1914 United States Senate election in South Dakota
- November 3, 1914
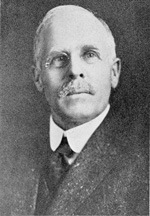

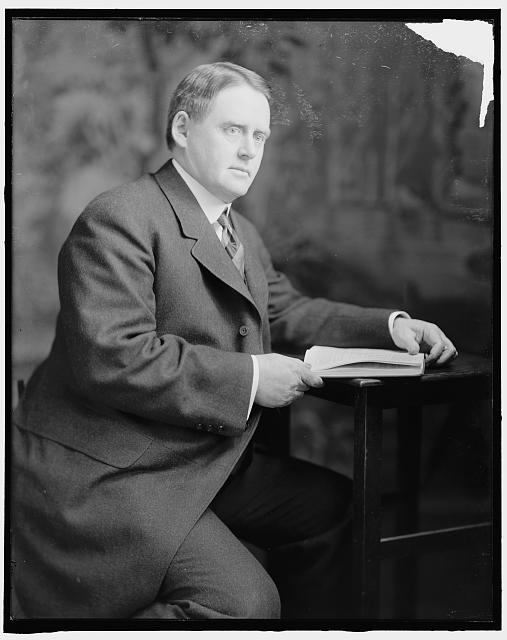
| Nominee | Edwin S. Johnson | Charles H. Burke |
| Party | Democratic | Republican |
| Popular vote | 48,076 | 44,244 |
| Percentage | 48.32% | 44.47% |
- County results Johnson: 40–50% 50–60% 60–70% Burke: 40–50% 50–60% 60–70% 70–80%
U.S. senator before election
Coe I. Crawford
Republican
Elected U.S. senator
Edwin S. Johnson
Democratic

South Dakota election
| Party | Candidate | Votes | % |
|---|---|---|---|
| Democratic | Edwin S. Johnson | 48,076 | 48.32 |
| Republican | Charles H. Burke | 44,244 | 44.47 |
| Socialist | E. P. Johnson | 2,674 | 2.69 |
| Prohibition | O. W. Butterfield | 2,406 | 2.42 |
| Independent | H. L. Loucks | 2,104 | 2.11 |
| Majority | | 3,832 | 3.85 |
| Total votes | | 99,504 | 100.00 |
| Democratic gain from Republican | | | |

== Utah ==
1914 United States Senate election in Utah
- November 3, 1914
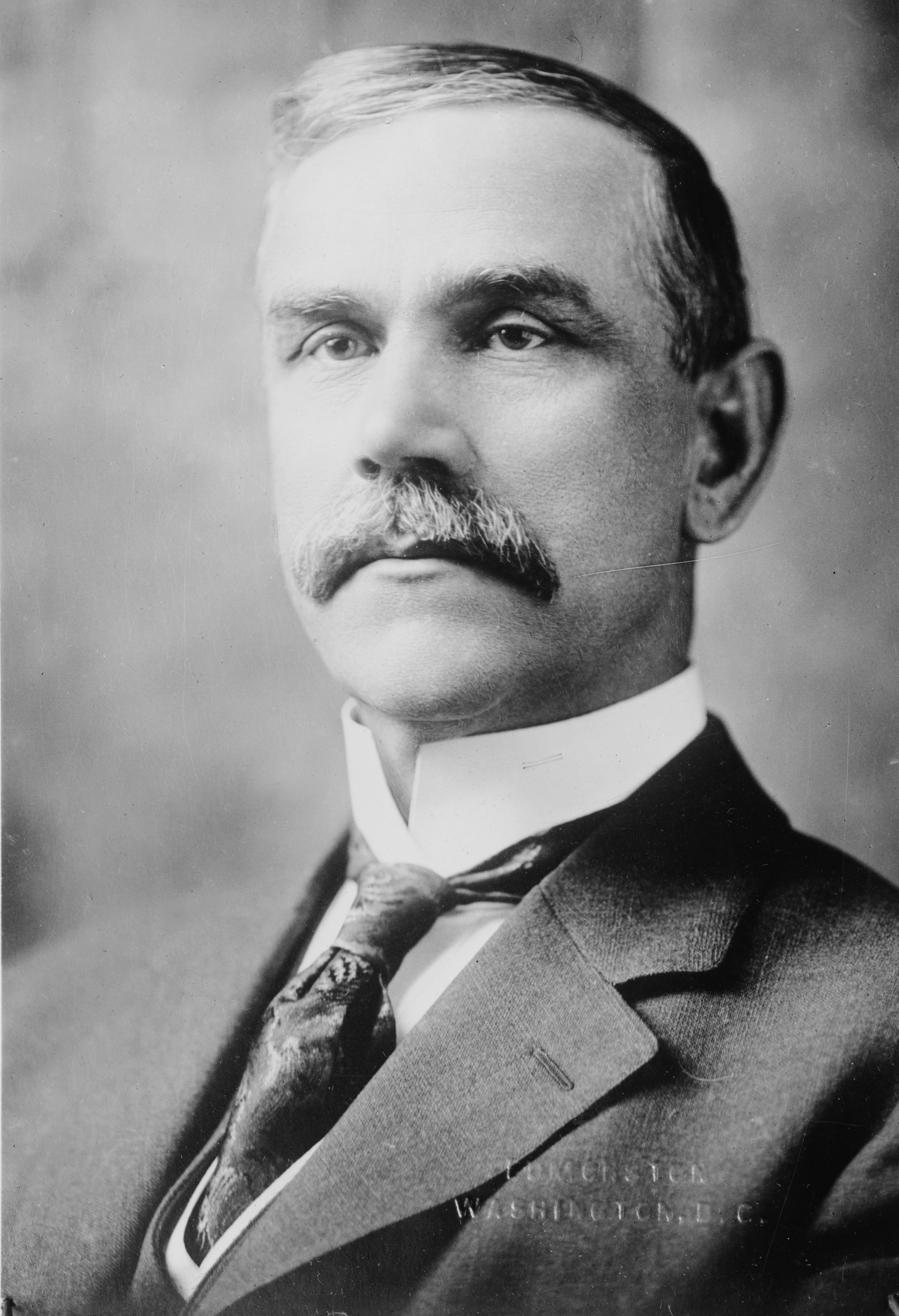

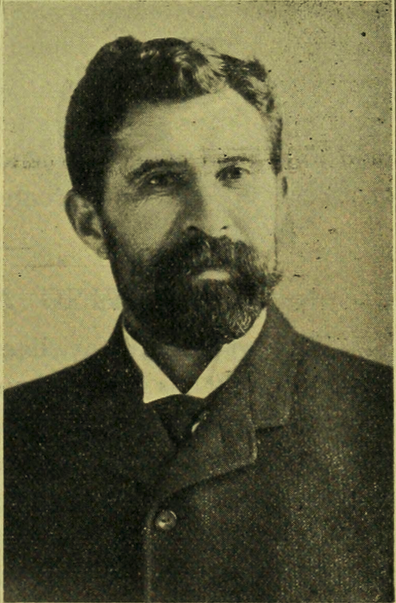
| Nominee | Reed Smoot | James Moyle |
| Party | Republican | Democratic |
| Popular vote | 56,281 | 53,128 |
| Percentage | 49.08% | 46.33% |
- County results Smoot: 40–50% 50–60% 60–70% 70–80% Moyle: 40–50% 50–60%
U.S. senator before election
Reed Smoot
Republican
Elected U.S. senator
Reed Smoot
Republican

Utah election
| Party | Candidate | Votes | % |
|---|---|---|---|
| Republican | Reed Smoot (incumbent) | 56,281 | 49.08 |
| Democratic | James Moyle | 53,128 | 46.33 |
| Socialist | J. F. Parsons | 5,257 | 4.59 |
| Majority | | 3,163 | 2.75 |
| Total votes | | 114,666 | 100.00 |
| Republican hold | | | |

== Vermont ==
1914 United States Senate election in Vermont
- November 3, 1914
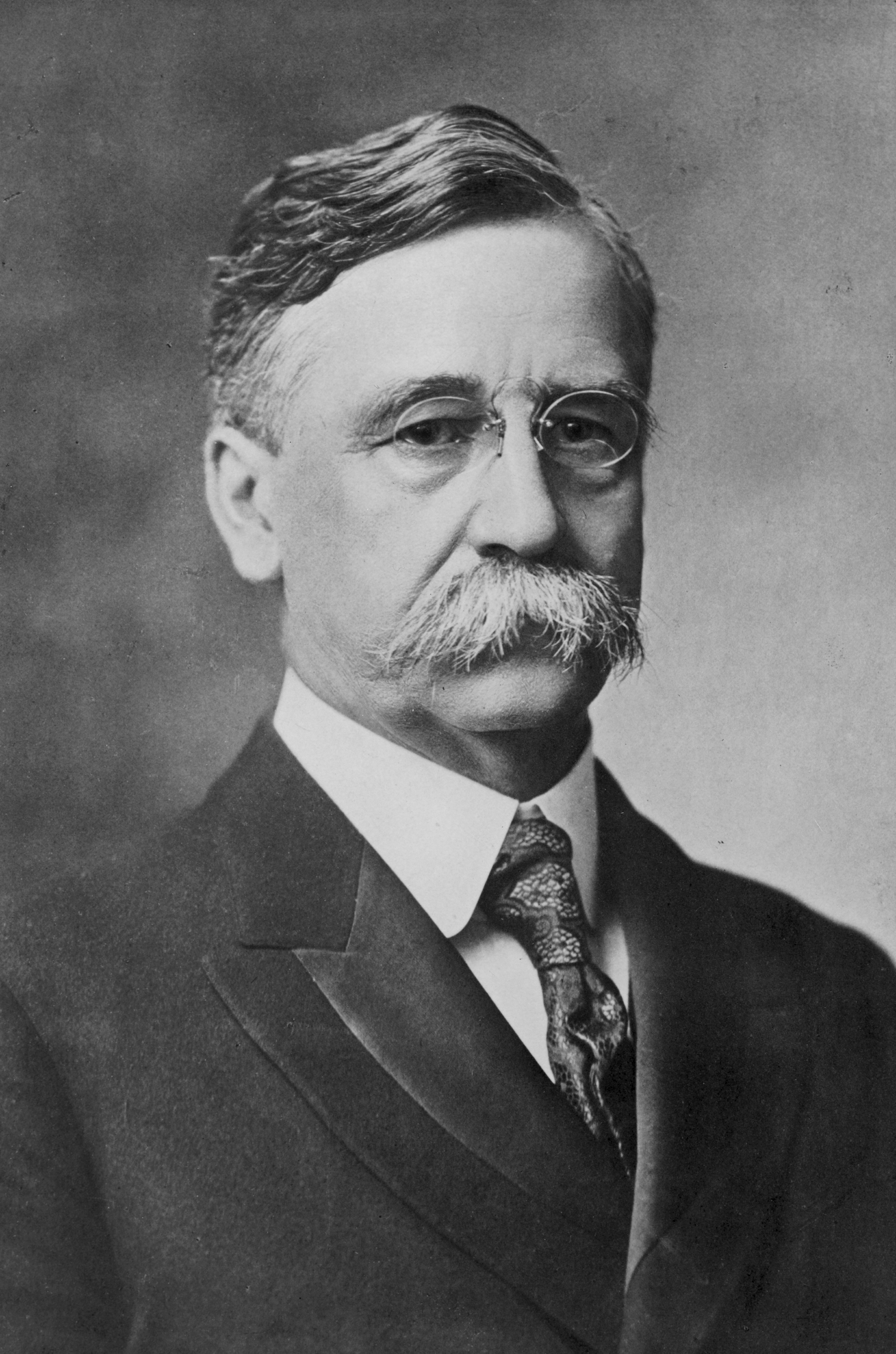

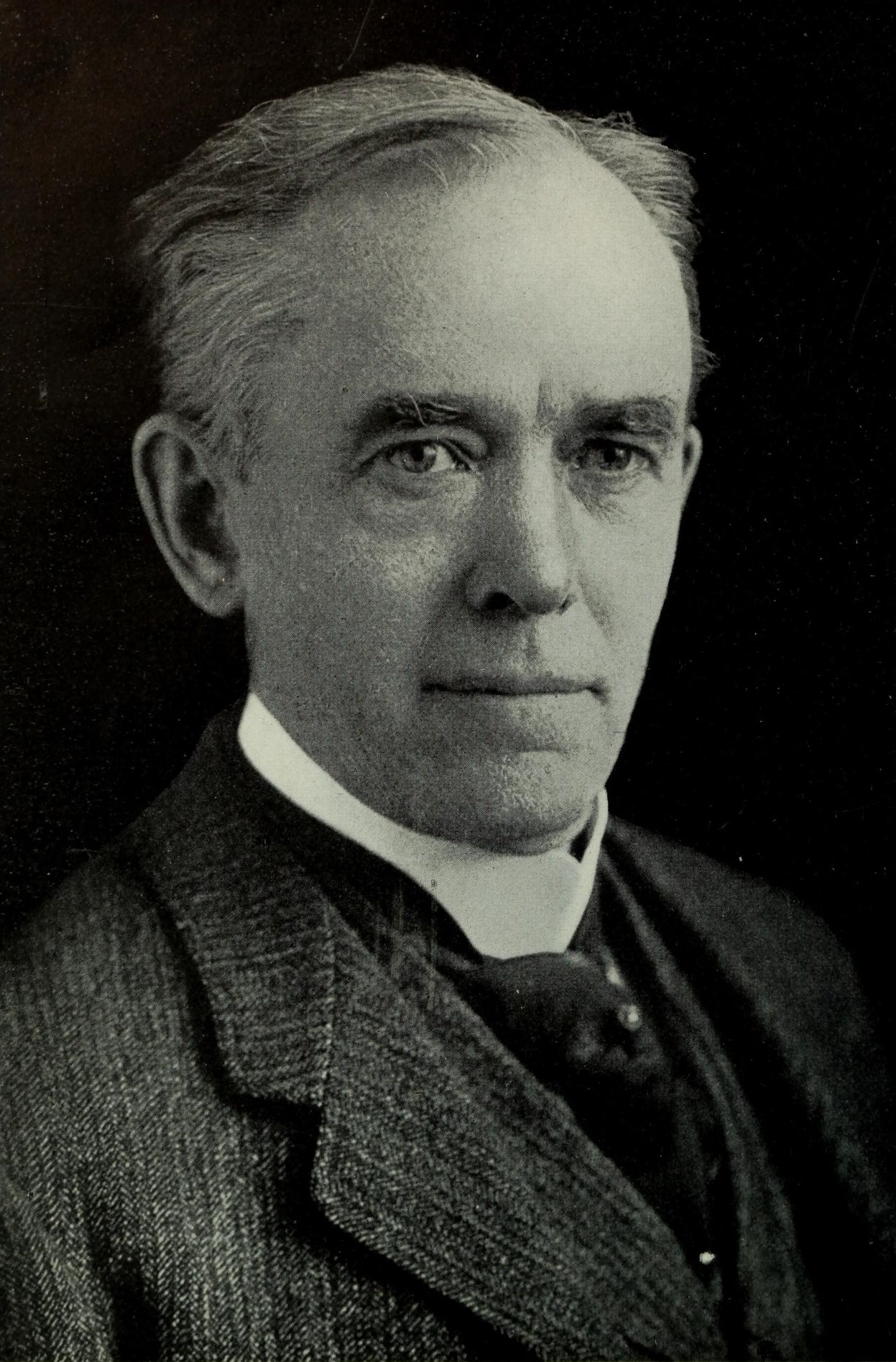
| Nominee | William P. Dillingham | Charles A. Prouty |
| Party | Republican | Progressive |
| Alliance | | Parties: Democratic; Prohibition; Ind. Republican; Independent |
| Popular vote | 35,137 | 26,766 |
| Percentage | 56.05% | 42.6% |
- County results Dillingham: 50–60% 60–70% Prouty: 50–60%
U.S. senator before election
William P. Dillingham
Republican
Elected U.S. senator
William P. Dillingham
Republican

Vermont election
| Party | Candidate | Votes | % |
|---|---|---|---|
| Republican | William P. Dillingham (inc.) | 35,137 | 56.0% |
| Democratic | Charles A. Prouty | 16,306 | 26.0% |
| Progressive | Charles A. Prouty | 7,339 | 11.7% |
| Nonpartisan | Charles A. Prouty | 1,592 | 2.5% |
| Prohibition | Charles A. Prouty | 1,526 | 2.4% |
| Republican | Charles A. Prouty | 3 | 0.0% |
| Total | Charles A. Prouty | 26,766 | 42.6% |
| Socialist | James Canfield | 772 | 1.2% |
| N/A | Other | 20 | 0.0% |
| Total votes | | 62,695 | 100.00% |

== Washington ==
1914 United States Senate election in Washington
- November 3, 1914
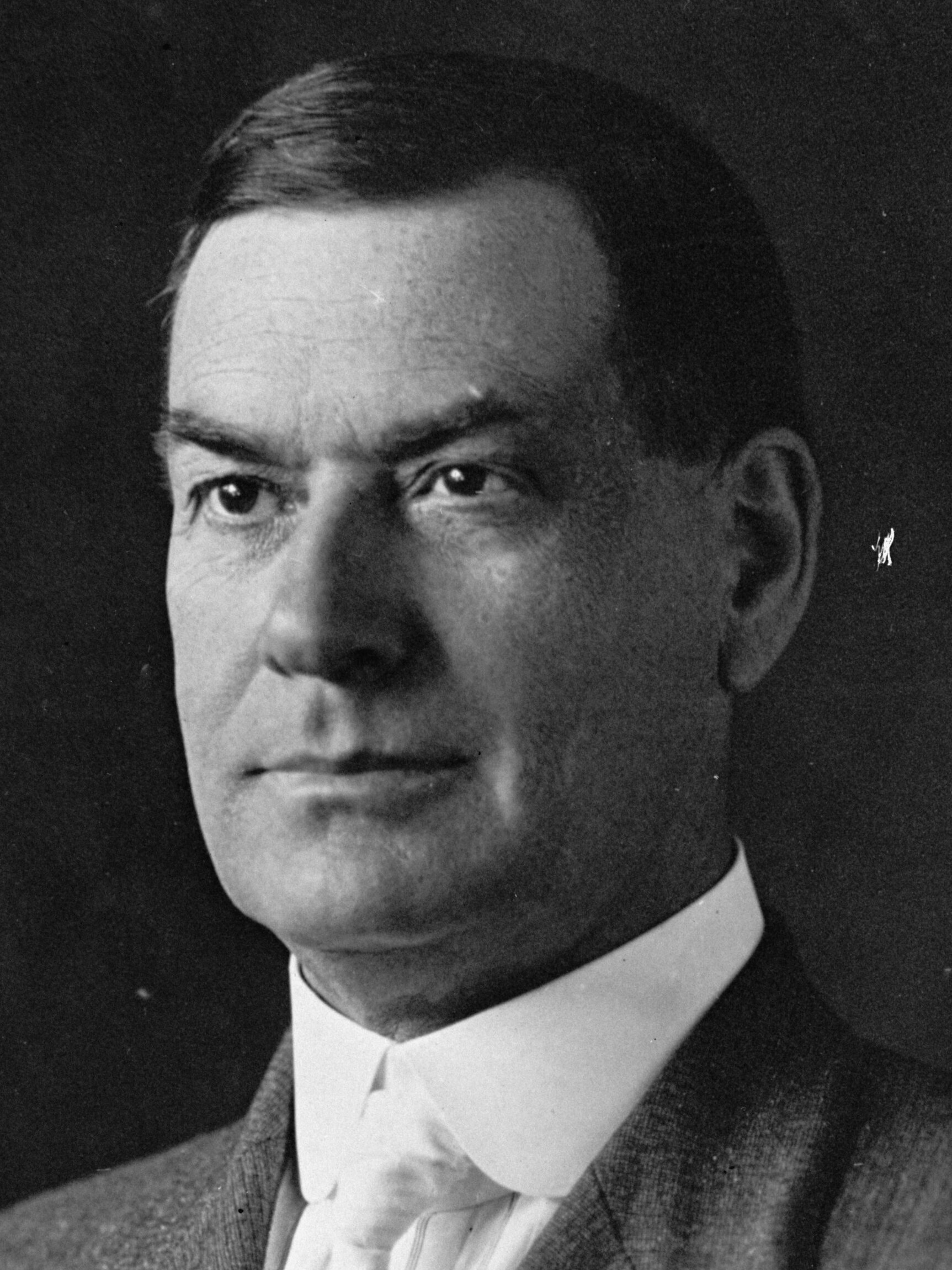

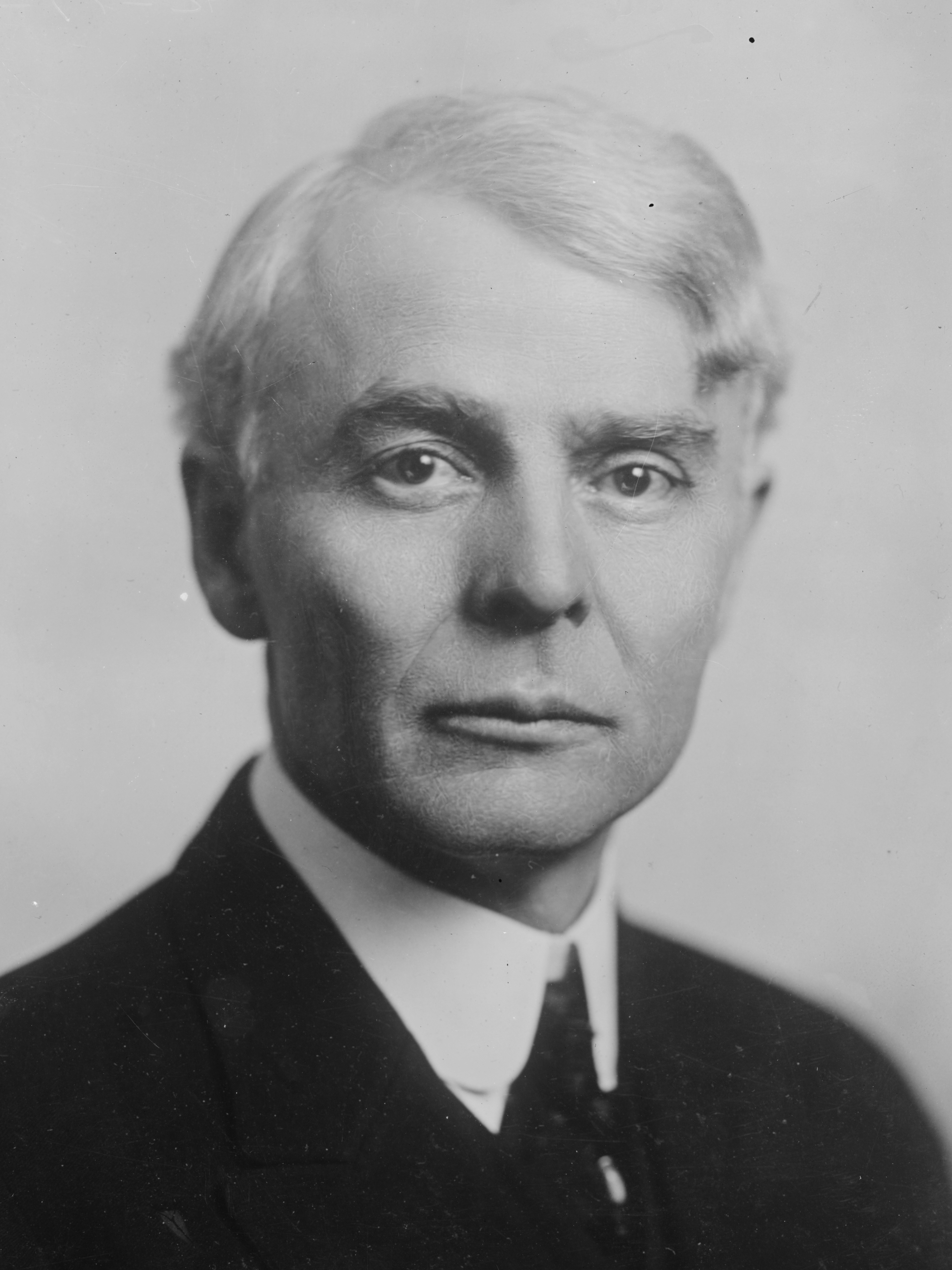
| Nominee | Wesley L. Jones | William W. Black |
| Party | Republican | Democratic |
| Popular vote | 130,479 | 91,733 |
| Percentage | 37.79% | 26.57% |
| Nominee | Ole Hanson | Adam H. Barth |
| Party | Progressive | Socialist |
| Popular vote | 83,282 | 30,234 |
| Percentage | 24.12% | 8.76% |
- Results by county Jones: 20–30% 30–40% 40–50% 50–60% 60–70% Black: 30–40% 40–50% Hanson: 20–30% 30–40%
U.S. senator before election
Wesley L. Jones
Republican
Elected U.S. senator
Wesley L. Jones
Republican

Washington election
| Party | Candidate | Votes | % |
|---|---|---|---|
| Republican | Wesley Livsey Jones (incumbent) | 130,479 | 37.79 |
| Democratic | William Wilson Black | 91,733 | 26.57 |
| Progressive | Ole Hanson | 83,282 | 24.12 |
| Socialist | Adam H. Barth | 30,234 | 8.76 |
| Prohibition | Arthur S. Caton | 9,551 | 2.77 |
| Majority | | 38,746 | 11.22 |
| Total votes | | 345,279 | 100.00 |
| Republican hold | | | |

== Wisconsin ==
1914 United States Senate election in Wisconsin
- November 3, 1914
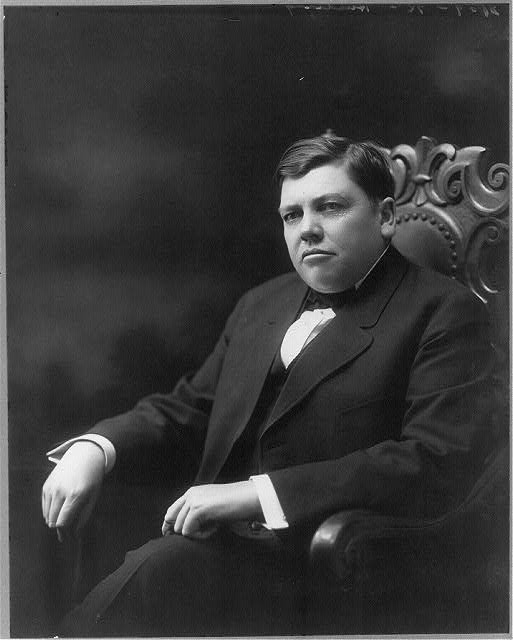

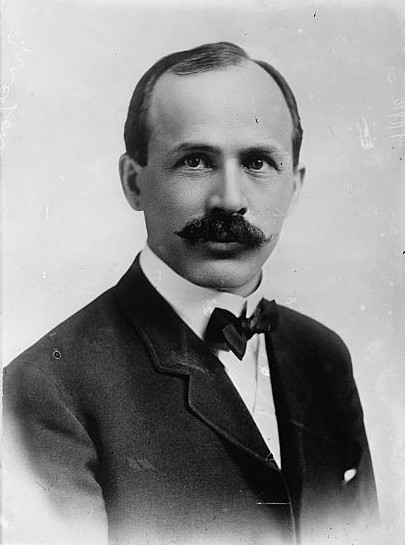

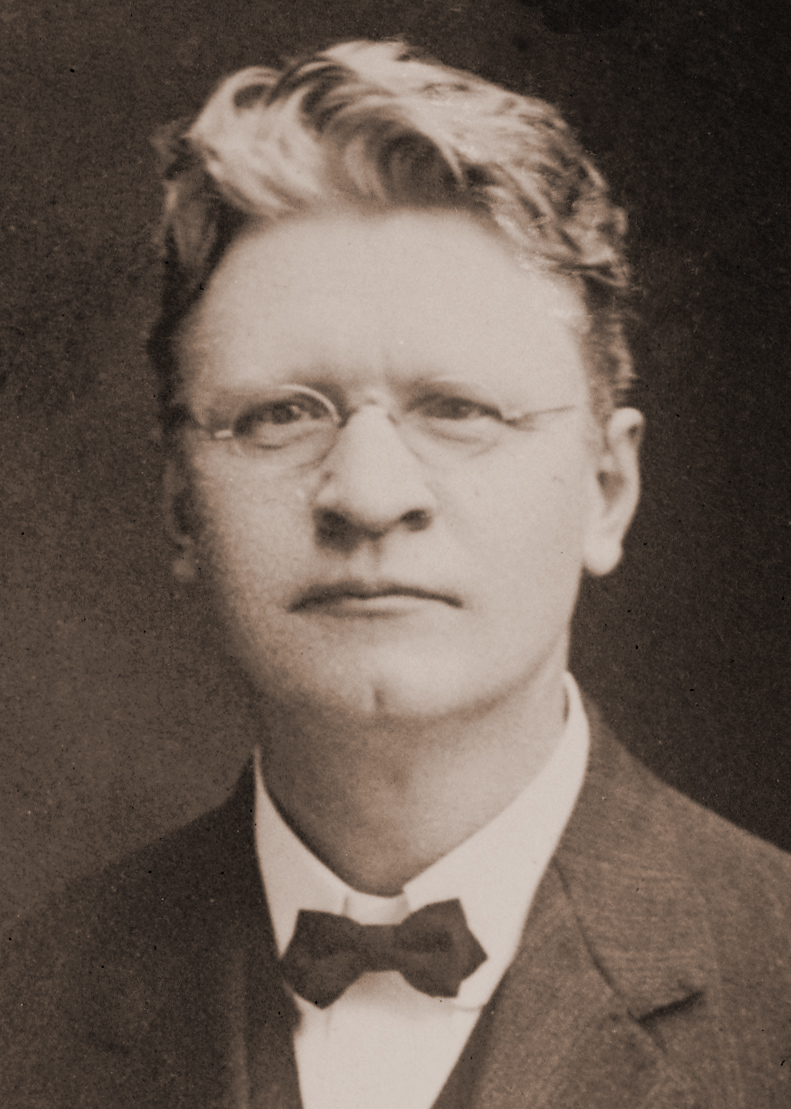
| Nominee | Paul O. Husting | Francis E. McGovern | Emil Seidel |
| Party | Democratic | Republican | Socialist |
| Popular vote | 134,925 | 133,969 | 29,774 |
| Percentage | 43.81% | 43.50% | 9.67% |
- County results Husting: 30–40% 40–50% 50–60% 60–70% 70–80% McGovern: 40–50% 50–60% 60–70% 70–80%
U.S. senator before election
Isaac Stephenson
Republican
Elected U.S. senator
Paul O. Husting
Democratic

Wisconsin election
| Party | Candidate | Votes | % |
|---|---|---|---|
| Democratic | Paul O. Husting | 134,925 | 43.81 |
| Republican | Francis E. McGovern | 133,969 | 43.50 |
| Socialist | Emil Seidel | 29,774 | 9.67 |
| Prohibition | Charles L. Hill | 9,276 | 3.01 |
| Write-in | | 58 | 0.02 |
| Majority | | 956 | 0.31 |
| Total votes | | 308,002 | 100.00 |
| Democratic gain from Republican | | | |

== See also ==
- 1914 United States elections
  - 1914 United States House of Representatives elections
- 63rd United States Congress
- 64th United States Congress

== Bibliography ==
- "Party Division in the Senate, 1789-Present". United States Senate – via Senate.gov.
- "United States Senators Chosen, 1912". The Tribune Almanac and Political Register 1913. New York: The Tribune Association. 1913. p. 457 – via HathiTrust Digital Library.
- Byrd, Robert C. (October 1, 1993). Wolff, Wendy (ed.). The Senate, 1789-1989: Historical Statistics, 1789–1992. United States Senate Historical Office (volume 4 Bicentennial ed.). Washington, D.C.: U.S. Government Printing Office. ISBN 9780160632563 – via Google Books.
- Cox, Harold (January 31, 2007). "Pennsylvania Election Statistics: 1682–2006". The Wilkes University Election Statistics Project. Wilkes University.
