= 1886 Vermont gubernatorial election =

- September 7, 1886
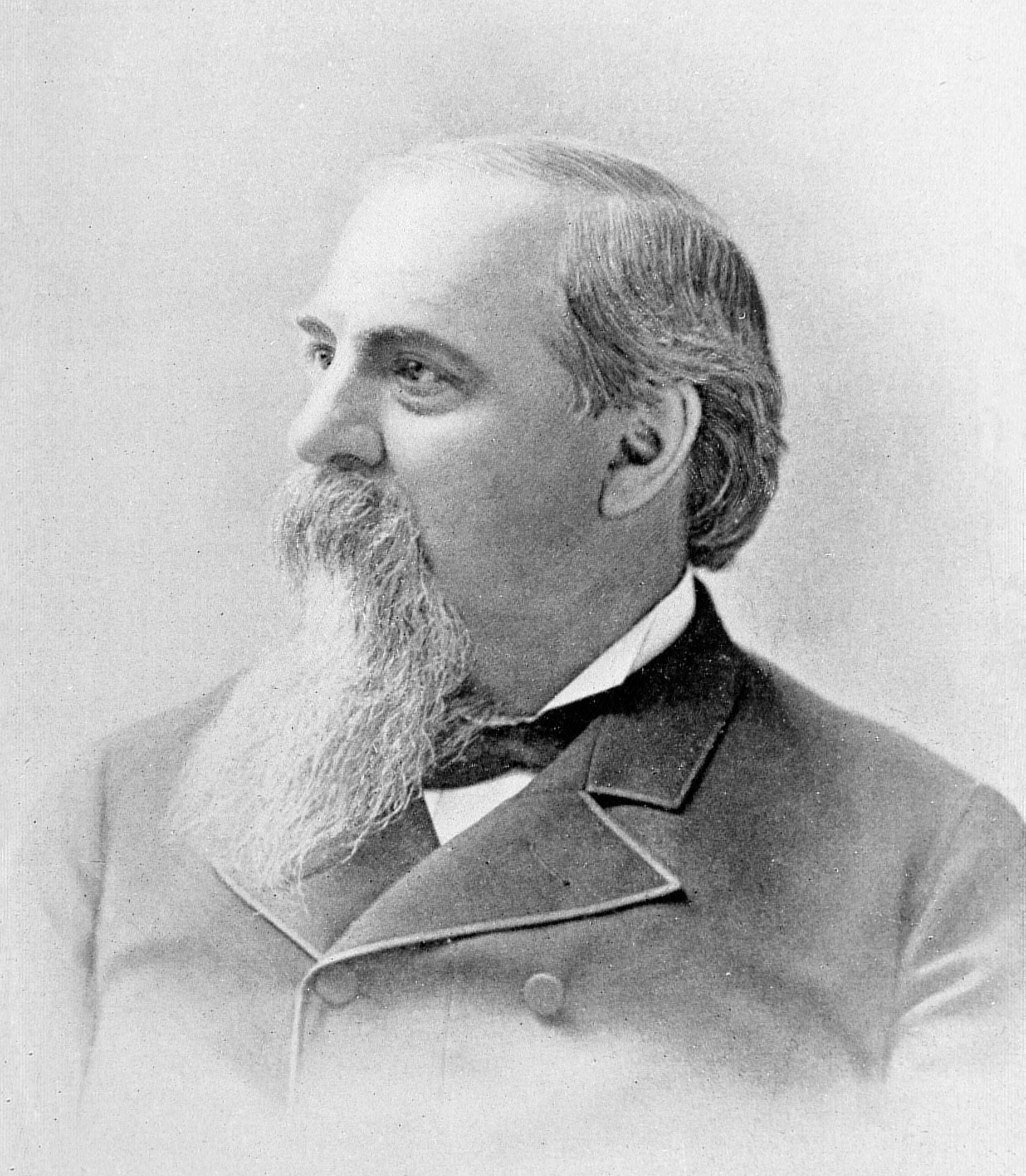

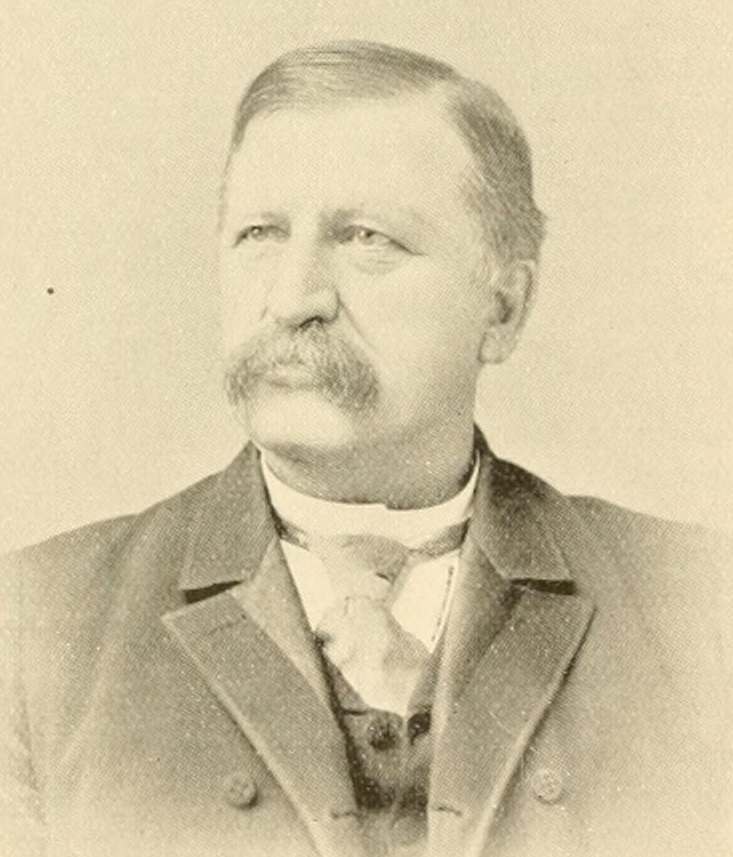
Nominee	Ebenezer J. Ormsbee	Stephen C. Shurtleff
Party	Republican	Democratic
Popular vote	37,709	17,187
Percentage	66.04%	30.10%
- County results Ormsbee: 50–60% 60–70% 70–80%
Governor before election
Samuel E. Pingree
Republican
Elected Governor
Ebenezer J. Ormsbee
Republican

The 1886 Vermont gubernatorial election took place on September 7, 1886. Incumbent Republican Samuel E. Pingree, per the "Mountain Rule", did not run for re-election to a second term as Governor of Vermont. Republican candidate Ebenezer J. Ormsbee defeated Democratic candidate Stephen C. Shurtleff to succeed him.

== Results ==
1886 Vermont gubernatorial election
Party	Candidate	Votes	%	±%
Republican	Ebenezer J. Ormsbee	37,709	66.04	−1.3
Democratic	Stephen C. Shurtleff	17,187	30.10	−1.3
Prohibition	Henry M. Seely	1,541	2.70	+2.7
Greenback	Truman B. Smith	644	1.13	+0.1
N/A	Other	18	0.03	+0.1
Total votes		57,099	100.0	–
