= 1888 Vermont gubernatorial election =

- September 4, 1888
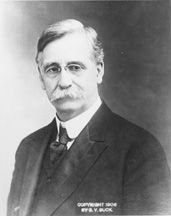

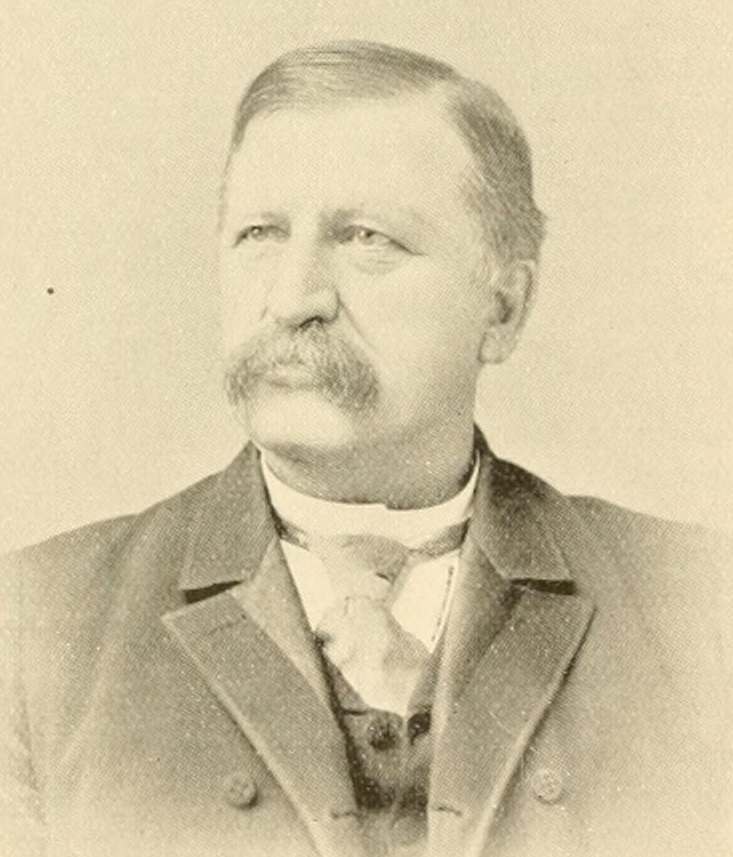
Nominee	William P. Dillingham	Stephen C. Shurtleff
Party	Republican	Democratic
Popular vote	48,522	19,527
Percentage	69.89%	28.13%
- County results Dillingham: 60–70% 70–80% 80–90%
Governor before election
Ebenezer J. Ormsbee
Republican
Elected Governor
William P. Dillingham
Republican

The 1888 Vermont gubernatorial election took place on September 4, 1888. Incumbent Republican Ebenezer J. Ormsbee, per the "Mountain Rule", did not run for re-election to a second term as Governor of Vermont. Republican candidate William P. Dillingham defeated Democratic candidate Stephen C. Shurtleff to succeed him.

== Results ==
1888 Vermont gubernatorial election
Party	Candidate	Votes	%	±%
Republican	William P. Dillingham	48,522	69.89	+3.9
Democratic	Stephen C. Shurtleff	19,527	28.13	−2.0
Prohibition	Henry M. Seely	1,372	1.97	−0.7
N/A	Other	5	0.01	−0.1
Total votes		69,426	100.0	–
