= Charles A. Prouty =

American politician (1853–1921)

Charles Azro Prouty
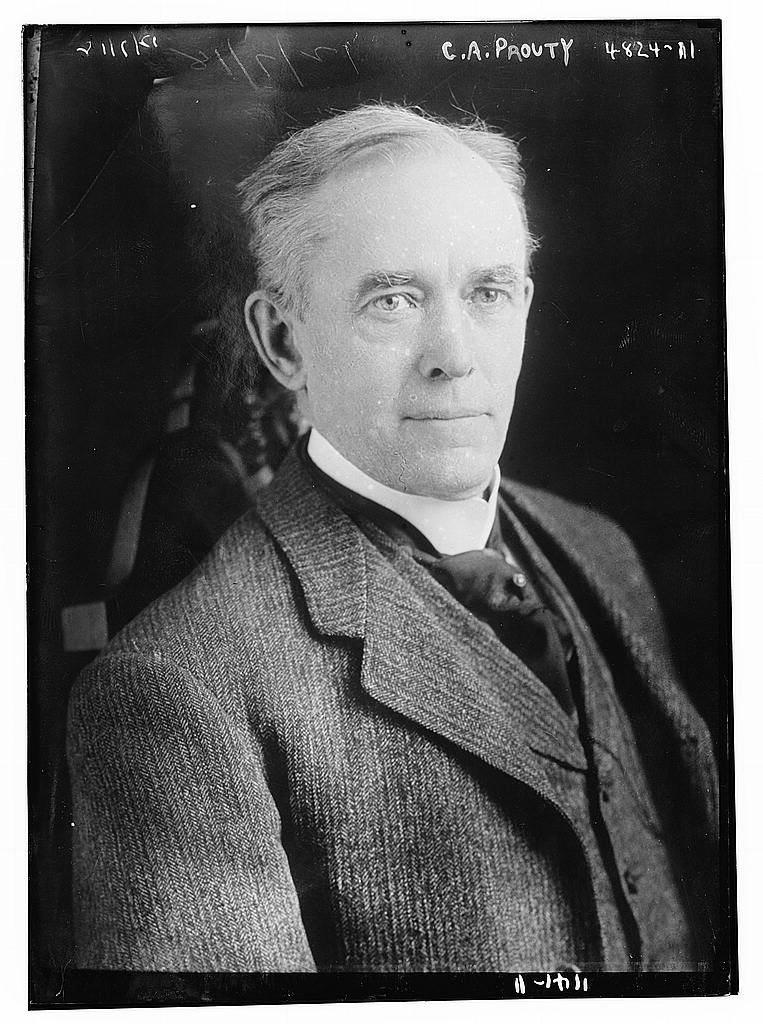
- Prouty in 1918

Chairman of the Interstate Commerce Commission
- In office 1912–1913
- Preceded by: Judson C. Clements
- Succeeded by: Franklin Knight Lane

Member of the Interstate Commerce Commission
- In office 1896–1914
- Preceded by: Wheelock G. Veazey
- Succeeded by: Henry Clay Hall

Member of the Vermont House of Representatives
- In office 1888–1890
- Preceded by: Darius L. Hildreth
- Succeeded by: Homer Thrasher
- Constituency: Newport

State's Attorney of Orleans County, Vermont
- In office 1882–1886
- Preceded by: Frederick W. Baldwin
- Succeeded by: Frank E. Alfred

Personal details
- Born: October 9, 1853 Newport, Vermont, U.S.
- Died: July 8, 1921 (aged 67) Newport, Vermont, U.S.
- Resting place: East Main Street Cemetery, Newport, Vermont
- Party: Republican
- Spouse: Abbie Davis (m. 1879)
- Children: 2
- Education: Dartmouth College
- Profession: Attorney; Businessman; Public official

Charles Azro Prouty (October 9, 1853 – July 8, 1921) was an American Republican politician and government official who was involved with reform movements including the Progressive and Prohibition Parties. He served as a commissioner of the Interstate Commerce Commission (ICC) from 1896 to 1914. He was an unsuccessful candidate for the United States Senate from Vermont in 1914, losing to incumbent Republican senator William P. Dillingham.

== Early life ==
Prouty was born on October 9, 1853, in Newport, Vermont, to John Azro Prouty and Hannah Barker Lamb.

In 1875, Prouty graduated at the top of his class at Dartmouth College. He worked briefly at the Alleghany City Observatory in Pennsylvania, but ill health forced his return to Vermont, where he studied law with Theophilus Grout and was admitted to the bar in 1877.

== Vermont businessman and politician ==
Prouty was twice elected State's Attorney of Orleans County (1882 and 1884), and in 1888 he won a term in the Vermont House of Representatives. He served as principal of Newport Academy for two years. From 1888 to 1896, Prouty served as Reporter of Decisions for the Vermont Supreme Court. He also helped to found the Orleans Trust Company and the Newport Electric Company. He served as general counsel for the Rutland and Central Vermont Railroads.

== Interstate Commerce Commission ==
On December 14, 1896, President Grover Cleveland nominated Prouty to the ICC. Prouty was confirmed by the Senate on December 17, and was sworn in on December 21 to serve an unexpired term ending in 1901. President Theodore Roosevelt reappointed him in 1901 and in 1907. Prouty served a one-year term, elected by his fellow commissioners, as chairman of the commission from 1912 to 1913. While on the commission, he urged Congress to increase regulation of railroad rates, and allow the Commission to value railroad property. When Congress finally passed the Valuation Act in 1913, Prouty resigned, effective in 1914, to become the commission's first director of valuation.

Prouty ran for Senator from Vermont in 1914, but lost to incumbent Republican Senator William P. Dillingham. Prouty had received the endorsement of the Prohibition and Progressive parties, while failing to win the Democratic nomination at the state Democratic convention. When Democratic nominee Charles D. Watson withdrew, the party's state committee substituted Prouty. In the general election, Prouty was defeated by about 7,000 votes.

== Later life ==
In 1915, Prouty received the honorary degree of LL.D. from Dartmouth College.

In 1918, Prouty became the United States Railroad Administration's director of the Division of Public Service and Accounting.

On July 8, 1921, he died at his Newport home. He was buried at East Main Street Cemetery in Newport.

== Family ==
In 1879, Prouty married Abbie Davis of Lyndonville. They were the parents of two sons, Ward and John.

Charles Prouty was the brother of Governor George H. Prouty and the uncle of United States Senator Winston L. Prouty.

== Notes ==
Party political offices
First	Democratic nominee for U.S. Senator from Vermont (Class 3); 1914	Succeeded by Howard E. Shaw
