= John Prout =

John Prout may refer to:

- John Prout (politician) (1815–1890), Vermont attorney, politician, and judge
- John T. Prout (1880–1969), Irish-American soldier
- John Skinner Prout (1805–1876), British painter, writer, lithographer and art teacher
