= Governor Pingree =

Governor Pingree may refer to:

- Hannah Pingree (born 1976), 76th Governor-elect of Maine
- Hazen S. Pingree (1840–1901), 24th Governor of Michigan
- Samuel E. Pingree (1832–1922), 40th Governor of Vermont
