= 1884 Vermont gubernatorial election =

- September 2, 1884
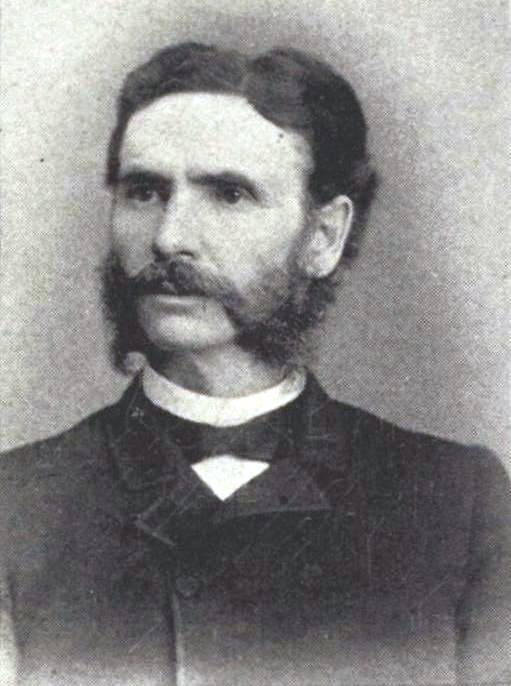

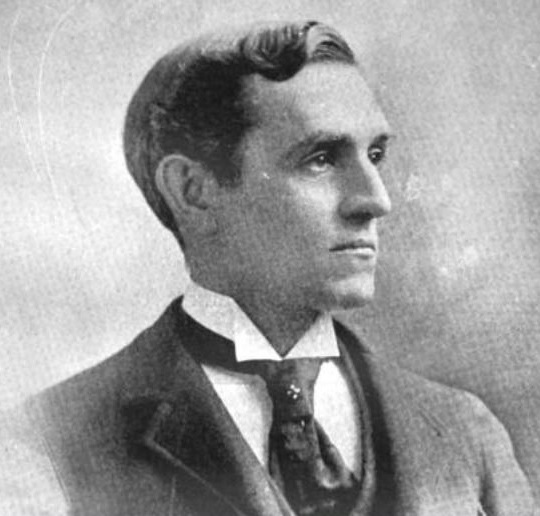
Nominee	Samuel E. Pingree	Lyman W. Redington
Party	Republican	Democratic
Popular vote	42,524	19,820
Percentage	67.29%	31.36%
- County results Pingree: 50–60% 60–70% 70–80% 80–90%
Governor before election
John L. Barstow
Republican
Elected Governor
Samuel E. Pingree
Republican

The 1884 Vermont gubernatorial election took place on September 2, 1884. Incumbent Republican John L. Barstow, per the "Mountain Rule", did not run for re-election to a second term as Governor of Vermont. Republican candidate Samuel E. Pingree defeated Democratic candidate Lyman W. Redington to succeed him.

== Results ==
1884 Vermont gubernatorial election
Party	Candidate	Votes	%	±%
Republican	Samuel E. Pingree	42,524	67.29	−1.8
Democratic	Lyman W. Redington	19,820	31.36	+3.5
Greenback	Samuel Soule	635	1.00	−2.0
Independent	Charles M. Stone	200	0.32	+0.3
N/A	Other	19	0.03	0.0
Total votes		63,198	100.0	–
