= 1920 United States Senate election in Vermont =

United States Senate election in Vermont, 1920
- November 2, 1920
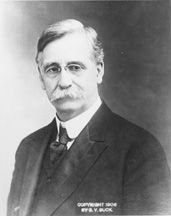

Nominee	William P. Dillingham	Howard Shaw
Party	Republican	Democratic
Popular vote	69,650	19,580
Percentage	78.06%	21.94%
U.S. senator before election
William P. Dillingham
Republican
Elected U.S. Senator
William P. Dillingham
Republican

The 1920 United States Senate election in Vermont took place on November 2, 1920. Incumbent Republican William P. Dillingham successfully ran for re-election to another term in the United States Senate, defeating Democratic candidate Howard E. Shaw. Dillingham died in July 1923, vacating the seat until a special election could be held in November 1923.

== Republican primary ==
=== Results ===
Republican primary results
Party	Candidate	Votes	%	±%
Republican	William P. Dillingham (inc.)	52,666	99.9%	
Republican	Other	45	0.1%	
Total votes		52,711	100.00%	

== Democratic primary ==
=== Results ===
Democratic primary results
Party	Candidate	Votes	%	±%
Democratic	Howard E. Shaw	9,375	99.9%	
Democratic	Other	12	0.1%	
Total votes		9,387	100.00%	

== General election ==
=== Results ===
United States Senate election in Vermont, 1920
Party	Candidate	Votes	%	±%
Republican	William P. Dillingham (inc.)	69,650	78.06%	+22.02%
Democratic	Howard E. Shaw	19,580	21.94%	−4.07%
Total votes		89,230	100.00%	
