= Stephen C. Shurtleff =

Vermont attorney and politician (1838–1898)

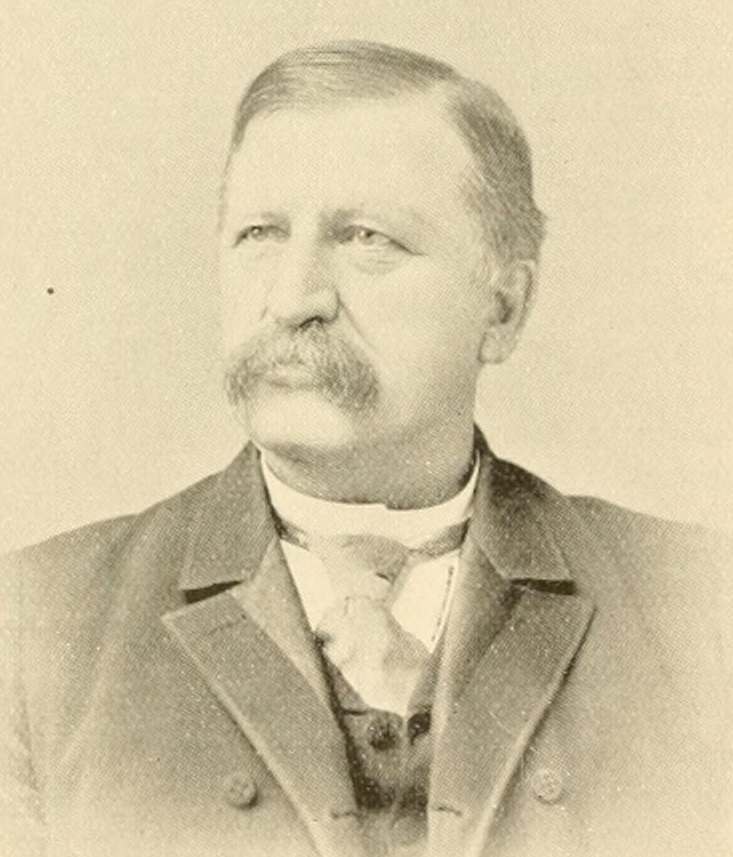
- From Volume II (1903) of Men of Vermont Illustrated

Member of the Vermont House of Representatives
- In office 1874–1876
- Preceded by: L. Cheney Batchelder
- Succeeded by: Nathaniel Townsend Jr.
- Constituency: Plainfield

Personal details
- Born: 13 January 1838 Walden, Vermont, US
- Died: 27 August 1898 (aged 60) Montpelier, Vermont, US
- Resting place: Green Mount Cemetery, Montpelier, Vermont, US
- Party: Democratic
- Spouse: Elizabeth M. Pratt (m. 1868–1898)
- Children: 2
- Profession: Attorney

Stephen C. Shurtleff (13 January 1838 – 27 August 1898) was an American attorney and politician from Vermont. A Democrat, he served in the Vermont House of Representatives from 1874 to 1876 and was the party's nominee for governor in 1886 and 1888 and Vermont's 2nd congressional district in 1890.

== Early life ==
Stephen Currier Shurtleff was born in Walden, Vermont on 13 January 1838, a son of Abial and Rebecca (Currier) Shurtleff. He was raised and educated in Walden and attended academies in Glover, Newbury, and Morrisville while teaching school to pay his tuition. He also served in local offices in Walden, including school superintendent. Shurtleff studied law with Charles H. Heath of Plainfield and attained admission to the bar in March 1863. He practiced in East Hardwick until September, when he relocated his practice to Plainfield.

A Democrat in politics during the more than 100 years when Republicans won every statewide election, Shurtleff ran unsuccessfully for local and county offices including Vermont Senate and state's attorney of Washington County. Shurtleff practiced in Plainfield until 1876. Despite his party affiliation, in 1874 he was elected to represent Plainfield in the Vermont House of Representatives. Shurtleff served one term, 1874 to 1876. After completing his term in the legislature, Shurtleff moved to Montpelier, where he continued to practice law.

== Continued career ==
Shurtleff became a successful practitioner of corporate law, including serving as counsel for the Montpelier and Wells River Railroad. He also developed a successful patent law practice in Vermont's federal courts. As his reputation grew, his practice increased to include service as counsel for the St. Johnsbury and Lake Champlain Railroad and the Grand Trunk Railway. In 1884, Shurtleff was nominated for associate justice of the Vermont Supreme Court; despite Republicans having an overwhelming majority in the Vermont General Assembly, it took two ballots for Republican William H. Walker to obtain enough votes to win, with the vote on the second ballot being 131 for Walker, 71 for Shurtleff, and 31 for Republican Laforrest H. Thompson. In 1885, he was admitted to practice before the United States Supreme Court.

In addition to practicing law, Shurtleff maintained his interest in Democratic politics. In 1886, he was the party's nominee for governor, and he was renominated In 1888. In 1890, he was the unsuccessful Democratic nominee in Vermont's 2nd congressional district. Shurtleff was also a delegate to the 1896 Democratic National Convention.

Shurtleff died in Montpelier on 27 August 1898. He was buried at Green Mount Cemetery in Montpelier.
