= United States Congressional Joint Immigration Commission =

Bipartisan special committee formed in 1907

United States Immigration Commission
- Dillingham Commission
- Members of the Dillingham Commission
- Named after: William P. Dillingham
- Formation: February 1907
- Founder: United States Congress, President Theodore Roosevelt
- Dissolved: 1911
- Type: Special committee
- Purpose: To study the origins and consequences of recent immigration to the United States
- Headquarters: Washington, D.C.
- Location: United States
- Fields: Immigration policy, social research
- Chairman: William P. Dillingham
- Main organ: Joint committee of House and Senate
- Budget: Over $1,000,000
- Staff: Over 300

The United States Immigration Commission (also known as the Dillingham Commission after its chairman, Republican Senator William P. Dillingham), was a bipartisan special committee formed in February 1907 by the United States Congress and President Theodore Roosevelt, to study the origins and consequences of recent immigration to the United States. This was in response to increasing political concerns about the effects of immigration and its brief was to report on the social, economic, and moral state of the nation. During its time in action, the Commission employed a staff of more than 300 people for over 3 years, spent better than a million dollars, and accumulated mass data.

It was a joint committee composed of members of both the House and Senate. The Commission published its findings in 1911, concluding that immigration from Eastern and Southern Europe was a serious threat to American society and culture and should be greatly reduced in the future, as well as continued restrictions on immigration from China, Japan, and Korea. The report highly influenced public opinion around the introduction of legislation to limit immigration and can be seen to have played an integral part in the adoption of the Emergency Quota Act in 1921 and the Johnson–Reed Act in 1924.

== Background ==
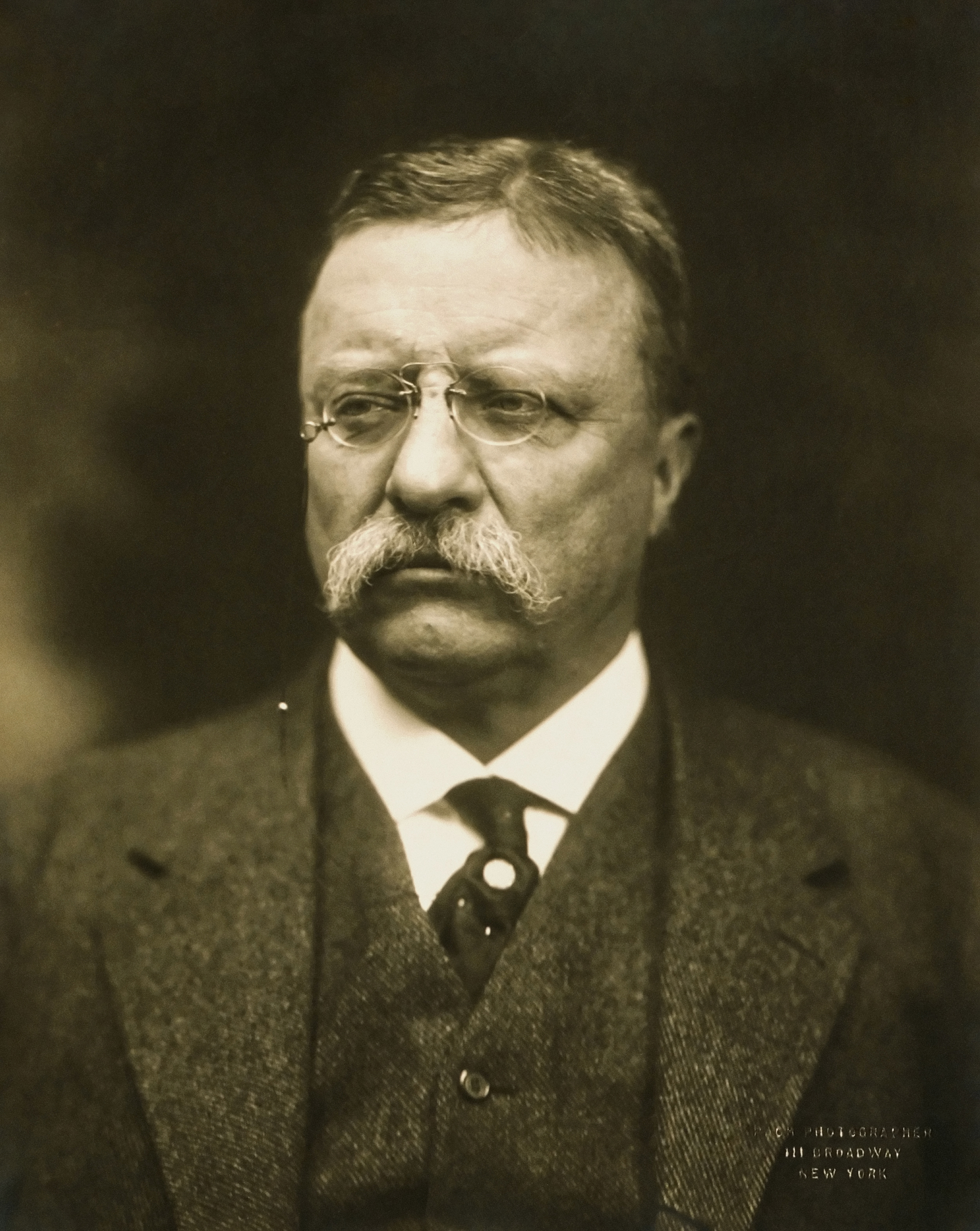
President Theodore Roosevelt helped set up the Commission.

In 1800, the American population was about 5 million, by 1914, migration had led to a further 50 million people in the country. The population had amassed to a total of 77 million, 14 years earlier, in 1900.

Historically, immigration policy had been based on economic arguments, but new research suggests eugenics as influencing public opinion on admission criteria. This change towards racial scientific theory was evident in the success of Madison Grant's works which argued that the old immigrant races were in danger of being overtaken by inferior races, particularly Eastern and Southern Europeans. Similarly, the work of Sir Francis Galton on advocating for eugenics found heightened interest and readership during the late 1800s, reflecting the growth of racial pseudoscience based ideas amongst the American public at the time.

Modern historians have continued to argue that eugenic ideology supported immigration policy. However, Katherine Benton-Cohen's recent work highlights the importance of economics within the Commission's thinking, in particular when referring to Commission member Jeremiah Jenks, arguing that it predates eugenics. In addition to this, pressure from labor leaders such as President Samuel Gompers of the American Federation of Labor to acknowledge the perceived negative effect of immigration on the American-born workforce helped influenced the formation of the Dillingham Commission. Nonetheless, this fails to acknowledge that the immigration debate had been around for decades as well as early ideas of racial distinctions and these factors continued to influence Commission members as much as economic ones.

Historian Robert F. Zeidel situated the Commission within the Progressive Era, with nativism as the motivation for the legal enforcement of immigration in this period. But before World War I, most restrictions were exclusively directed to the Asian population, without classification of races; factors such as income and education came first. Immigration acts had previously banned prostitutes, convicts, the insane, and those with serious illness or disability. Nativism changed this through moving toward a racial hierarchy which pitted the superior natives of the United States against the 'inferior' immigrants.

== Commission investigations ==
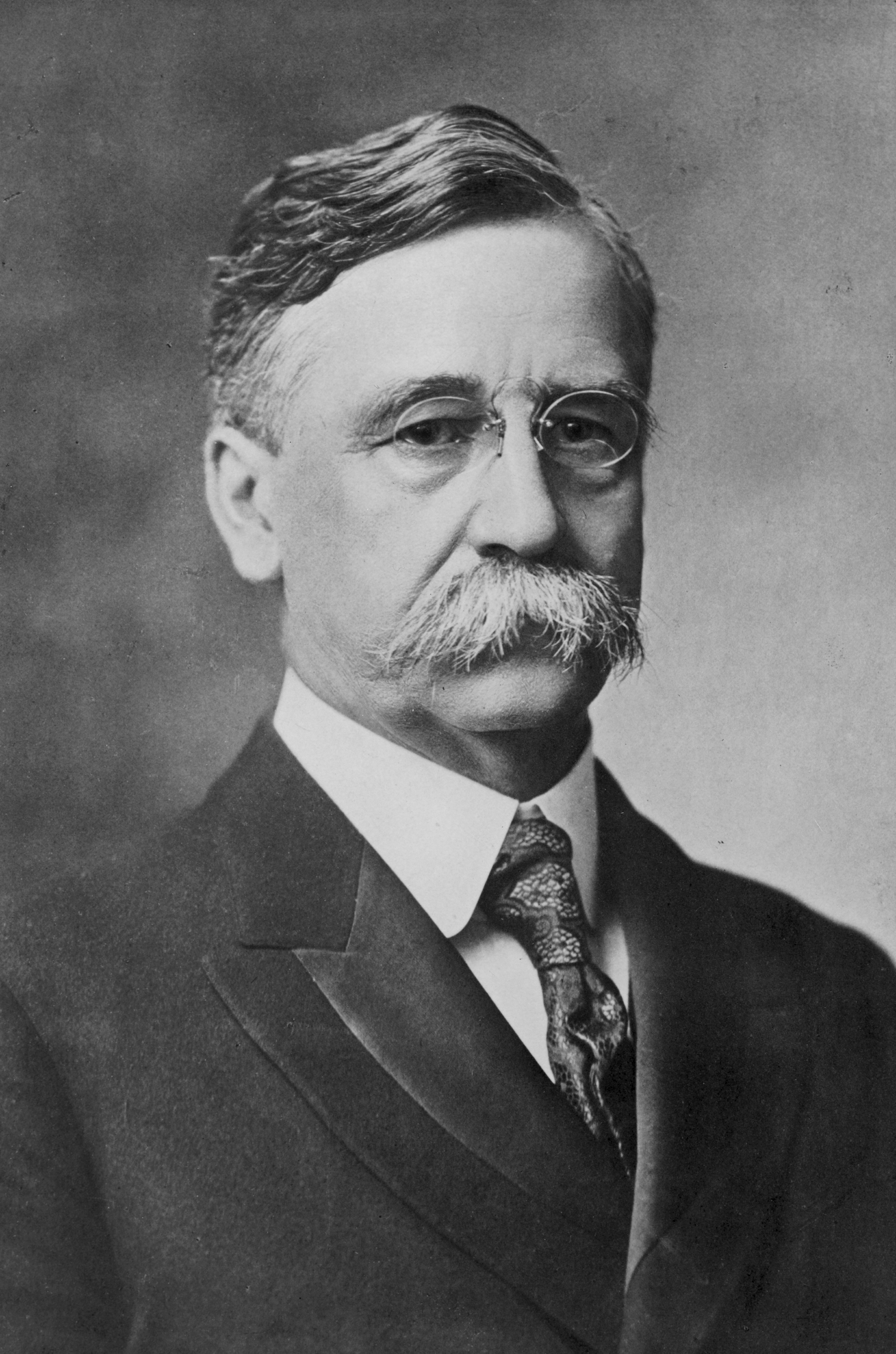
William P. Dillingham, senator from Vermont and chairman of the Commission.

Tension between nativists on one side of the debate (who wanted more restriction of immigration) and those that wished to reform existing rules and immigration systems which promoted the inclusion of "good" immigrants in American society, played a part in the Dillingham Commission's investigation. The Commission was dedicated to taking an empirical approach, with plans to visit Europe, and places most associated with immigration to the United States, which would then be used to inform states across America on which immigration would be most suited for the needs of America, and where. This sort of classification was not new to the Commission, with racial classification remaining popular from the turn of the century, into the 20th and beyond, scientifically informing the nativist rhetoric of the time. Data collected by the Commission did not support racial preconceptions, when taking to account the success of immigrants and their level of assimilation, but recommendations were made, nonetheless.

In the words of the report, "The former (immigrants) were from the most progressive sections of Europe and assimilated quickly... On the other hand, the new immigrants have come from the less progressive countries of Europe and congregated separately from native Americans and the older immigrants to such an extent that assimilation has been slow".

In reaching this conclusion the Commission made distinctions between "old" and more recent "new" immigrants. The report favored "old" immigrants from Northern and Western Europe and opposed "new" immigrants from Eastern and Southern Europe and Asia. The Commission was highly influential due to it being based on "scientific research". However, the Commission did not hold any public hearings or cross-examine witnesses, also choosing not to use "information from census reports, state bureaus of labor and statistics or other agencies". The Commission used its own investigators to present their personal findings. This led investigators to form racial distinctions between different groups of immigrants, as evidenced by way of example by the reports description of Polish immigrants: "In their physical inheritance they resemble the 'Eastern' or 'Slavic' race more than that of North-Western Europe". When referring to Russian immigrants, they described them as "clannish", which shared community through "gangs" as reason for non-assimilation. When considering educational standards applicable to immigrants, only 2 out of 26 questions on an assessment form related to student achievements and failed to take into account economic differences, when reaching conclusions on literacy levels. The Commission's investigation stated that "the ability to speak English is a matter of great importance, for it increases industrial efficiency and assists in the process of assimilation [and shows] the degree of assimilation which has taken place".

== Commission recommendations ==
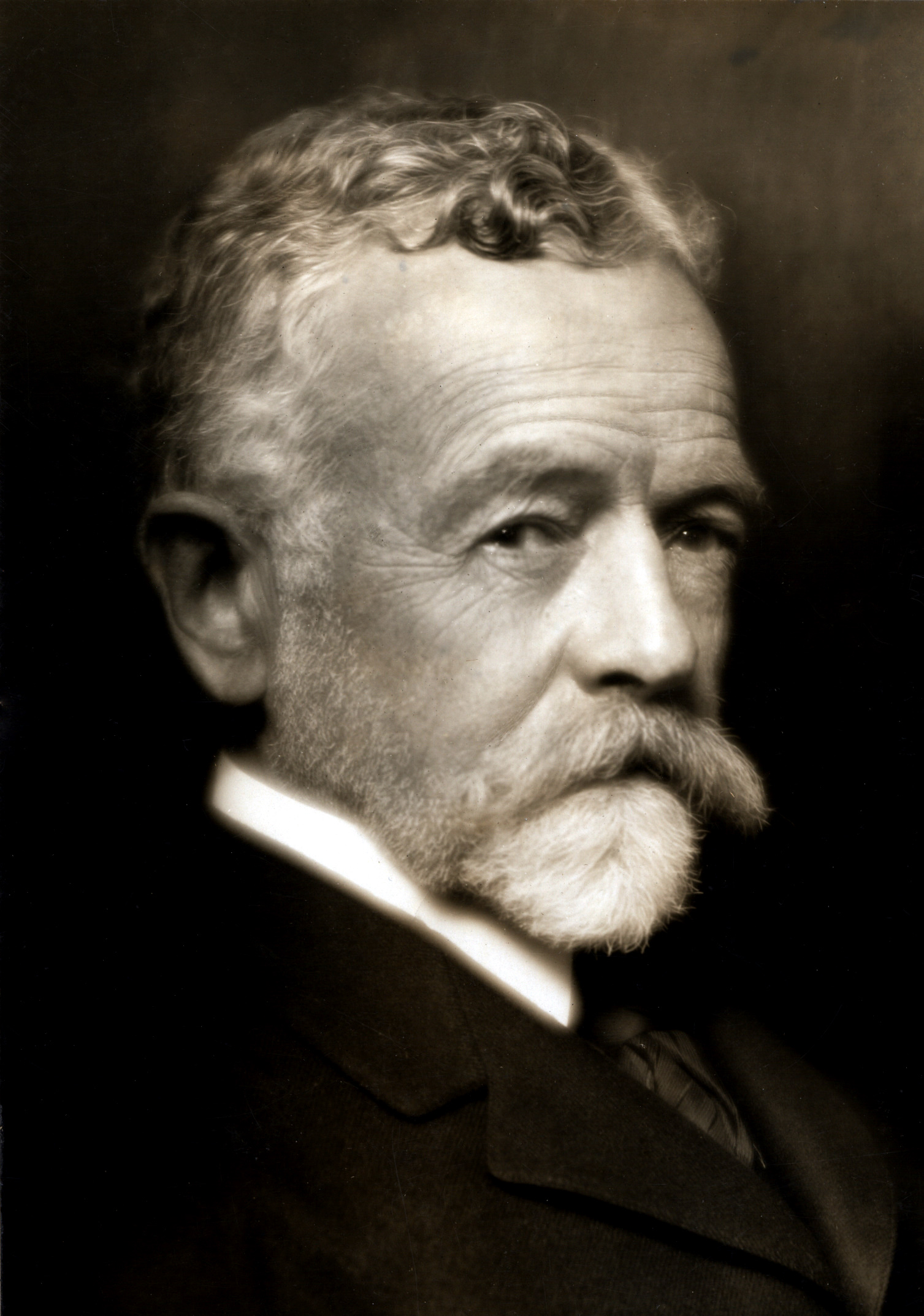
Henry Cabot Lodge, senator from Massachusetts and member of the Commission.

The Commission recommended that any future legislation should follow a set of principles, as follows:

- Immigrants should be considered with quality and quantity as stipulation for the process of assimilation.
- Legislation must consider businesses and the economy, for the well-being of all Americans.
- Health of a country is not shown by total investment, products produced, or trade, unless there is corresponding opportunity to citizens requiring "employment for material, mental and moral development".
- Development of business may be done through a lower standard of living of the wage earners. A slower expansion of industry, allowing for the mixing of incoming labor supply with Americans, is preferred. Rapid expansion can result in laborers of low standard emigrating to the United States. Thus, the standard of wages and conditions of employment would be negatively affected for all workers.

The Commission agreed that:

- Those with convictions for serious crimes within the first 5 years after arrival were to be deported.
- The President should appoint commissioners, who can make arrangements with other countries for copies of police records. Only once documents which prove zero convictions are produced, can a person be admitted to the United States.
- Immigrant seamen to be considered under existing laws.
- An immigrant that "becomes a public charge within three years" of arrival should be deported.
- All previous recommendations should be enforced regularly, enacted by Congress, specifically regarding women being imported for immoral purpose.
- A statute should be enacted which provides the enforcement of law by government officials on vessels carrying passengers at sea, for the protection of the immigrants. Sending officials to the lower decks of ships, disguised as immigrants, should be allowed to continue, under the Bureau.
- Boards of inquiry should be appointed for the purpose of judicial review of appeals and other matters.

It was also agreed that immigrants should be protected from exploitation. States were recommended to push regulations onto immigrant banks and employment was also targeted for regulation, to ensure stability. Immigrants that convinced others to send money overseas, thereby encouraging non-assimilation, were recommended deported. Finally, it was also recommended that information about opportunities for agricultural purposes be made available by states that desire more settlers, in order to attract immigrants that were willing to help with this need.

The Commission also agreed that:

- Necessity to import labor for new industries, to be reviewed by the Secretary of Commerce and Labor, when required and should determine the conditions of such labor.
- Policy that excludes Chinese laborers should be extended to East Indians, with assistance from the British government. Japanese and Korean immigration should continue to be questioned.
- Abundant unskilled labor is damaging, therefore: Satisfactory amounts of labor were recommended excluded from the existing labor force. Furthermore, immigrants that came with no intention of becoming American citizens and plans of residence, were recommended for deportation by the relevant authority. Those to be excluded were described as "least desirable", in reference to habits or personal qualities known to relevant authorities.

The restriction of immigrants was to be determined considering:

- Those unable to read or write.
- Quotas for each race, every year, by percentage.
- Unskilled workers accompanied by wives and families.
- Limits on the number of arrivals at ports.
- Increasing the required amount of money on such persons at the port.
- Increase of the head tax.
- Reducing the head tax of male immigrants that are skilled and with families.

Finally, they determined that reading and writing should be tested through literacy tests, as the best way to eliminate the inclusion of undesired citizens in American society. The Commission recommended that further restrictions be placed on unskilled immigrants with a literacy test to prove they would be of a sufficient educational standard to assimilate into American society. This led to the proposed bills for the new literacy test which were passed by Congress but vetoed first by William Howard Taft in 1913 and subsequently Woodrow Wilson in 1915 (and again in 1917).

== Commission legacy and impact ==
Benton-Cohen described the commission as "one of the first federal agencies to employ women in professional positions", because the Commission employed around 200 women. The Commission came during a period in which women were offered very little opportunity to climb the professional ladder, and this even extended to college-educated women. Women were therefore able to have an impact on 'reform efforts', in regards to immigration, particularly focusing on 'sex trafficking, as well as the economic conditions of immigrant laborers'.

The Commission's recommendations had a substantial impact on American immigration policy. The recommendations eventually led to the introduction of literacy tests (Congress overrode the second veto by Woodrow Wilson in 1917), the Emergency Quota Act of 1921, and the Johnson–Reed Act of 1924. It therefore placed immigration policy firmly in the hands of the federal government, as opposed to the previous state level of enforcement. Immigration from China, Japan, and Korea continued to be restricted leading to the Asiatic Barred Zone Act, which denied entry for immigrants from the Asia–Pacific region. The literacy test and head tax that came with this act were ineffective, preventing just 1,500 immigrants annually, from entering the country between 1918 and 1921. Following these results, a quota system designed to prevent immigration, based on nationality was enacted (Emergency Quota Act), which meant that 3% of the amount of a particular nationality in a 1910 census, were to be permitted entry. Nativists were not satisfied by the results, culminating in the Johnson–Reed Act of 1924, which would limit Europeans to 150,000 a year, zero Japanese immigrants, and 2% of every other nationality's population in the 1890 census. Immigration in America declined much more significantly after this law was enforced, in 1929:

European immigration to the United States, 1921–1930

- 1921: approximately 800,000
- 1924: approximately 700,000
- 1925–1928: approximately 300,000 per annum
- 1930: less than 150,000

== Commission members ==
Senators:

- William P. Dillingham, R-VT, Chairman
- Henry Cabot Lodge, R-MA
- Asbury Latimer, D-SC (1907–1910)
- LeRoy Percy, D-MS (1910–1911)

Representatives:

- Benjamin F. Howell, R-NJ
- William S. Bennet, R-NY
- John L. Burnett, D-AL

Unelected:

- Charles P. Neill, Department of Labor
- Jeremiah W. Jenks, Cornell University
- William R. Wheeler, California Commissioner of Immigration

== Commission reports ==
In 1911, the Dillingham Commission issued a 41-volume report containing statistical overviews and other analyses of topics related to immigrant occupations, living conditions, education, legislation (at the state as well as the federal level), and social and cultural organizations. A planned 42nd volume, an index of the other 41 volumes, was never issued.

- Volumes 1–2: Abstracts of Reports of The Immigration Commission, with Conclusions and Recommendations and Views of the Minority. Vol. 1, Vol. 2
- Volume 3: Frederick Croxton. Statistical Review of Immigration, 1820–1910. Distribution of Immigrants, 1850–1900.
- Volume 4: Emigration Conditions in Europe.
- Volume 5: Daniel Folkmar, assisted by Elnora Folkmar. Dictionary of Races or Peoples
- Volumes 6–7: W. Jett Lauck. Immigrants in Industries: Bituminous Coal Mining. Vol. 6 (pt. 1) Vol. 7 (pt. 2)
- Volumes 8–9: W. Jett Lauck. Immigrants in Industries: Iron and Steel Manufacturing. Vol. 9 part 2
- Volume 10: W. Jett Lauck. Immigrants in Industries: Cotton Goods Manufacturing in the North Atlantic States (pt. 3); Woolen and Worsted Goods Manufacturing (pt. 4)
- Volume 11: Immigrants in Industries: Silk Goods and Manufacturing and Dyeing (pt. 5); Clothing Manufacturing (pt. 6); Collar, Cuff, and Shirt Manufacturing (pt. 7)
- Volume 12: W. Jett Lauck. Immigrants in Industries: Leather Manufacturing (pt. 8); Boot and Shoe Manufacturing (pt. 9); Glove Manufacturing (pt. 10)
- Volume 13: W. Jett Lauck. Immigrants in Industries: Slaughtering and Meat Packing. (pt. 11)
- Volume 14: W. Jett Lauck. Immigrants in Industries: Glass Manufacturing; Agricultural Implement and Vehicle Manufacturing (pt. 12)
- Volume 15: W. Jett Lauck. Immigrants in Industries: Cigar and Tobacco Manufacturing (pt. 14); Furniture Manufacturing (pt 15); Sugar Refining (pt. 16)
- Volume 16: W. Jett Lauck. Immigrants in Industries: Copper Mining and Smelting (pt. 17); Iron Ore Mining (pt. 18); Anthracite Coal Mining (pt. 19); Oil Refining (pt. 20).
- Volumes 1718: W. Jett Lauck. Immigrants in Industries: Diversified Industries. Washington: G.P.O., 1911. Vol. 17 ( vol. 1, pt. 21) Vol 18 (vol. 2, pt. 22)
- Volumes 19–20: W. Jett Lauck. Immigrants in Industries: Summary Report on Immigrants in Manufacturing and Mining. Vol. 19 (vol. 1) Vol. 20 (vol. 2)
- Volume 21–22: Alexander Cance. Immigrants in Industries: Recent Immigrants in Agriculture. Vol. 21 (pt 24, vol. I) Vol. 22 (pt. 24, vol. II)
- Volumes 23–25: Harry A. Millis. Immigrants in Industries: Japanese and Other Immigrant Races in the Pacific Coast and Rocky Mountain States. Vol. 23 (pt 25, vol. I) Vol 24, (pt. 25, vol. II) Vol. 25 (pt 25, vol III)
- Volumes 26–27: Emanuel A. Goldenweiser. Immigrants in Cities: A Study of the Population of Selected Districts in New York, Chicago, Philadelphia, Boston, Cleveland, Buffalo, and Milwaukee. Vol. 26 Vol. 27
- Volume 28: Joseph Hill. Occupations of the First and Second Generations of Immigrants in the United States; Fecundity of Immigrant Women
- Volumes 29–33: The Children of Immigrants in Schools. Vol. 29 Vol. 30 Vol. 31 Vol. 32
- Volumes 34–35: Immigrants as Charity Seekers. Vol. 34 Vol. 35
- Volume 36: Leslie Hayford. Immigration and Crime
- Volume 37: Steerage Conditions, Importation and Harboring of Women for Immoral Purposes, Immigrant Homes and Aid Societies, Immigrant Banks
- Volume 38: Franz Boas. Changes in Bodily Form of Descendants of Immigrants.
- Volume 39: Immigration Legislation
- Volume 40: The Immigration Situation in other Countries: Canada, Australia, New Zealand, Argentina, Brazil
- Volume 41: Statements and Recommendations Submitted by Societies and Organizations Interested in the Subject of Immigration

== See also ==
- California Joint Immigration Committee
- Nativism
- Progressive Era
- Scientific racism
