= 1914 United States Senate election in Vermont =

United States Senate election in Vermont, 1914
- November 3, 1914
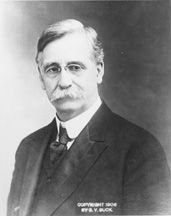

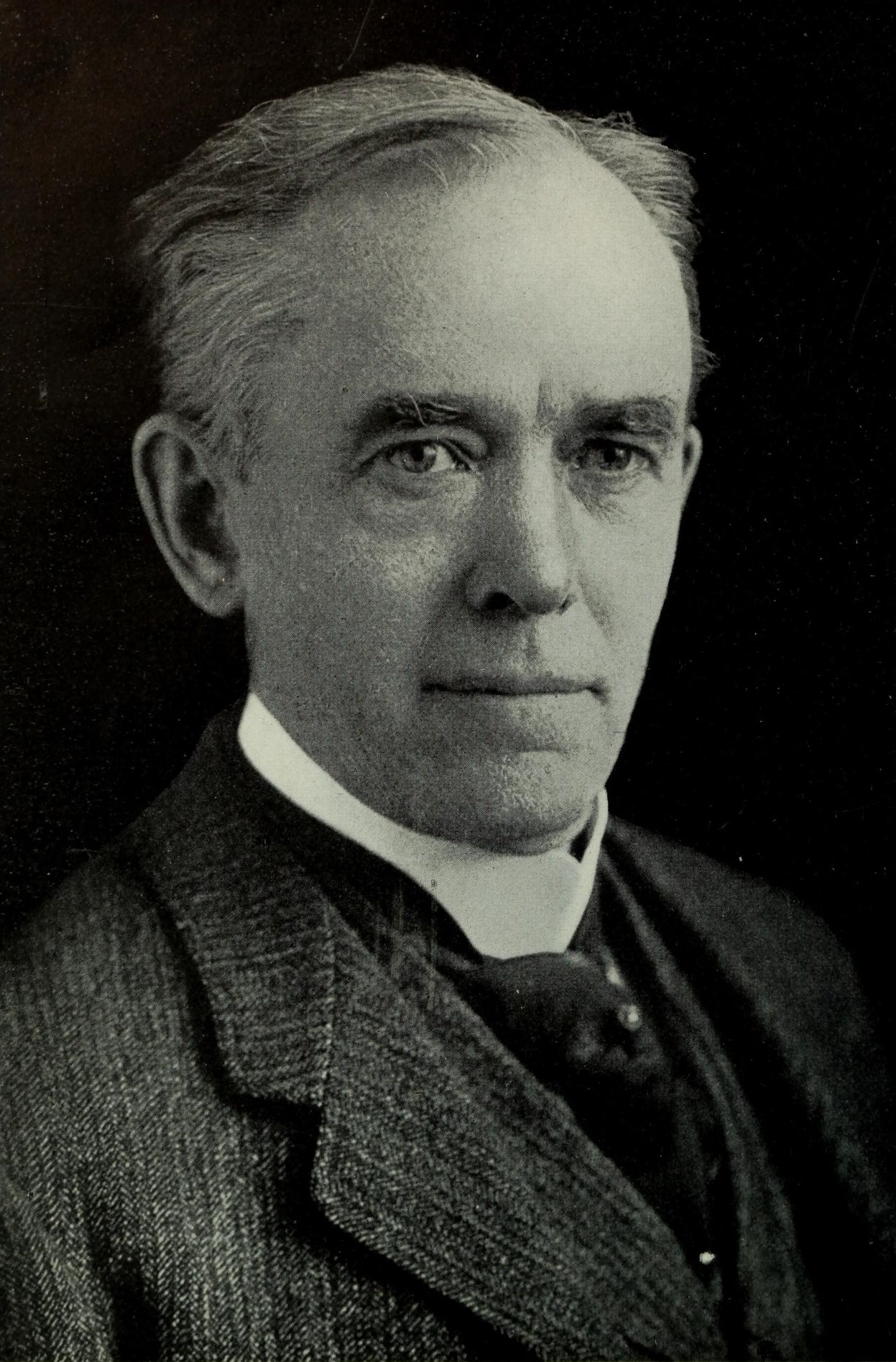
Nominee	William P. Dillingham	Charles A. Prouty
Party	Republican	Progressive
Alliance		Parties: Democratic; Prohibition; Ind. Republican; Independent
Popular vote	35,137	26,766
Percentage	56.04%	42.69%
- County results Dillingham: 50–60% 60–70% Prouty: 50–60%
U.S. senator before election
William P. Dillingham
Republican
Elected U.S. Senator
William P. Dillingham
Republican

The 1914 United States Senate election in Vermont took place on November 3, 1914. Incumbent Republican William P. Dillingham successfully ran for re-election to another term in the United States Senate, defeating Charles A. Prouty. This was the first United States Senate direct election to take place in Vermont following the ratification of the Seventeenth Amendment to the United States Constitution.

== General election ==
=== Candidates ===
- James Canfield (Socialist)
- William P. Dillingham, incumbent Senator since 1900 (Republican)
- Charles A. Prouty, member and former chair of the Interstate Commerce Commission and former State Representative from Newport City (Progressive, Democratic, Prohibition, Nonpartisan and Independent Republican)

=== Results ===
1914 United States Senate election in Vermont
Party	Candidate	Votes	%	±%
Republican	William P. Dillingham (inc.)	35,137	56.04%	
Democratic	Charles A. Prouty	16,306	26.01%	
Progressive	Charles A. Prouty	7,339	11.71%	
Nonpartisan	Charles A. Prouty	1,592	2.54%	
Prohibition	Charles A. Prouty	1,526	2.43%	
Republican	Charles A. Prouty	3	0.00%	
Total	Charles A. Prouty	26,766	42.69%	
Socialist	James Canfield	772	1.23%	
N/A	Other	20	0.03%	
Total votes		62,695	100.00%	
