= Hoyt Henry Wheeler =

American judge

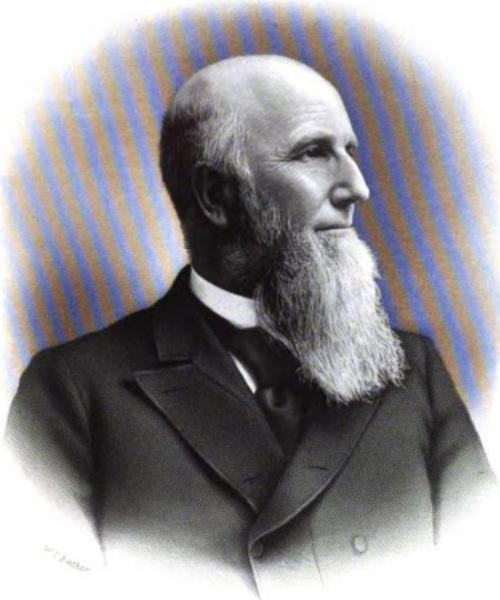

Judge of the United States District Court for the District of Vermont
- In office March 16, 1877 – September 30, 1906
- Appointed by: Rutherford B. Hayes
- Preceded by: David Allen Smalley
- Succeeded by: James Loren Martin

Associate Justice of the Vermont Supreme Court
- In office 1869–1877
- Preceded by: John Prout
- Succeeded by: Walter C. Dunton

Member of the Vermont Senate from Windham County
- In office 1868–1869 Serving with David Goodell
- Preceded by: Daniel Kellogg; Homer Goodhue
- Succeeded by: David Goodell; Vacant (After Hoyt's resignation)

Member of the Vermont House of Representatives from Jamaica
- In office 1867–1868
- Preceded by: Abijah Muzzy
- Succeeded by: Joel Holton

Personal details
- Born: Hoyt Henry Wheeler; August 30, 1833 Chesterfield, New Hampshire, US
- Died: November 19, 1906 (aged 73) Brattleboro, Vermont, US
- Resting place: Morningside Cemetery; Brattleboro, Vermont, US
- Party: Republican
- Spouse: Minnie L. Maclay (m. 1861-1904, her death)
- Profession: Attorney

Hoyt Henry Wheeler (August 30, 1833 – November 19, 1906) was an associate justice of the Vermont Supreme Court and later a United States district judge of the United States District Court for the District of Vermont.

== Education and career ==
Wheeler was born on August 30, 1833, in Chesterfield, New Hampshire, a son of John Wheeler and Roxana (Hall) Wheeler. He was raised and educated in Chesterfield and Newfane, Vermont, including attendance at the Chesterfield Academy, where he later taught. He also taught at schools in Dummerston, Vermont, Newfane, Townshend, Vermont and Westminster, Vermont. Wheeler began to study law while teaching, and learned under the tutelage of attorneys Charles K. Field, Jonathan Dorr Bradley and George Bradley Kellogg. He was admitted to the bar in 1859, and practiced in Jamaica from 1859 to 1867, first in partnership with John E. Butler, then as senior partner with Lavant M. Reed. A Republican, he was a member of the Vermont House of Representatives in 1867. He was a member of the Vermont Senate from 1868 to 1869. He was an associate justice of the Vermont Supreme Court from 1869 to 1877, succeeding Justice John Prout.

== Federal judicial service ==
Wheeler was nominated by President Rutherford B. Hayes on March 15, 1877, to a seat on the United States District Court for the District of Vermont vacated by Judge David Allen Smalley. According to contemporary accounts, Wheeler had not sought the appointment, but received it because he had made a favorable impression on Hayes when Hayes visited Newfane. (Hayes's family was originally from nearby Dummerston.) He was confirmed by the United States Senate on March 16, 1877, and received his commission the same day. He retired in October 1906, following the confirmation of James Loren Martin as his successor.

== Death and burial ==
Wheeler died in Brattleboro on November 19, 1906. He was buried at Morningside Cemetery in Brattleboro.

== Family ==
In 1861, Wheeler married Minnie L. Maclay of Lockport, New York. They had no children, but raised as their own a nephew, John Knowlton, the son of Mrs. Wheeler's sister Elizabeth and her husband Benjamin L. Knowlton.

== Honors ==
In 1886, Wheeler received the honorary degree of LL.D. from the University of Vermont.

== Sources ==
=== Books ===
- Cabot, Mary Rogers (1921). Annals of Brattleboro, 1681-1895. Vol. 1. Brattleboro, VT: E. L. Hildreth & Company. pp. 961– – via Ancestry.com.
- Carleton, Hiram (1903). Genealogical and Family History of the State of Vermont. Vol. I. New York, NY: Lewis Publishing Company. pp. 76–77. ISBN 9780806347943.
- Harman, Henry A. (October 25, 1892). A Memorial Sketch of John Prout: Published in the Annual Meeting Proceedings of the Vermont Bar Association. Montpelier, VT: Argus and Patriot Book and Job Printing. pp. 63–67.
- Williams, Charles Richard (1914). The Life of Rutherford Birchard Hayes, Nineteenth President of the United States. Vol. I. Boston, MA: Houghton Mifflin Company. p. 6. ISBN 9781623761431.

=== Newspapers ===
- "Nominations Confirmed: Hoyt H. Wheeler". Rutland Daily Herald. Rutland, VT. March 17, 1877. p. 3 – via Newspapers.com.
- "Personal: Honorary Degrees". Vermont Chronicle. Bellows Falls, VT. July 9, 1886. p. 8 – via Newspapers.com.
- "Judge Wheeler's Retirement". Burlington Free Press. Burlington, VT. October 15, 1906. p. 4 – via Newspapers.com.
- "Judge Wheeler's Funeral". St. Albans Messenger. St. Albans, VT. November 20, 1906. p. 1 – via Newspapers.com.
- "Mr. Martin's Appointment". Brattleboro Reformer. Brattleboro, VT. October 26, 1906. p. 6 – via Newspapers.com.
- "Judge H. H. Wheeler; His Death on Monday Evening of this Week". Vermont Phoenix. Brattleboro, VT. November 23, 1906. p. 5 – via Newspapers.com.

Legal offices
Preceded by John Prout	Associate Justice of the Vermont Supreme Court; 1869–1877	Succeeded by Walter C. Dunton
Preceded by David Allen Smalley	Judge of the United States District Court for the District of Vermont; 1877–1906	Succeeded by James Loren Martin
