= Edith Kellogg Dunton =

American novelist

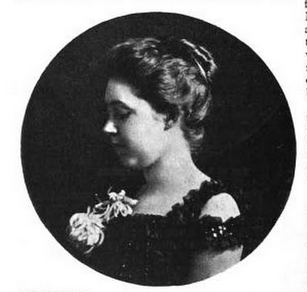
- Born: December 28, 1875; Rutland, Vermont, U.S.
- Died: December 31, 1944 (aged 69); Middletown, Connecticut, U.S.
- Resting place: Evergreen Cemetery, Rutland, Vermont
- Occupation: Writer
- Relatives: Walter C. Dunton (father)
- Writing career
- Pen name: Margaret Warde

Edith Kellogg Dunton (December 28, 1875 – December 31, 1944) was the author of a popular series of early 20th century juvenile novels called the "Betty Wales" series, which she wrote under the pseudonym Margaret Warde.

Dunton was born in Rutland, Vermont, the daughter of Walter C. Dunton and Miriam E. Barrett. She graduated from Smith College in 1897. The first Betty Wales volume was released in 1904 and published by the Penn Publishing Company. Dunton's identity as the author of the series was not leaked until late 1907, at which time she was also writing under her own name as a critic for The Dial magazine in Chicago.

The popularity of the Betty Wales series, which followed the story of the title character from her freshman year at the fictional Harding College through beyond graduation, led to the introduction of a line of "Betty Wales Dresses" in 1915, where each purchase entitled the buyer to a free book from the series. Dunton followed up the Wales series (though a last volume was added in 1917) with the "Nancy Lee" series.

Dunton died in late 1944 and was buried at the Evergreen Cemetery in Rutland.

== Selected works ==
- Betty Wales, Freshman, a Story for Girls (1904)
- Betty Wales, Sophomore (1905)
- Betty Wales, Junior (1906)
- Betty Wales, Senior (1907)
- Betty Wales, B.A. (1908)
- Betty Wales & Co. (1909)
- Betty Wales on the Campus (1910)
- Betty Wales Decides (1911)
- Betty Wales' Girls and Mr. Kidd (1912) (also a play)
- Betty Wales, Business Woman (1917)
- Nancy Lee (1912)
- Nancy Lee's Spring Term (1913)
- Nancy Lee's Lookout (1915)
- Nancy Lee's Namesake (1918)
- Is Your Name Smith? (1921 play) (as Edith K. Dunton)
