= Wheelock G. Veazey =

American judge

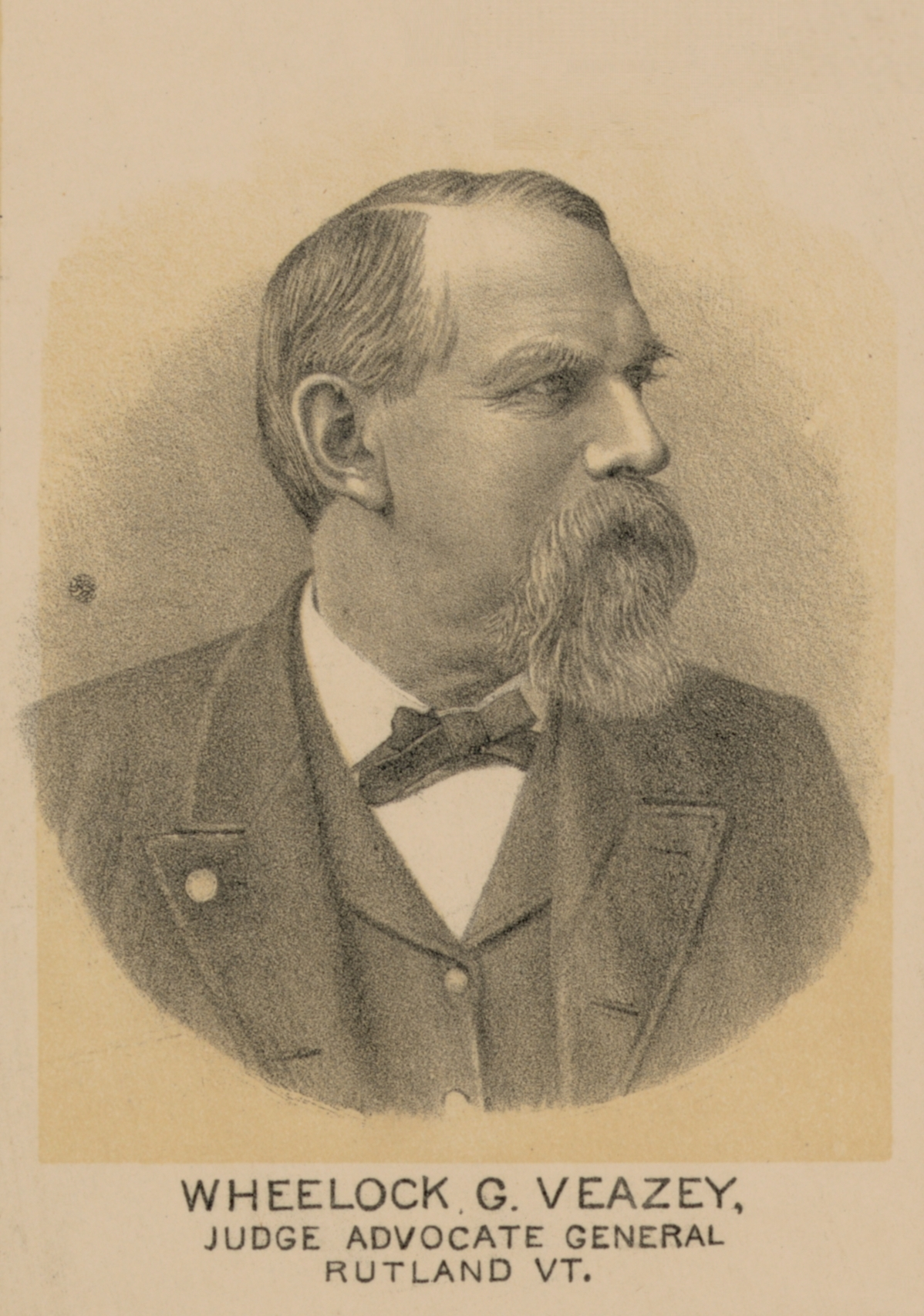
- Veazey as Judge Advocate General of the Grand Army of the Republic

Commander-in-Chief of the Grand Army of the Republic
- In office 1890–1891
- Preceded by: Russell A. Alger
- Succeeded by: John Palmer

Member of the Interstate Commerce Commission
- In office 1889–1896
- Preceded by: Aldace F. Walker
- Succeeded by: Charles A. Prouty

Associate Justice of the Vermont Supreme Court
- In office 1879–1889
- Preceded by: Walter C. Dunton
- Succeeded by: Loveland Munson

Personal details
- Born: Wheelock Graves Veazey; December 5, 1835 Brentwood, New Hampshire, US
- Died: March 22, 1898 (aged 62) Washington, D.C., US
- Resting place: Arlington National Cemetery
- Education: Dartmouth College
- Profession: Lawyer; Judge

Military service
- Allegiance: United States of America
- Branch/service: United States Army; Union Army
- Years of service: 1861–1863
- Rank: Colonel
- Commands: 16th Vermont Infantry
- Battles/wars: American Civil War
- Awards: Medal of Honor

Wheelock Graves Veazey (December 5, 1835 – March 22, 1898) was an American attorney, judge, and government official. Veazey served as a justice of the Vermont Supreme Court, and as a member of the Interstate Commerce Commission. During the American Civil War he received the United States military's highest decoration for bravery, the Medal of Honor.

== Early life and career ==
Veazey was born in Brentwood, New Hampshire on December 5, 1835, to Jonathan and Annie (Stevens) Veazey. After being educated in the local public schools, he attended Phillips Exeter Academy, and then Dartmouth College, graduating in 1859. He studied law with Gilman Marston, graduated from Albany Law School, and was admitted to the Vermont Bar in December 1860. Veazey then began the practice of law in Springfield, Vermont.

When the Civil War began, Veazey enlisted as a private in Company A of the 3rd Vermont Infantry. He was made a captain in that regiment in May 1861, and in August was further promoted to major and then lieutenant colonel. On June 22, 1861, he married Julia Beard, daughter of a New Hampshire newspaper editor. In the latter half of 1862 he returned to Vermont to raise a new regiment. On September 27 he was promoted to colonel and elected commander of the newly formed 16th Vermont Infantry.

He led this unit at the Battle of Gettysburg on July 3, 1863, and 28 years later, on September 8, 1891, he received the Medal of Honor for his actions during that engagement. His official citation reads: "Rapidly assembled his regiment and charged the enemy's flank; charged front under heavy fire, and charged and destroyed a Confederate brigade, all this with new troops in their first battle." He finished his service as chief of staff to General William Farrar Smith In 1863, he left the army, and returned to Vermont.

== Political career ==
On his return from the war, Veazey resumed the practice of law in Rutland, Vermont. In 1864, he was elected to the position of Reporter of Decisions for the Vermont Supreme Court, and held that post by repeated re-election until 1872 In 1872, he was elected to the Vermont State Senate, and the following year was appointed a Registrar in Bankruptcy. In 1876, he served as a delegate-at-large to the Republican National Convention. In 1879, the Legislature elected him as a judge of the Vermont Supreme Court, succeeding his law partner Walter C. Dunton, and he was re-elected to that post every two years until he became a member of the I.C.C. In 1880, he became a trustee of Dartmouth College, and held that position for many years.

Colonel Veazey was active in the Grand Army of the Republic, serving as post commander of the Rutland post, then as department commander for the Vermont G.A.R. from 1873 to 1875. In 1877 and 1888, he served as judge advocate general on the staff of the commander-in-chief of the G.A.R., and finally as commander-in-chief himself from 1890 to 1891. He was also a member of the Military Order of the Loyal Legion of the United States. In addition, Veazey was active in the Reunion Society of Vermont Officers, and served as its president from 1874 to 1875.

== Interstate Commerce Commission ==
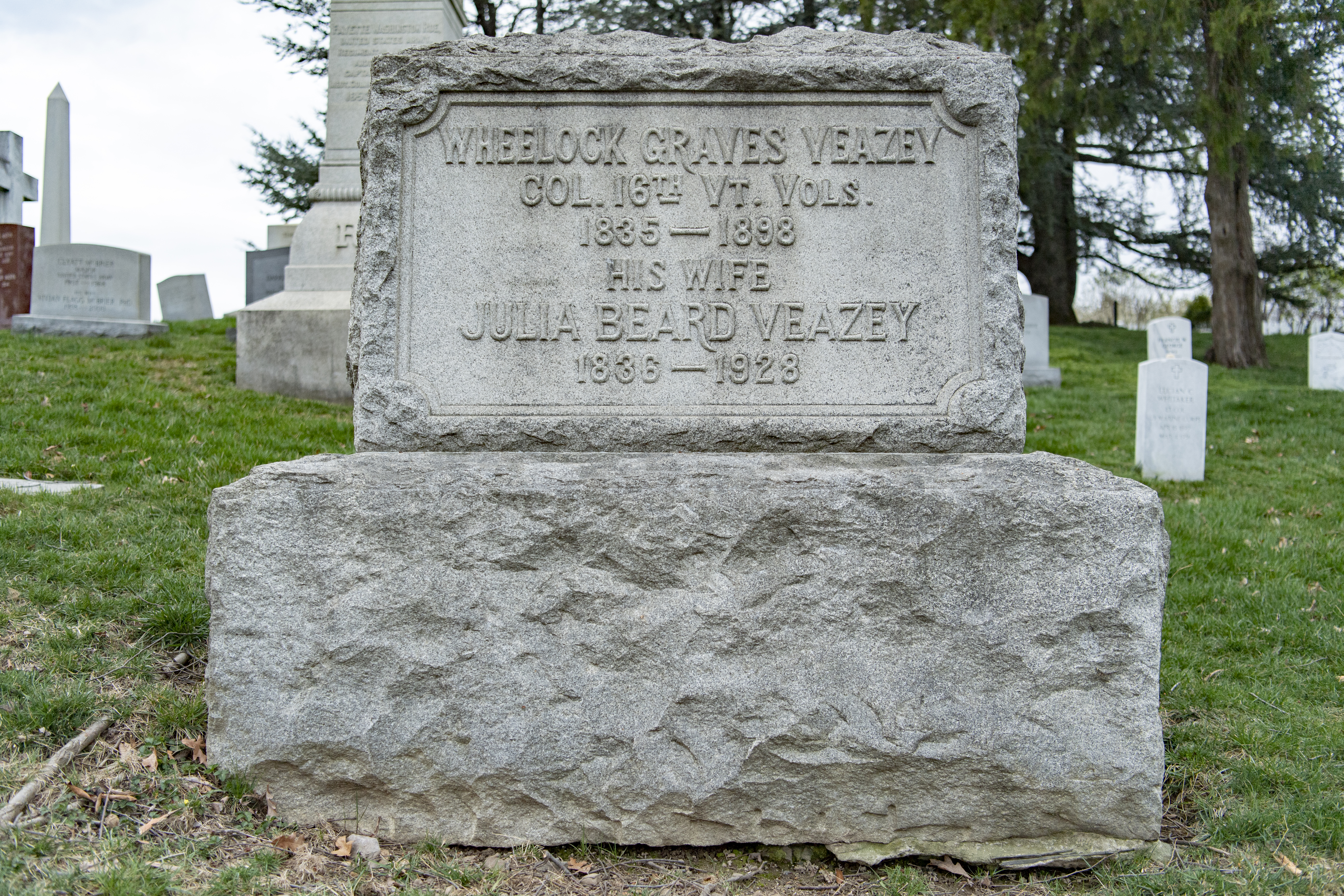
Grave at Arlington National Cemetery

On August 31, 1889, Veazey was appointed by President Benjamin Harrison as a member of the Interstate Commerce Commission, filling the unexpired term of Aldace F. Walker, who had resigned a few months before the end of his term. As Congress was not then in session, Veazey received a recess appointment, taking the oath of office on September 10, 1889. The term to which Veazey was appointed expired on December 31; Harrison sent a nomination for a full six-year term to the Senate. The Senate confirmed Veazey on December 20, three days after receiving the nomination.

President Grover Cleveland reappointed Veazey to the I.C.C. for a second six-year term on December 19, 1895, and the Senate confirmed him the same day. He served until resigning on December 20, 1896, and was succeeded by Charles A. Prouty. He remained in Washington, and died there on March 22, 1898. Veazey is buried at Arlington National Cemetery, Section 2, Grave 1026.

== See also ==
- List of Medal of Honor recipients for the Battle of Gettysburg
- List of American Civil War Medal of Honor recipients: T–Z
