= Lyman W. Redington =

American attorney and politician (1849–1925)

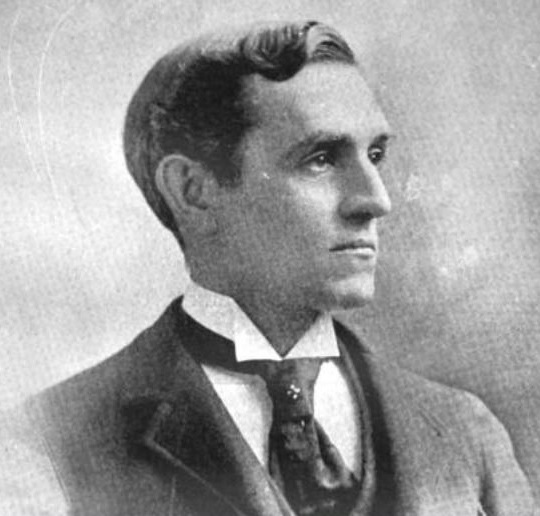
- From Volume II of 1897's History of the Bench and Bar of New York

Member of the New York State Assembly
- In office January 1, 1898 – December 31, 1899
- Preceded by: Philip W. Reinhard Jr.
- Succeeded by: John J. Scanlon
- Constituency: New York County's 34th district

Postmaster of Rutland Village, Vermont
- In office July 17, 1885 – July 2, 1889
- Preceded by: Albert H. Tuttle
- Succeeded by: Fred A. Field

Judge of the Rutland Village Municipal Court
- In office March 22, 1884 – July 20, 1885
- Preceded by: Martin G. Evarts
- Succeeded by: Albert Landon

Member of the Vermont House of Representatives
- In office October 2, 1878 – October 6, 1880
- Preceded by: John A. Sheldon
- Succeeded by: John B. Page
- Constituency: Rutland Town

Personal details
- Born: March 14, 1849 Waddington, New York, U.S.
- Died: October 18, 1925 (aged 76) Flushing, Queens, New York, U.S.
- Resting place: Fresh Pond Crematory and Columbarium, Middle Village, Queens, New York, U.S.
- Party: Democratic
- Spouse(s): Catherine Russell Merrill (m. 1875); Frances Sutton (m. 1900)
- Children: 3
- Education: Yale College (attended); Columbia Law School (attended)
- Profession: Attorney

Lyman Williams Redington (Note: Redington's last name appears in some news articles as "Reddington".) (March 14, 1849 – October 18, 1925) was an American attorney and politician who was active in Vermont and New York. A Democrat, he served in the Vermont House of Representatives from 1880 to 1882, and the New York State Assembly from 1898 to 1900. In addition, as a Democrat during the more than 100 years when Republicans won every statewide election and contest for federal office, Redington was also an unsuccessful candidate for Vermont's 1st district seat in the United States House of Representatives in 1882, and governor of Vermont in 1884.

A native of Waddington, New York, Redington was educated at Vermont's Castleton Seminary and Massachusetts' Williston Academy. After attending Yale College and Columbia Law School, Redington studied law in the Milwaukee office of U.S. Senator Matthew H. Carpenter. After attaining admission to the bar, he practiced briefly in Wisconsin and Iowa before settling in Rutland Village, Vermont. Active in politics as a Democrat, Redington served in the Vermont House of Representatives from 1878 to 1880, and Rutland's municipal judge from 1884 to 1885. In 1884, he was the unsuccessful Democratic nominee for governor of Vermont. In 1885, he was appointed postmaster of Rutland Village, and he served until 1889.

Redington resigned as Rutland's postmaster because he relocated to New York City, where he continued to practice law and took part in politics as a member of the Tammany Hall Democratic organization. From 1898 to 1899, he served in the New York State Assembly. After breaking with Tammany Hall, Redington remained active in politics, usually in support of Democratic candidates, but occasionally as a supporter of Republicans who opposed corruption and supported the gold standard. He later moved from Manhattan to Queens, where he continued to practice law until his death. Redington was interred at Fresh Pond Crematory and Columbarium in Middle Village, Queens.

== Early life ==
Lyman Williams Redington was born in Waddington, New York on March 14, 1849, the son of George Redington and Loraine Williams (Sheldon) Redington, who died in childbirth. George Redington was active in the lumber and real estate businesses, served as a local judge, and was a member of the New York State Assembly. Lyman Redington was raised and educated in Waddington and in Rutland Town, Vermont, then attended Castleton Seminary in Vermont and Williston Academy in Massachusetts. He completed Williston's Classical curriculum in 1866, then began attendance at Yale College as a member of the class of 1870. He left Yale in 1867 because difficulty with his eyesight left him unable to study. After completing a course of treatment in 1868, he returned to Williston, where he graduated from the English curriculum in 1869. During his second course at Williston, he was a co-founding editor of the Salmagundi yearbook.

Redington moved to New York City in 1869 to attend Columbia Law School, where he remained until 1870. He then moved to Milwaukee, Wisconsin, where he studied law in the office of U.S. Senator Matthew H. Carpenter. He was admitted to the bar of Wisconsin in 1871, then traveled extensively in Europe.

== Early career ==
As a partner in the firm of Goodwin and Redington, Redington practiced in Milwaukee from 1871, after which he spent a short time practicing law in Council Bluffs, Iowa. In July 1873, he moved to the village of Rutland in Rutland Town, where he continued to practice law. In partnership with Albert H. Tuttle, from July to December 1873 Redington also held a one-third ownership share of the Rutland Herald newspaper, for which he prepared frequent editorials on politics and current events. In January 1875, Redington formed the Baker and Redington law firm with partner Joel C. Baker.

Redington was active in politics as a Democrat. Despite holding this affiliation during the period of more than 100 years when Republicans won every statewide election, Redington served in several party positions and attained electoral success at the local level. In 1876, he won election as Rutland's grand juror (prosecutor in the municipal court), and he served for five years. Later in 1876, he was an unsuccessful candidate for the Vermont House of Representatives. In April 1877, Redington was an unsuccessful candidate in the first election for judge of Rutland's newly created municipal court. He represented Rutland in the Vermont House from 1878 to 1880, and was a delegate to the 1880 Democratic National Convention. In 1879, Redington formed a new law partnership, this time with Fred M. Butler. In August 1880, Redington purchased Rutland's Review-Inquirer newspaper, which he intended to publish as a Democratic organ.

In June 1881, Redington was the commencement speaker at Williston Academy. In June 1882, he was chairman of Vermont's state Democratic convention. In 1882, he was also an unsuccessful candidate for the United States House of Representatives. In March 1884, Redington was appointed to fill a vacancy as judge of Rutland's municipal court, and he won election to a full term in April 1884, then was reelected in March 1885. He was a delegate to the 1884 Democratic National Convention, and was also the unsuccessful Democratic nominee in the 1884 gubernatorial election.

== Continued career ==
As a supporter of Grover Cleveland's successful 1884 presidential campaign, Redington was rewarded in July 1885 with appointment as Rutland's postmaster, and he resigned his judgeship. He served as postmaster until May 1889, when he resigned in anticipation of relocating to New York City. Throughout his career, Redington gave frequent lectures and speeches, with a series of presentations on his travels in Europe being the most frequently delivered in lecture halls, churches, and other venues. A talented musician and actor, Redington frequently appeared in amateur performances in the Rutland area. He was also involved in several fraternal organizations, including the Sons of the Revolution, Knights of Pythias and Freemasons.

While serving as postmaster, Redington continued to practice law. In addition, he was involved in several business ventures, including serving on the board of directors and as president of the New England Fire Insurance Company. He was also an officer of Vermont's lodge of the Knights of Honor, a benefit society that operated in the late 1800s and early 1900s. He continued his efforts on behalf of the Democratic Party, including campaigning throughout Vermont and upstate New York during the 1888 United States presidential election and holding leadership positions in the National Association of Democratic Clubs.

In May 1889, Redington formed a partnership with Alexander U. Mayer, a Manhattan attorney. He relocated from Rutland to New York City in mid-1889, where he practiced law with the firm of Redington & Mayer. In early 1891, he formed a new partnership with attorney George P. Webster, and Webster & Redington continued to practice in New York City. As a New Yorker, Redington continued his affiliation with the Democratic Party by becoming active in the Tammany Hall organization. In addition to practicing law, he was an organizer of the National Homestead Company, an investment and home mortgage firm, of which he was president.

In 1894, Redington was the unsuccessful Democratic nominee for New York State Assembly in the 27th district of New York County. In 1896, he was the party's unsuccessful nominee in the 34th district of New York County. In 1897, Redington won election to the Assembly from New York County's 34th district. He was reelected in 1898, and served from January 1, 1898, to December 31, 1899. His support for a bill that would have formed a private utility company for Astoria, Queens caused the leaders of Tammany Hall to request his resignation from the organization.

== Later career ==
In May 1898, Redington was appointed to thee board of directors of a newly-formed business venture, the Alaska Sunrise Gold Mining Company. As a result of his falling out with Tammany Hall, he was not renominated for the Assembly in 1899, and he subsequently attempted to form a competing organization, the Tecumseh Club. In March 1900, business reverses caused Redington to file for bankruptcy, declaring assets of $700, and debts of slightly more than $39,000. During the 1900 United States presidential election, he announced that Democratic nominee William Jennings Bryan's support for bimetallism with respect to U.S. currency, the major economic issue of the time, had caused him to endorse incumbent Republican William McKinley, a supporter of the gold standard. In October 1901, Redington was a delegate to the Democratic nominating convention for New York City municipal offices, and made the nominating speech on behalf of Charles V. Fornes for president of the board of aldermen. During the rest of the campaign, he made speeches on behalf of Seth Low, the mayoral candidate of Republicans and anti-Tammany Democrats.

In the summer of 1904, Redington made campaign speeches for Democrats at several locations in Vermont, including Bristol and Middlebury. During the 1904 United States presidential election, Redington supported Democratic nominee Alton B. Parker and made speeches on his behalf in New York and Vermont. In 1906, Redington was a supporter of Charles Evans Hughes, the Republican nominee in the for governor, and made campaign speeches on his behalf. From 1908 to 1910, he served as an assistant corporation counsel for the borough of Manhattan. In March 1909, Redington joined George Schuster, mechanic for the American team in the 1908 New York to Paris Race, as Schuster traveled the state by car to plan the New York portion of the route for a scheduled New York City to Seattle race.

In August 1911, Redington was the victim of a home robbery; news accounts indicated that the thief or thieves knew enough about tableware to steal only items of solid silver, which were worth about $100 (about $3,100 in 2024). In the 1912 United States Presidential Election, Redington backed Woodrow Wilson and was a campaign speaker at events in New York City and on Long Island. Redington continued to remain active as an attorney and was residing in and practicing law in Flushing, Queens when he died at his home on October 18, 1925. He was interred at Fresh Pond Crematory and Columbarium in Middle Village, Queens.

== Family ==
On October 6, 1875, Redington married Catherine Russell Merrill. She died in January 1900, and they were the parents of three children, Mary Patterson (b. 1876), Thomas Gregory (b. 1880), and Paul Merrill (b. 1886). On October 6, 1900, he married Frances De Montoya. In 1931, she married Raymond Barnes Carroll of Plainfield, New Jersey.

== Notes ==
Party political offices
Preceded by George E. Eaton	Democratic nominee for Governor of Vermont; 1884	Succeeded by Stephen C. Shurtleff
Preceded by Jean J. Randall	Democratic nominee for U.S. Representative from Vermont's 1st congressional district 1882	Succeeded by George H. Simmons
