= Loyal C. Kellogg =

American judge (1816–1871)

Loyal C. Kellog
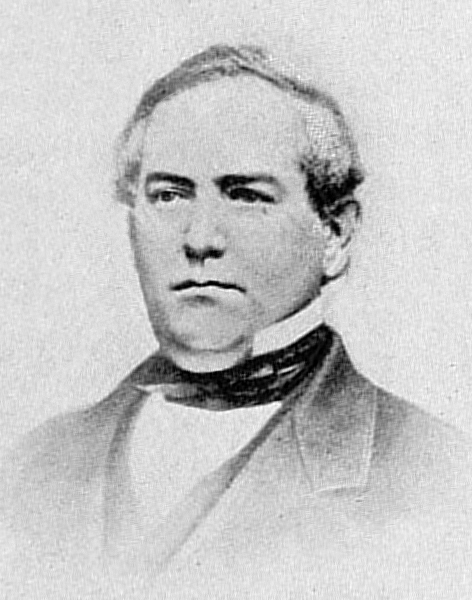
- From 1894's Men of Vermont Illustrated

Associate Justice of the Vermont Supreme Court
- In office 1859–1867
- Preceded by: Milo Lyman Bennett
- Succeeded by: John Prout

Member of the Vermont House of Representatives from Benson
- In office 1870–1872
- Preceded by: Henry R. Jones
- Succeeded by: Henry E. Strong
- In office 1859–1860
- Preceded by: Franklin W. Walker
- Succeeded by: John Dickinson
- In office 1850–1852
- Preceded by: Isaac Dickinson
- Succeeded by: James H. Gleason
- In office 1847–1848
- Preceded by: Philo Wilcox
- Succeeded by: Isaac Dickinson

Personal details
- Born: February 13, 1816 Benson, Vermont, U.S.
- Died: November 26, 1871 (aged 55) Benson, Vermont, U.S.
- Resting place: Old Benson Cemetery, Benson, Vermont
- Party: Whig (before 1854); Republican (from 1854)
- Education: Amherst College
- Profession: Attorney

Loyal C. Kellogg (February 13, 1816 – November 26, 1871) was a Vermont attorney, politician and judge. He served as an associate justice of the Vermont Supreme Court from 1860 to 1867.

== Biography ==
Loyal Case Kellogg was born in Benson, Vermont on February 13, 1816, the son of John Azor Kellogg (1786-1852) and Harriot (Nash) Kellogg. He was educated in Benson, and graduated from Amherst College in 1836. He studied law with attorney Phineas Smith of Rutland, and was admitted to the bar in 1839.

He practiced law in Benson from 1839 to 1859 when he was elected an associate justice of the Vermont Supreme Court. He served through 1867, being reelected each year by the legislature. Although reelected to the court in 1867, he declined in a letter November 4, 1867 to Governor John B. Page, citing failing health. He was succeeded on the court by John Prout.

Kellogg represented Benson in the Vermont House of Representatives in 1847, 1850, 1851, 1859, 1870, and 1871, serving on the Committee of Banks (1847), the Committee of Banks and Revision (1851), and the Committee on the Judiciary (1859). He did not serve on any standing committees in 1871, due to failing health, but did serve on the Joint Committee on the Library. He was a delegate from Benson to the Constitutional Conventions of 1847, 1857, and 1870 and was president of the 1857 convention. He also served as a director of the Bank of Rutland and the National Bank of Rutland.

In his later years, Kellogg devoted much of his time and effort to historical studies. He was a vice president of the Vermont Historical Society, and president of the Rutland County Historical Society. Among his written works was the history of Benson which appeared in Abby Maria Hemenway's The Vermont Historical Gazetteer.

== Death and burial ==
Kellogg died in Benson on November 26, 1871. He was buried at Old Benson Cemetery in Benson. Kellogg never married, and had no children.

== Honors ==
In 1869, Amherst College conferred on Kellogg the honorary degree of LL.D.
