= Walter C. Dunton =

American judge (1830–1890)

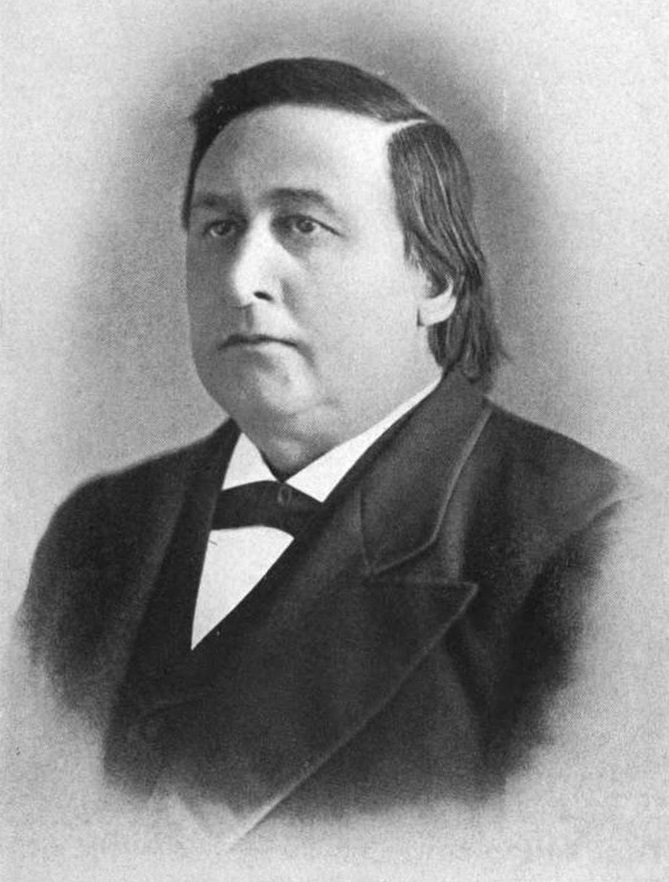
- From 1901's Report of the Proceedings of the Annual Meeting of the Vermont Bar Association

Member of the Vermont Senate from Rutland County
- In office 1880–1882 Serving with Royal D. King, Orel Cook, Emmett R. Pember
- Preceded by: Horace H. Dyer, Ebenezer J. Ormsbee, Levi Rice, Charles A. Rann
- Succeeded by: Aldace F. Walker, Walter E. Howard, Charles D. Childs, Charles S. Colburn

President of the Vermont Bar Association
- In office 1880–1881
- Preceded by: Luke P. Poland
- Succeeded by: Daniel Roberts

Associate Justice of the Vermont Supreme Court
- In office 1877–1879
- Preceded by: Hoyt H. Wheeler
- Succeeded by: Wheelock G. Veazey

Probate Judge of the Rutland District of Vermont
- In office 1865–1877
- Preceded by: Ambrose L. Brown
- Succeeded by: Charles S. Colburn

Personal details
- Born: November 29, 1830 Bristol, Vermont, U.S.
- Died: April 23, 1890 (aged 59) Rutland City, Vermont, U.S.
- Resting place: Evergreen Cemetery, Rutland, Vermont, U.S.
- Party: Republican
- Spouse: Miriam E. Barrett (m. 1862)
- Children: 5 (including Edith Kellogg Dunton)
- Education: Middlebury College
- Occupation: Attorney

Military service
- Allegiance: United States (Union)
- Branch/service: Union Army
- Years of service: 1862–1863
- Rank: Captain
- Unit: 14th Vermont Infantry
- Commands: Company F, 14th Vermont Infantry
- Battles/wars: American Civil War

Walter C. Dunton (November 29, 1830 – April 23, 1890) was a Vermont attorney, businessman, politician, and judge. In addition to serving in the Vermont State Senate, Dunton was a justice of the Vermont Supreme Court from 1877 to 1879.

== Early life ==
Walter Chipman Dunton was born in Bristol, Vermont on November 29, 1830. He was educated at Franklin Academy, and graduated from Middlebury College in 1857, where he was a charter member of the Middlebury chapter of the Delta Kappa Epsilon fraternity. After graduation, Dunton studied law with the firm of Dillingham and Durant of Waterbury, and then with Linsley and Prout of Rutland. He was admitted to the bar in 1858, moved to Manhattan, Kansas Territory, and established a practice in Riley County, Kansas. A Republican, Dunton served in the Territorial Legislature in 1861.

== Military career ==
In 1862, Dunton enlisted for the American Civil War, was commissioned as a captain in the Union Army, and was appointed commander of Company F, 14th Vermont Infantry. Part of the 2nd Vermont Brigade, the 14th Vermont was a 10-month regiment, and was active from October 1862 to August 1863; it took part in the defense of Washington, DC, and played a key role in breaking up Pickett's Charge during the Battle of Gettysburg.

After the war, Vermont Grand Army of the Republic Post 110 in Bristol was named in his honor.

== Later career ==
After leaving the Army, Dunton practiced law in Rutland as the partner of John Prout and Wheelock G. Veazey. In 1865 he was elected probate judge of Rutland County, and he served until 1877. In 1870 he was a delegate to the state constitutional convention. Dunton served as a trustee of Middlebury College from 1870 to 1890.

In April 1877, Dunton was appointed a justice of the Vermont Supreme Court, replacing Hoyt H. Wheeler, who resigned to become Judge of the United States District Court for the District of Vermont. He served until 1879, when he resigned and returned to practicing law; he was succeeded on the court by his law partner Wheelock Veazey.

Dunton served in the Vermont State Senate from 1880 to 1882, and served as chairman of the Judiciary Committee. He served as president of the Vermont Bar Association from 1880 to 1881, and from 1888 to 1889 he was a law professor at Iowa State University. Dunton was also active in several businesses; in addition to serving as the attorney for Rutland's Baxter National Bank, he was also a member of the bank's board of directors.

== Death and burial ==
Dunton died in Rutland on April 23, 1890, and was buried at Evergreen Cemetery in Rutland.

== Family ==
In October 1862, Dunton married Miriam E. Barrett of Rutland. They were the parents of one son and four daughters: Agnes Ellen; Edith Kellogg; Walter Barrett; Miriam Buttrick; and Mary.

== Sources ==
=== Books ===
- Harman, Henry H. (1901). Proceedings of the Vermont Bar Association: Memorial Paper on Walter C. Dunton. Montpelier, VT: Argus and Patriot Printing House.
- Ullery, Jacob G. (1894). Men of Vermont Illustrated. Brattleboro, VT: Transcript Publishing Company. p. 188.

=== Newspapers ===
- "Death Notice, Hon. Walter C. Dunton". The Burlington Free Press. Burlington, VT. April 25, 1890 – via Newspapers.com.
- "Funeral of Judge Dunton". Rutland Herald. Rutland, VT. April 26, 1890 – via Newspapers.com.

=== Internet ===
- "Grand Army of the Republic Department of Vermont Posts". Vermont in the Civil War. Tom Ledoux. Archived from the original on August 17, 2004.

Legal offices
Preceded by Hoyt Henry Wheeler	Associate Justice of the Vermont Supreme Court; 1877-1879	Succeeded by Wheelock G. Veazey
