= Ebenezer J. Ormsbee =

American politician (1834–1924)

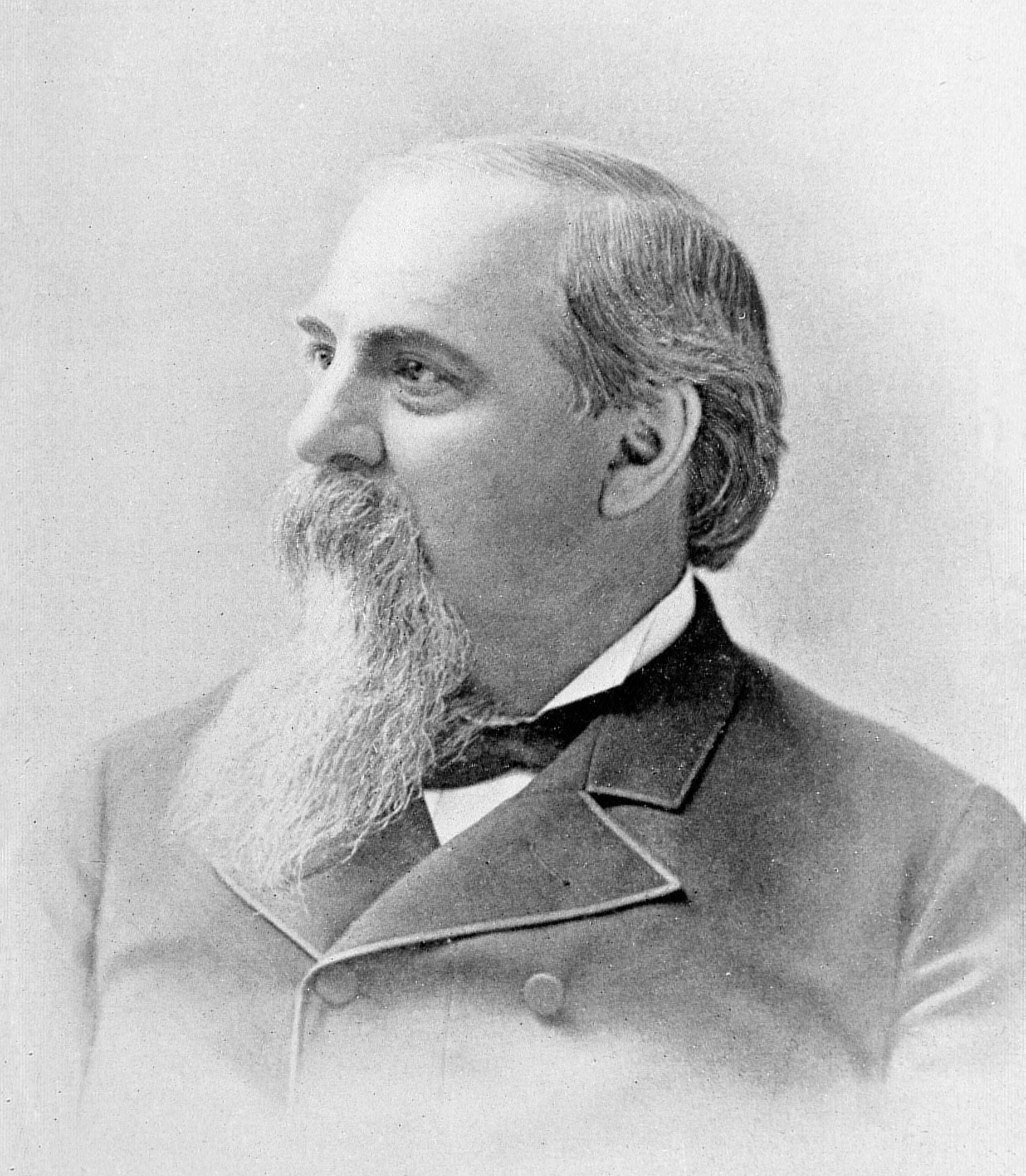

41st Governor of Vermont
- In office October 7, 1886 – October 4, 1888
- Governor: Levi K. Fuller
- Preceded by: Samuel E. Pingree
- Succeeded by: William P. Dillingham

35th Lieutenant Governor of Vermont
- In office October 2, 1884 – October 7, 1886
- Governor: Samuel E. Pingree
- Preceded by: Samuel E. Pingree
- Succeeded by: Levi K. Fuller

Member of the Vermont Senate
- In office 1878–1880 Serving with Horace H. Dwyer, Levi Rice, Charles A. Rann
- Preceded by: Ner P. Simons, Samuel Williams, Henry F. Lothrop, Charles W. Brigham
- Succeeded by: Walter C. Dunton, Royal D. King, Orel Cook, Emmett R. Pember
- Constituency: Rutland County

Member of the Vermont House of Representatives
- In office 1872–1874
- Preceded by: Zachariah Clark
- Succeeded by: Stephen L. Goodell
- Constituency: Brandon

State's Attorney of Rutland County, Vermont
- In office 1871–1873
- Preceded by: Horace G. Wood
- Succeeded by: Martin G. Everts

Personal details
- Born: June 8, 1834 Shoreham, Vermont, U.S.
- Died: April 3, 1924 (aged 89) Brandon, Vermont, U.S.
- Resting place: Pine Hill Cemetery, Brandon, Vermont, U.S.
- Party: Republican
- Spouses: Jennie L. Briggs (m. 1862; died 1866) Frances Wadhams (m. 1867)
- Profession: Attorney
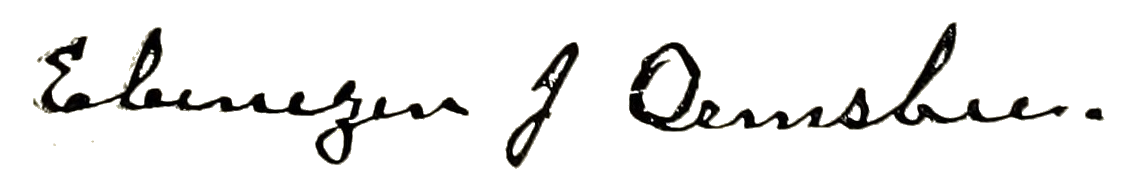
- Signature

Military service
- Allegiance: United States (Union)
- Service: Union Army
- Years of service: 1861–1863
- Rank: Captain
- Unit: Company G, 1st Vermont Infantry
- Commands: Company G, 12th Vermont Infantry
- Wars: American Civil War

Ebenezer Jolls Ormsbee (June 8, 1834 – April 3, 1924) was an American attorney and politician from Vermont. A Republican, he served as lieutenant governor from 1884 to 1886, and governor from 1886 to 1888.

A native of Shoreham, Vermont, Ormsbee attended academies in Brandon and South Woodstock, then studied law at a Brandon legal firm. After attaining admission to the bar, he enlisted in the Union Army for the American Civil War. Ormsbee served with the 1st Vermont Infantry in 1861, then joined the 12th Vermont Infantry as commander of its Company G. After leaving the army in 1863, he practiced law in Brandon.

A Republican, Ormsbee served as Rutland County State's Attorney from 1871 to 1873. He represented Brandon in the Vermont House of Representatives from 1872 to 1874 and Rutland County in the Vermont Senate from 1878 to 1880. In 1884, he was elected lieutenant governor, and he served until 1886. He was the successful Republican nominee for governor in 1886 and served until 1888. During his governorship, he oversaw the initial efforts of the newly organized state railroad commission and board of health.

After leaving office, Ormsbee practiced law in Brandon and served on two federal commissions, one to negotiate a compromise with the Paiutes in Nevada to relinquish part of their Pyramid Lake Indian Reservation, and one to negotiate competing land claims in Samoa with commissioners from Germany and Great Britain. He remained active in politics, including supporting the presidential campaigns of William McKinley and Theodore Roosevelt. He practiced law until a stroke at age 80 caused him to retire, and he was the longtime president of the Brandon National Bank. Ormsbee died in Brandon on April 3, 1924. He was buried at Pine Hill Cemetery in Brandon.

== Early life ==
Ebenezer Jolls Ormsbee was born in Shoreham, Vermont on June 8, 1834, the son of John Mason and Polly (Willson) Ormsbee. He worked on the family farm and attended the local schools of Shoreham, then attended academies in Brandon and South Woodstock. Ormsbee taught school while studying law at the Brandon firm of Anson A. Nicholson and Ebenezer N. Briggs. He was admitted to the bar of Rutland County in 1861.

== Military career ==
In April 1861, Ormsbee enlisted for the American Civil War, joining a company called "Allen Grays" in April 1861. This unit was subsequently accepted for Union Army service as Company G, 1st Vermont Infantry. On April 25, 1861, Ormsbee was elected his company's second lieutenant, and he served with the unit in Virginia during its entire three-month term. In September 1862, he joined Company G, 12th Vermont Infantry as commander with the rank of captain. This regiment enlisted for nine months, and Ormsbee remained with it for its entire service, including the Battle of Gettysburg. The 12th Vermont returned home and was mustered out in July 1863.

== Start of career ==
After Ormsbee was mustered out, he practiced law in Brandon as Nicholson's partner, and later as Ebenezer Briggs's partner, then the partner of Briggs's son George. A Republican, he was a member of the party's state committee and served as a U.S. internal revenue assessor from 1868 to 1872. From 1871 to 1873, he served as State's Attorney for Rutland County. Ormsbee represented Brandon in the Vermont House of Representatives from 1872 to 1874, and Rutland County in the Vermont Senate from 1878 to 1880. During his House term, Ormsbee served on the judiciary committee. During his senate term, Ormsbee was chairman of the committee on the state asylum and a member of the committee on state and federal relations. He served a trustee of the Vermont Reform School from 1880 to 1884.

In 1884, Ormsbee was the Republican nominee for lieutenant governor. With the Republican Party dominant in the years following the Civil War, he easily won the general election. In 1886, he was elected governor. Ormsbee served the single two-year term permitted by the Republican Party's "Mountain Rule", and his administration included appointment of a commission to propose revisions to the state's education laws and overseeing the initial work of Vermont's new railroad commission and board of health.

In 1887, President Grover Cleveland proposed to return to the former Confederate states battle flags that had been captured by Union troops during the Civil War. The Grand Army of the Republic led the opposition to Cleveland's plan, and the G.A.R's Vermont Department passed resolutions condemning Cleveland's proposal. Ormsbee forwarded the resolutions to Cleveland, declaring they had "my unqualified and warmest approval" and "you may rest assured that they contain the sentiments of Vermont on this subject." Cleveland rescinded his executive order, but in 1905 shifting sentiment led to unopposed passage of a federal law requiring the return of the flags.

== Later career ==
At the end of 1891 Ormsbee was appointed by President Benjamin Harrison to serve on a commission to treat with the Paiute Indians at the Pyramid Lake Indian Reservation, in Nevada, to get the tribe to relinquish a claim to part of their reservation. Later that year, he was appointed as U.S. Land commissioner in Samoa, where he negotiated with British and German commissioners to adjust claims to millions of acres of Samoan land. Ormsbee completed his work in May 1893, returned to the United States, and resumed his law practice in Brandon.

In September 1896, Ormsbee joined a number of Vermont luminaries in a train trip to William McKinley's hometown of Canton, Ohio to demonstrate their support for his presidential campaign. In September 1901, he was president of the Reunion Society of Vermont Officers and presided over the organization's annual banquet, at which Vice President Theodore Roosevelt was the featured speaker. Roosevelt became president a week later, and in late August and early September 1902 returned to Vermont to spend several days campaigning for Republican candidates in that year's elections; Ormsbee presided over welcoming ceremonies during Roosevelt's September 1 stop in Brandon. Ormsbee also presided over the July 1913 dedication of a monument to Stephen A. Douglas, a native of Brandon.

== Retirement and death ==
He was a Freemason, and a longtime comrade of Grand Army of the Republic Post No. 18, which was named for his brother Charles James Ormsbee; C. J. Ormsbee was killed in action while serving with the 5th Vermont Infantry during the May 1864 Battle of the Wilderness. Several universities presented Ormsbee with honorary degrees, including a Master of Arts from Middlebury College in 1874, a Master of Arts from Dartmouth College in 1884, and an LL.D. from Norwich University in 1893.

Ormsbee was president of the Brandon Free Public Library, president of the Brandon Cemetery Association, and member of the prudential committee of the Brandon graded and high school for over 27 years. He was long affiliated with the Brandon National Bank, and served for many years as its president. Ormsbee practiced law until age 80, when a stroke caused him to retire though he continued to serve as the bank's president. He died in Brandon on April 3, 1924. Ormsbee was buried at Pine Hill Cemetery in Brandon.

== Family ==
In 1862, Orsmbee married Jennie L. Briggs, the daughter of his law partner Ebenezer N. Briggs. She died in 1866, and in 1867 he married Frances Davenport of Wadhams Mills, New York.

== See also ==
- Vermont in the Civil War

Party political offices
Preceded by Samuel E. Pingree	Republican nominee for Lieutenant Governor of Vermont; 1884	Succeeded by Levi K. Fuller
Preceded by Samuel E. Pingree	Republican nominee for Governor of Vermont; 1886	Succeeded by William P. Dillingham
Political offices
Preceded by Samuel E. Pingree	Lieutenant Governor of Vermont; 1884–1886	Succeeded by Levi K. Fuller
Preceded by Samuel E. Pingree	Governor of Vermont; 1886–1888	Succeeded by William P. Dillingham
