= William P. Dillingham =

American politician (1843–1923)

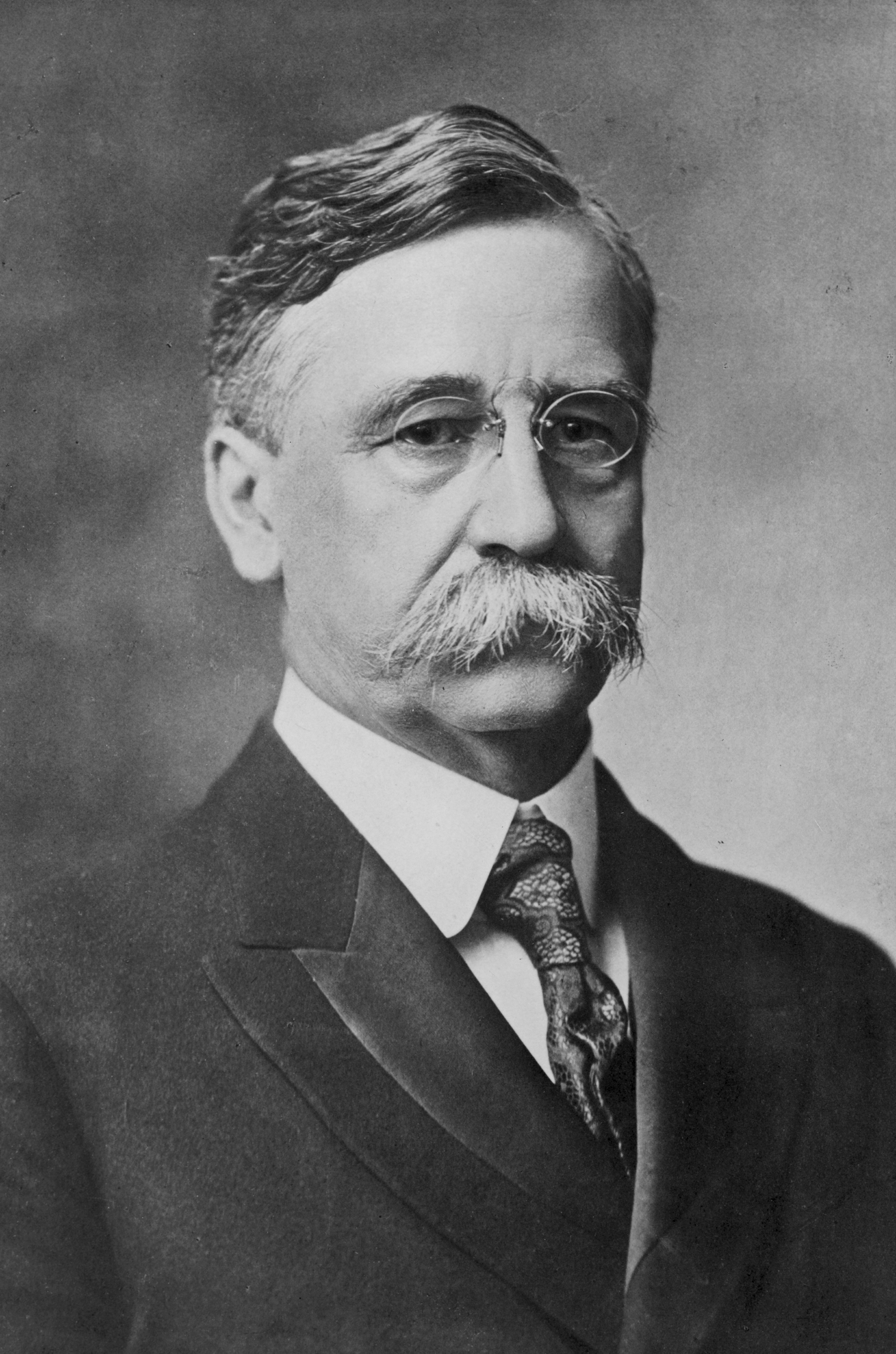
- Dillingham, c. 1904

United States Senator from Vermont
- In office October 18, 1900 – July 12, 1923
- Preceded by: Jonathan Ross
- Succeeded by: Porter H. Dale

42nd Governor of Vermont
- In office October 4, 1888 – October 2, 1890
- Lieutenant: Urban A. Woodbury
- Preceded by: Ebenezer J. Ormsbee
- Succeeded by: Carroll S. Page

Vermont Commissioner of Taxes
- In office December 1, 1882 – October 3, 1888
- Preceded by: None (position created)
- Succeeded by: James Loren Martin

Member of the Vermont Senate from Washington County
- In office 1878–1882 Serving with Albert Dwinell
- Preceded by: Eliakim Persons Walton; Ira Richardson
- Succeeded by: Willard S. Martin; Edwin K. Jones

Member of the Vermont House of Representatives from Waterbury
- In office 1884–1886
- Preceded by: George W. Randall
- Succeeded by: George E. Moody
- In office 1876–1878
- Preceded by: John B. Parker
- Succeeded by: Leander H. Haines

Personal details
- Born: William Paul Dillingham; December 12, 1843 Waterbury, Vermont
- Died: July 12, 1923 (aged 79) Montpelier, Vermont
- Party: Republican
- Spouse: Mary E. Shipman (1846 -- 1893)
- Relations: Paul Dillingham (father); Matthew H. Carpenter (brother in law)
- Profession: Lawyer

William Paul Dillingham (December 12, 1843 – July 12, 1923) was an American attorney and politician from Vermont. A Republican and the son of congressman and governor Paul Dillingham, William P. Dillingham served as governor from 1888 to 1890 and a United States senator from 1900 until his death.

Dillingham was born in Waterbury, Vermont in 1843, and attended schools in Vermont and New Hampshire. He studied law with his brother in law, Matthew Hale Carpenter, attained admission to the bar, and practiced in Waterbury and Montpelier.

Groomed for a political career from an early age, Dillingham was the Secretary of Civil and Military Affairs (chief assistant to the governor) during his father's term and also for Asahel Peck, State's Attorney of Washington County. Dillingham was a member of the Vermont House of Representatives and Vermont State Senate. He was elected governor in 1888 and served a two-year term.

In 1900, Dillingham won election to the United States Senate, replacing Jonathan Ross, who had been appointed as a temporary replacement following the death of incumbent Justin Smith Morrill. Dillingham served in the Senate until his death, and was chairman of several committees during his tenure. As head of a commission that studied immigration, he argued that Eastern and Southern European immigrants posed a threat to the country's stability and growth, and that immigration from those areas should be curbed in the future.

== Early life ==
The son of Governor Paul Dillingham and Julia Partridge (Carpenter) Dillingham, William P. Dillingham was born on December 12, 1843 in Waterbury, Vermont. He attended public schools, Newbury Seminary in Montpelier, Vermont and Kimball Union Academy in Meriden, New Hampshire. In 1866 he served as Secretary of Civil and Military Affairs (chief assistant) during his father's governorship. He also studied law with his brother in law Matthew H. Carpenter and was admitted to the bar in 1867.

== Public service ==
Dillingham practiced law in Waterbury. A Republican, he served as Washington County State's Attorney from 1872 to 1876. From 1874 to 1876, he was Secretary of Civil and Military Affairs (chief assistant) for Governor Asahel Peck. In 1876, Dillingham was elected to the Vermont House of Representatives. From 1878 to 1882, he served in the Vermont State Senate. Dillingham served as Vermont's Commissioner of Taxes from 1882 to 1888, and was a member of the Vermont House again beginning in 1884.

In 1888, Dillingham was elected the 42nd governor of Vermont. He served one two-year term available under the Mountain Rule, afterwards returning to the practice of law. He practiced in Montpelier with Hiram A. Huse and Fred A. Howland. Howland was Dillingham's nephew and studied law with Dillingham to qualify for admission to the bar.

Dillingham was elected to the United States Senate in 1900, replacing temporary appointee Jonathan Ross and completing the term of Justin Smith Morrill, who had died in office. Dillingham was reelected in 1903, 1909, 1914, and in 1920, serving until his death. His 1914 election was Vermont's first after the passage of the Seventeenth Amendment to the United States Constitution.

During his Senate career Dillingham was Chairman of these committees: Transportation Routes to the Seaboard (Fifty-seventh Congress); Immigration (Fifty-eighth through Sixty-first Congresses); Privileges and Elections (Sixty-second, Sixty-sixth, and Sixty-seventh Congresses); and Establishing the University of the United States (Sixty-third through Sixty-fifth Congresses).

Dillingham achieved prominence as the leading legislative spokesperson for restricting immigration during the Progressive Era. From 1907 to 1911, he chaired (concurrently with Senate duties) the United States Immigration Commission, also called the Dillingham Commission, which concluded that immigration from Eastern and Southern Europe posed a serious threat to American society and culture and should be greatly reduced in the future. In 1903, Dillingham chaired a Senate subcommittee which investigated conditions in Alaska after the Klondike Gold Rush. During the trip, a new courthouse established near Kanakanak, a village on the Nushagak River, was named in honor of the chairman and the surrounding community later adopted the name Dillingham, Alaska. While the subcommittee traveled extensively throughout Alaska, Dillingham never set foot in the Bristol Bay salmon fishing community which still bears his name.

== Business and civic endeavors ==
Dillingham's business interests included serving as president of the Waterbury Savings Bank and a member of the National Life Insurance Company board of directors.

He was active in the Methodist Church and the President of the Board of Trustees of the Montpelier Seminary (originally the Vermont Methodist Seminary). He was a member of the University of Vermont Board of Trustees as well. Dillingham joined the Sons of the American Revolution, and served as the president of the Vermont SAR organization.

== Death and burial ==
Dillingham died in Montpelier on July 12, 1923. He was buried in Waterbury's Hope Cemetery.

== Awards and honors ==
Dillingham received these honorary degrees, Master of Arts from the University of Vermont in Burlington (1886); LL.D., Norwich University in Northfield, Vermont (1893); LL.D. Middlebury College (1906). A street (Dillingham Avenue) is named after the senator in Manchester, Vermont. It was named after him by Charles F. Orvis (1856-1915), owner of the Orvis Company.

== Family ==
Dillingham lived at 7 West Street in Montpelier, Vermont while serving in the Senate. His home was owned by Vermont College for more than 50 years and served as a dormitory in addition to office space. Known as Dillingham Hall when it was part of the college, the building is again a private residence.

On December 24, 1874, William P. Dillingham married Mary Ellen Shipman (November 7, 1846—April 25, 1893). They had a son, Paul Shipman Dillingham (October 24, 1878—March, 1972).

== See also ==
- List of members of the United States Congress who died in office (1900–1949)

Party political offices
Preceded by Ebenezer J. Ormsbee	Republican nominee for Governor of Vermont; 1888	Succeeded by Carroll S. Page
First	Republican nominee for U.S. Senator from Vermont (Class 3); 1914, 1920	Succeeded by Porter H. Dale
Political offices
Preceded by Ebenezer J. Ormsbee	Governor of Vermont; 1888–1890	Succeeded by Carroll S. Page
U.S. Senate
Preceded by Jonathan Ross	United States Senator (Class 3) from Vermont; 1900-1923	Succeeded by Porter H. Dale
