= John Prout (politician) =

American judge (1815–1890)

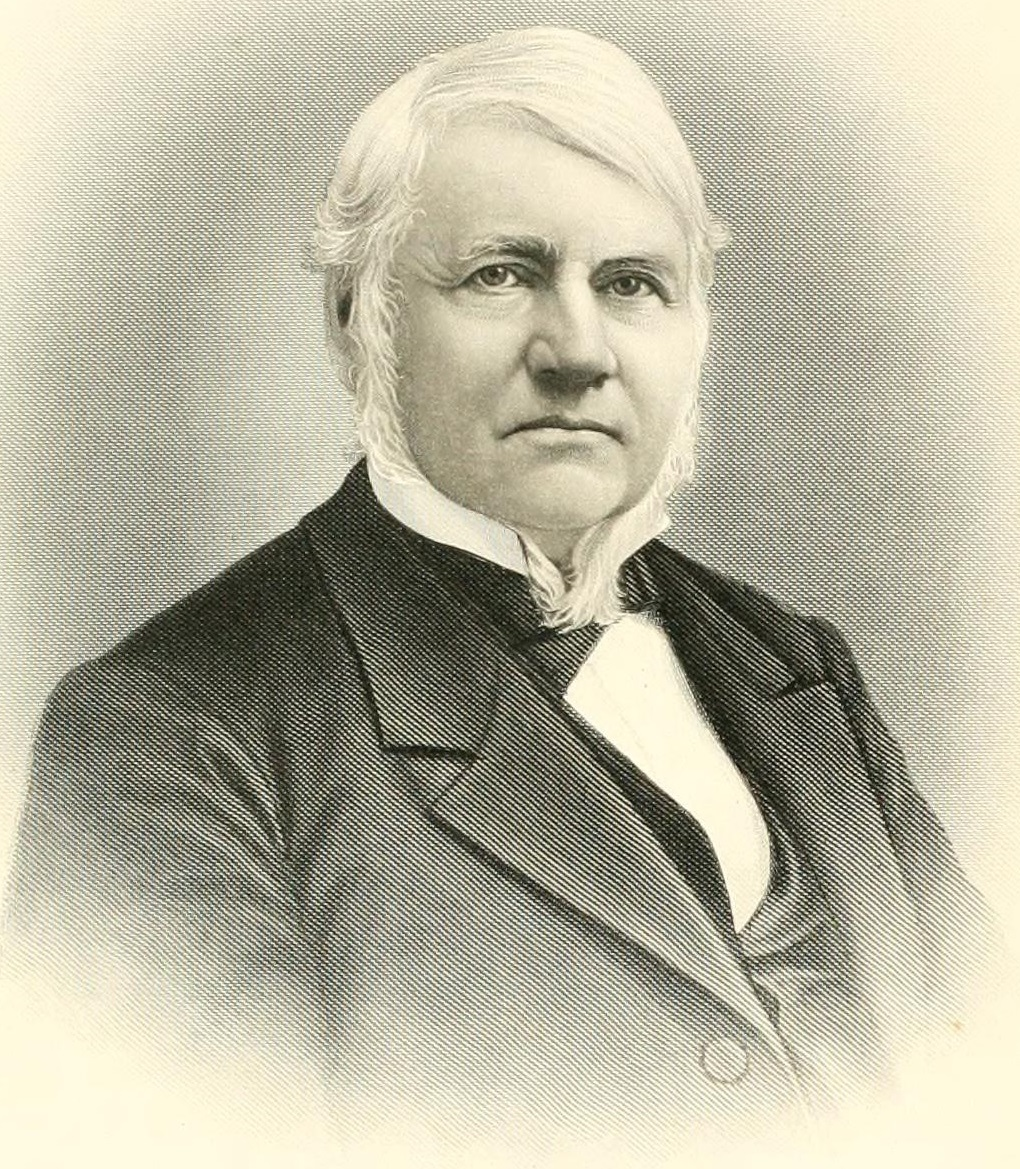
- From 1886's History of Rutland County, Vermont

Associate Justice of the Vermont Supreme Court
- In office 1867–1869
- Preceded by: Loyal C. Kellogg
- Succeeded by: Hoyt H. Wheeler

Member of the Vermont Senate from Rutland County
- In office October 10. 1867 – November 8, 1867 Serving with Ira C. Allen, Capen Leonard
- Preceded by: Pitt W. Hyde, John Howe Jr., Seneca M. Dorr
- Succeeded by: Ira C. Allen, Capen Leonard, Merritt Clark

Member of the Vermont House of Representatives from Rutland Town
- In office 1865–1867
- Preceded by: Seneca M. Dorr
- Succeeded by: Redfield Proctor

State's Attorney of Addison County, Vermont
- In office 1848–1851
- Preceded by: George W. Grandey
- Succeeded by: John Wolcott Stewart

Member of the Vermont House of Representatives from Salisbury
- In office 1847–1849
- Preceded by: Samuel S. Crook
- Succeeded by: John Colby

Personal details
- Born: November 21, 1815 Salisbury, Vermont
- Died: August 28, 1890 (aged 74) Rutland, Vermont
- Resting place: Evergreen Cemetery, Rutland, Vermont
- Party: Whig Party (before 1856); Republican (from 1856)
- Spouse(s): Louisa M. Cook (m. 1840–1848, her death); Sarah P. Smith (m. 1849–1877, her death); Ellen Sophia Ellsworth (1878–1890, his death)
- Children: 3
- Profession: Attorney

John Prout (November 21, 1815 – August 28, 1890) was a Vermont attorney, politician, and judge who served as an associate justice of the Vermont Supreme Court from 1867 to 1869.

== Biography ==
John Prout was born in Salisbury, Vermont on November 21, 1815, the son of John C. Prout (1795–1877) and Phebe (or Phoebe) Holman (1793–1836). He was educated in Salisbury, and then apprenticed as a printer. After working in the printing business for several years, Prout studied law with Ebenezer N. Briggs. He attained admission to the bar in 1837, and began to practice in partnership with Briggs. originally a member of the Whig Party, Prout represented Salisbury in the Vermont House of Representatives in 1847 and 1848. From 1848 to 1851 Prout served as State's Attorney of Addison County.

In 1854, Prout moved to the village of Rutland in Rutland Town, where he continued to practice law. He had different partners at different times, and among them were Walter C. Dunton, Charles Linsley and Aldace F. Walker. By now a Republican, he represented Rutland in the Vermont House in 1865 and 1866, and Rutland County in the Vermont Senate in 1867. In 1867, Prout succeeded Loyal C. Kellogg as an associate justice of the Vermont Supreme Court, and he served until 1869, when he was replaced by Hoyt H. Wheeler.

After leaving the court, Prout continued to practice law until he retired in 1886.

== Death and burial ==
Prout died in Rutland on August 28, 1890. He was buried at Evergreen Cemetery in Rutland.

== Family ==
In 1840, Prout married Louisa M. Cook (1823–1848). After his second wife's death, in 1849 Prout married Sarah P. Smith, who died in 1877. His third wife, whom he married in 1878, was Ellen Sophia Ellsworth (1824–1897), the widow of George Washington Strong (1818–1858), and a descendant of Oliver Ellsworth.

Prout was the father of three children. With his first wife, he had a son Edward J. (1847–1888), and a daughter Cornelia Seward (called Emelia) (1847–1920). With his second wife, he had a daughter, Mary S. (1859–1934). In 1883, Cornelia Prout married Samuel Howard Field (1842–1892). In 1890, Mary married Charles H. West, who worked in the banking industry in Rutland, and later served as Rutland's postmaster.

== Sources ==
=== Books ===
- Harman, Henry A. (October 25, 1892). A Memorial Sketch of John Prout: Published in the Annual Meeting Proceedings of the Vermont Bar Association. Montpelier, VT: Argus and Patriot Book and Job Printing.
- Prout, Dale Ellison (2002). Ancestry and Descendants of Captain Timothy Prout of Boston. Baltimore, MD: Gateway Press.

=== Newspapers ===
- "The Election: Representatives; Addison County". Middlebury Galaxy. Middlebury, VT. September 12, 1848.
- "The Supreme Court of Vt.: Declination of Judge Kellogg, Election of His Successor". Burlington Free Press. Burlington, VT. November 15, 1867.
- "Montpelier Correspondence". Burlington Free Press. Burlington, VT. November 11, 1869. p. 3.
- "Vermont News, Wedding of Mary Prout and Charles H. West". St. Johnsbury Caledonian. St. Johnsbury, VT. December 4, 1890.
- "Charles H. West, 73, Rutland Postmaster for 12 Years, Dies". Burlington Free Press. Burlington, VT. April 12, 1934.

=== Internet ===
- Rutland (Vermont) Town (August 25, 1888). "Death Record for John "Jack" Prout in Vermont, Vital Records, 1720-1908". Ancestry.com. Provo, UT: Ancestry.com, LLC.

Political offices
Preceded by Loyal C. Kellogg	Justice of the Vermont Supreme Court; 1867–1869	Succeeded by Hoyt H. Wheeler
