= Samuel E. Pingree =

American politician (1832–1922)

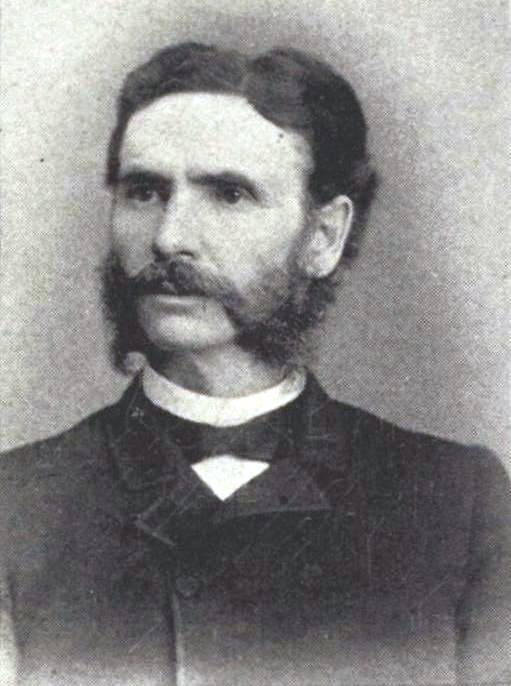
- Samuel E. Pingree as depicted in Deeds of Valor

40th Governor of Vermont
- In office October 2, 1884 – October 7, 1886
- Lieutenant: Ebenezer J. Ormsbee
- Preceded by: John L. Barstow
- Succeeded by: Ebenezer J. Ormsbee

34th Lieutenant Governor of Vermont
- In office October 5, 1882 – October 2, 1884
- Governor: John L. Barstow
- Preceded by: John L. Barstow
- Succeeded by: Ebenezer J. Ormsbee

Chairman of the Vermont Railroad Commission
- In office 1886–1894
- Preceded by: None (position created)
- Succeeded by: Olin Merrill

State's Attorney of Windsor County, Vermont
- In office 1867–1869
- Preceded by: John F. Deane
- Succeeded by: James N. Edminster

Town Clerk of Hartford, Vermont
- In office 1865–1922
- Preceded by: George Tenney
- Succeeded by: William S. Pingree
- In office 1861–1861
- Preceded by: Justin C. Brooks
- Succeeded by: Justin C. Brooks

Personal details
- Born: August 2, 1832 Salisbury, New Hampshire, U.S.
- Died: June 1, 1922 (aged 89) Hartford, Vermont, U.S.
- Resting place: Hartford Cemetery, Hartford, Vermont U.S.
- Party: Republican
- Spouse: Lydia M. Steele (m. 1869)
- Education: Dartmouth College
- Profession: Lawyer; Politician
- Awards: Medal of Honor

Military service
- Allegiance: United States of America; Union
- Branch/service: Union Army
- Years of service: 1861–1864
- Rank: Lieutenant Colonel
- Unit: 1st Vermont Brigade
- Commands: Company F, 3rd Vermont Infantry; 2nd Vermont Infantry
- Battles/wars: American Civil War

Samuel Everett Pingree (August 2, 1832 – June 1, 1922) was an American lawyer and politician from Vermont. A Republican, he served as lieutenant governor from 1882 to 1884 and governor from 1884 to 1886. Pingree was a Union Army veteran of the American Civil War and received the Medal of Honor for heroism at the 1862 Battle at Lee's Mills.

A native of Salisbury, New Hampshire, Pingree graduated from Dartmouth College in 1857, studied law, and attained admission to the bar in 1859. He then began to practice in Hartford, Vermont in partnership with his brother Stephen. In 1861, he served as Hartford's town clerk.

During the American Civil War, Pingree joined the 3rd Vermont Infantry, and after receiving his commission, he advanced to captain as commander of the regiment's Company F. In 1864, he was a lieutenant colonel when he was assigned to command the 2nd Vermont Infantry, which he led until receiving his discharge in July 1864. Pingree took part in numerous battles, and in 1891 received the Medal of Honor for heroism at Lee's Mills while commanding Company F in 1862.

After his military service, Pingree practiced law in Hartford and became active in politics as a Republican. He was Hartford's town clerk from 1865 to 1922, and State's Attorney of Windsor County from 1867 to 1869. In 1882 he was the successful Republican nominee for lieutenant governor, and he served for two years. In 1884, he was the Republican nominee for governor. He won the general election and served one two-year term, in keeping with the provisions of the party's "Mountain Rule".

After his term as governor, Pingree continued to practice law in Hartford. When the Vermont Railroad Commission was created in 1886, he was appointed its first chairman, and he served until 1894. He died in Hartford on June 1, 1922 and was buried at Hartford Cemetery in Hartford.

== Early life ==
Samuel E. Pingree was born in Salisbury, New Hampshire on August 2, 1832, the son of Stephen and Judith (True) Pingrey. (Note: The Pingree family's name is spelled variously as Pingrey, Pingry, and Pingree. Samuel Pingree and his brother Stephen changed the spelling of their name from Pingrey to Pingree.) He received his early education in Andover, New Hampshire, and McIndoes Falls, Vermont, then entered Dartmouth College, where he graduated in 1857. He studied law with his cousin Augustus P. Hunton in Bethel, Vermont, and was admitted to the bar of Windsor County in December 1859. He then began practicing law in Hartford in partnership with his brother Stephen (1835–1892).

== Civil War ==
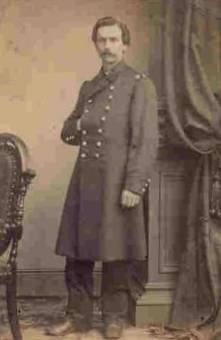
Capt. Samuel E. Pingree

Pingree enlisted in Company F, 3rd Vermont Infantry in 1861, and was soon chosen first lieutenant. In August 1861, he was promoted to captain, and was commissioned major on September 27, 1862, and lieutenant colonel on January 15, 1863. He was severely wounded at the Battle at Lee's Mills on April 16, 1862, during which he led his company and three others across a wide creek and drove the enemy from rifle pits on the opposite bank. In addition to losing his right thumb, Pingree contracted typhoid; reports of his death appeared in Vermont newspapers, but were quickly corrected. He spent ten weeks recuperating in a Philadelphia hospital.

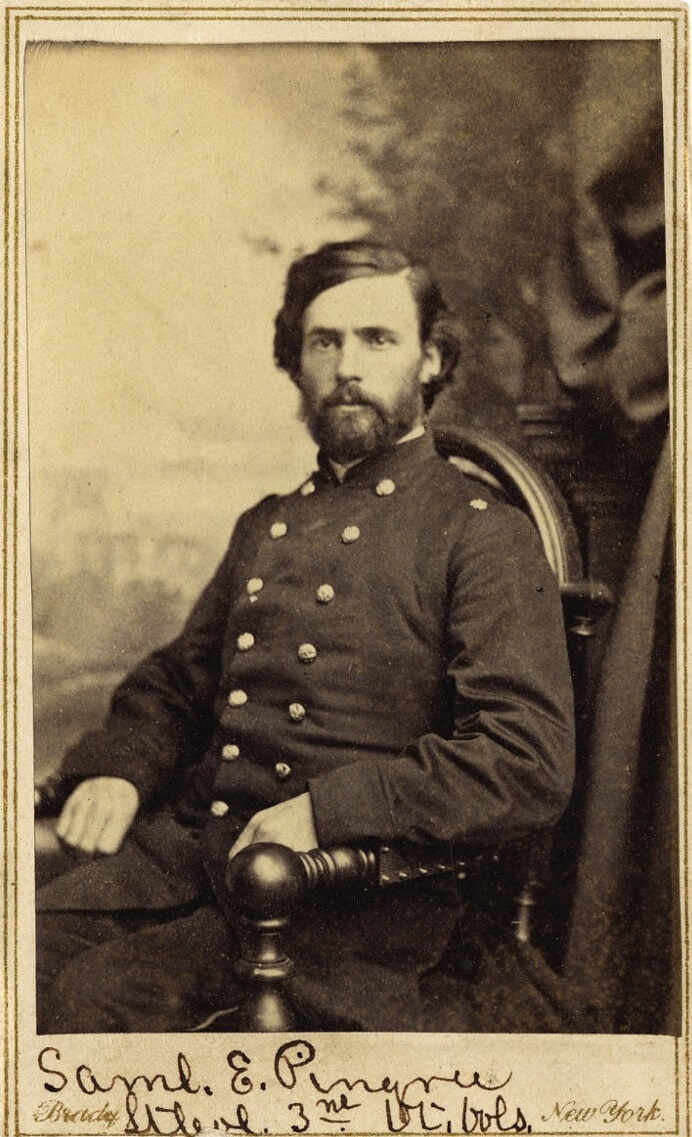
Pingree as a lieutenant colonel in 1863

During the second day of the Battle of the Wilderness, Pingree was placed in command of the 2nd Vermont Infantry, since all the field officers of that unit had been killed or wounded. Pingree participated in the battles of Spotsylvania, North Anna, Cold Harbor, Petersburg, and Weldon Railroad, where he narrowly escaped capture with a portion of his command. Pingree's final military action occurred at Fort Stevens on July 11 and 12, 1864. He mustered out of the service on July 27, 1864, having remained in uniform two months past the end of his enlistment obligation. On August 17, 1891, Pingree received the Medal of Honor for his 1862 actions at Lee's Mills.

While Samuel Pingree served with the 2nd and 3rd Vermont, his brother Stephen Morse Pingree (1835-1892) was a member of the 4th Vermont Infantry; originally a first lieutenant in Company E, he eventually attained the rank of colonel as the regiment's commander.

After leaving the Army, Samuel and Stephen Pingree led the 8th Infantry Regiment of the Vermont Militia; Samuel commanded as a colonel, and Stephen was second-in-command as a lieutenant colonel.

== Postwar life ==
Pingree returned to Hartford and his law practice, and received his Master of Arts degree from Dartmouth in 1867. While in college, Pingree became a member of Phi Beta Kappa and Delta Kappa Epsilon. In 1868 and 1869, he was state's attorney for Windsor County. He served as town clerk of Hartford for over 50 years, and was chosen delegate-at-large to the 1868 Republican National Convention in Chicago. In 1870 he was elected president of the Reunion Society of Vermont Officers. Pingree was an active member of the Windsor County Republican Committee and attended numerous local and state party conventions as a delegate.

In the fall of 1882, Pingree was elected lieutenant governor, and in 1884, governor. "His administration was characterized by the same efficiency and zeal which he has ever displayed as soldier, lawyer and citizen." During his gubernatorial term, Vermont took steps to conduct oversight and examination of the state's banks and expanded regulation of insurance companies by requiring them to submit annual reports and financial statements. In addition, he worked to increase the length of the school year and expand the number of local schools. On May 1, 1885 he inaugurated Arbor Day in Vermont, making the state the first east of the Mississippi to celebrate the day. During his term Pingree also advocated laws prohibiting the adulteration of maple syrup and honey, which unscrupulous operators had begun to dilute with beet sugar and other less expensive fillers.

After his governorship, Pingree served as chairman of the newly established state railway commission from 1886 to 1894. He was a trustee of Vermont Academy in Saxtons River from 1885 to 1910. He was active in the Grand Army of the Republic and also served as judge advocate of the Medal of Honor Legion, an organization established in 1890 to protect the reputation of the award. He was also a trustee of the State Normal School in Randolph for many years, and also served as president of the White River Savings Bank.

In 1886 he was awarded the honorary degree of LL.D. from Norwich University. Pingree died in Hartford on June 1, 1922. He was buried at Hartford Cemetery in Hartford.

== Family ==
On September 15, 1869, Pingree married Lydia M. Steele, daughter of Sanford and Mary (Hinman) Steele, of Stanstead, Quebec. Lydia Steele was the sister of Benjamin H. Steele, who was a college classmate of Pingree's, and served as an Associate Justice of the Vermont Supreme Court.

Lydia Steele and Samuel Pingree were the parents of an adopted son, William Steele Pingree (1879-1965). William S. Pingree attended Norwich University for three years, and Boston University School of Law for one. He completed his legal studies with his father, and after being admitted to the bar in 1904, the younger Pingree practiced law in Hartford, served as town clerk (1923-1942), and also served as Windsor County State's Attorney.

== Medal of Honor citation ==

Rank and Organization:

Captain, Company F, 3d Vermont Infantry Place and date: Lees Mills, Va., April 16, 1862. Entered service at. Hartford, Vt. Birth: Salisbury, N.H. Date of issue: August 17, 1891.

Citation:

Gallantly led his company across a wide, deep creek, drove the enemy from the rifle pits, which were within 2 yards of the farther bank, and remained at the head of his men until a second time severely wounded.

== See also ==
- List of Medal of Honor recipients
- List of American Civil War Medal of Honor recipients: M–P
- Vermont in the Civil War

== Sources ==
- Benedict, G. G., Vermont in the Civil War, Burlington, VT: The Free Press Association, 1888, pp. i:114–116, 138–144, 148–149, 254–259, 376, 443, 462, 476, 491; ii:357–361, 364.
- Carleton, Hiram, Genealogical and Family History of the State of Vermont, New York: The Lewis Publishing Company, 1903, pp. i:16–18.
- Dodge, Prentiss C., Encyclopedia Vermont Biography, Burlington, VT: Ullery Publishing Company, 1912, p. 47.
- Peck, Theodore S., compiler, Revised Roster of Vermont Volunteers and Lists of Vermonters Who Served in the Army and Navy of the United States During the War of the Rebellion, 1861–66. Montpelier, VT.: Press of the Watchman Publishing Co., 1892, pp. 67, 70, 89, 741.

Party political offices
Preceded by John L. Barstow	Republican nominee for Lieutenant Governor of Vermont; 1882	Succeeded by Ebenezer J. Ormsbee
Preceded by John L. Barstow	Republican nominee for Governor of Vermont; 1884	Succeeded by Ebenezer J. Ormsbee
Political offices
Preceded by John L. Barstow	Lieutenant Governor of Vermont; 1882–1884	Succeeded by Ebenezer J. Ormsbee
Preceded by John L. Barstow	Governor of Vermont; 1884-1886	Succeeded by Ebenezer J. Ormsbee
